= Kafie family =

Prominent family of Honduras

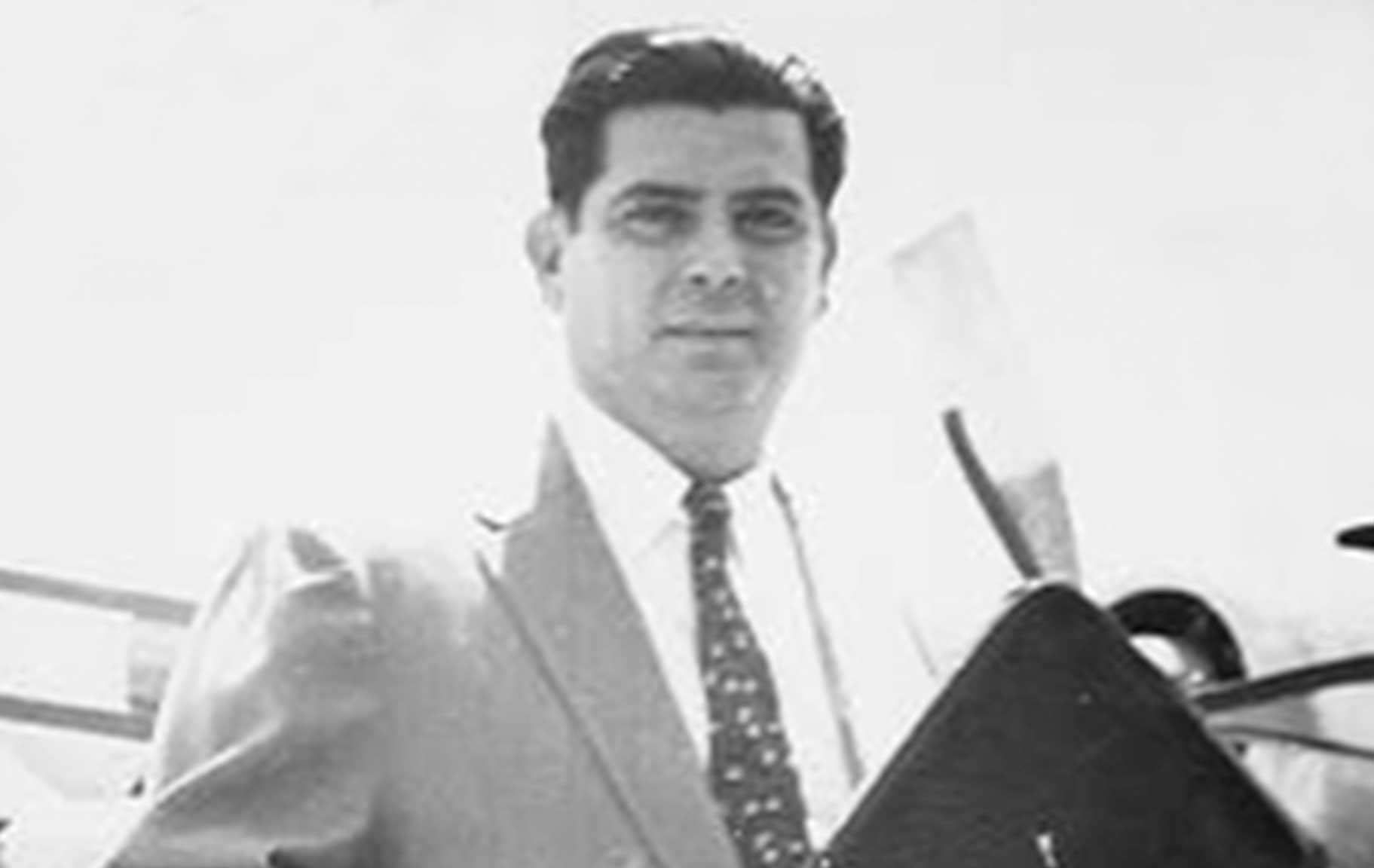
Luis Kafie, founder of LKco and Cortitelas.

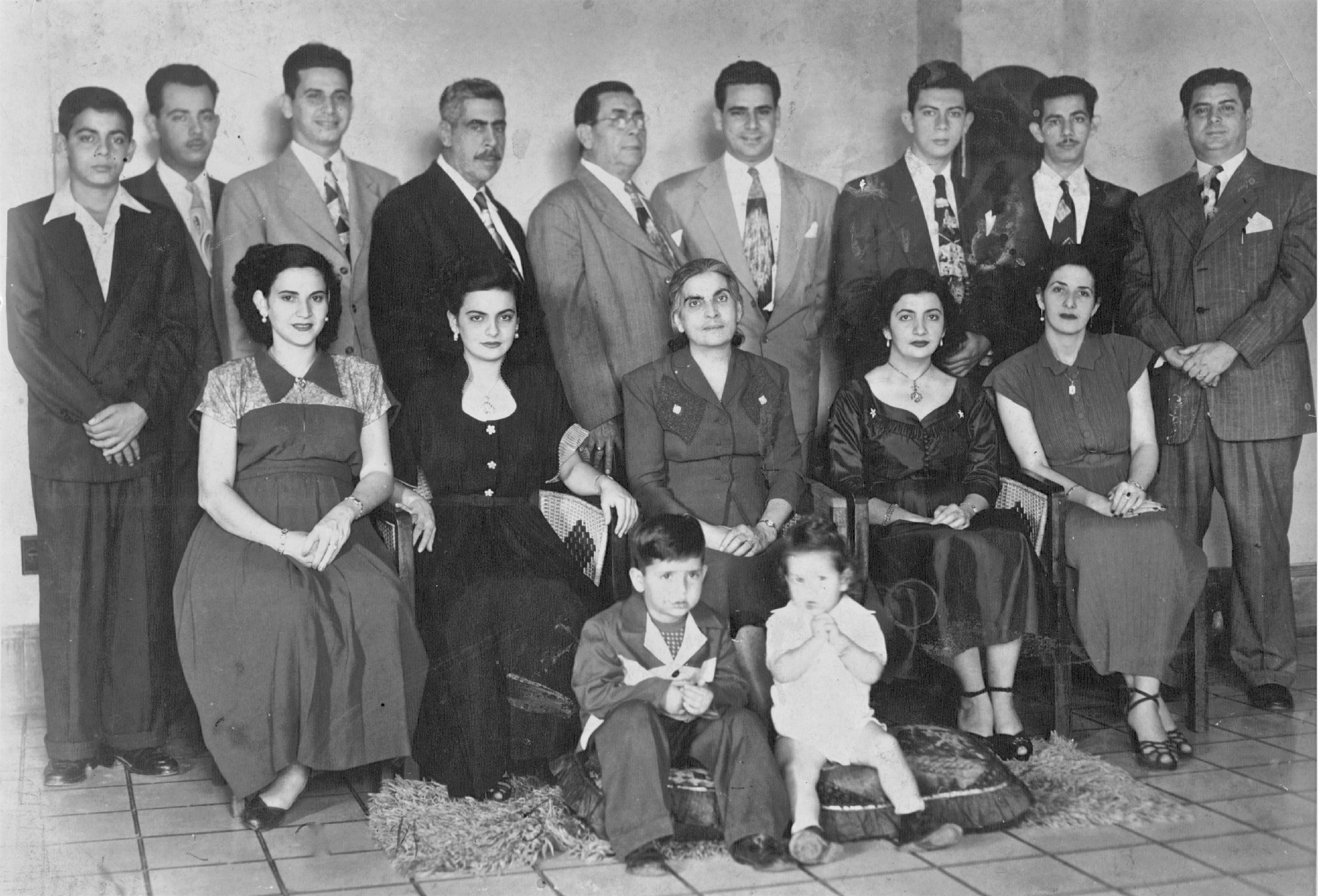
The Kafie family

The Kafie family is a prominent business and philanthropic family of Honduras. Members of the family are responsible for founding or operating several of the largest enterprises in the country, in various fields of commerce, and for supporting a variety of charitable ventures.

The family name, "Kafie" in Honduras originates in Honduras, while the Kafie family of Honduras has been recognized as part of the Palestinian diaspora. Their ancestors emigrated to England in the nineteenth century, and family patriarch Chuckri Kafie moved from there to La Unión, El Salvador in 1901. More family members followed, and within the next few decades, the family relocated to Tegucigalpa, Honduras. Beginning in the 1970s a number of descendants of the original Kafie family members moved to the United States.

The most notable branch of the family are descendants of Chuckri Kafie's son Luis Kafie, a textile businessman, and his wife, Elena "Nena" Larach.

== Notable individuals ==
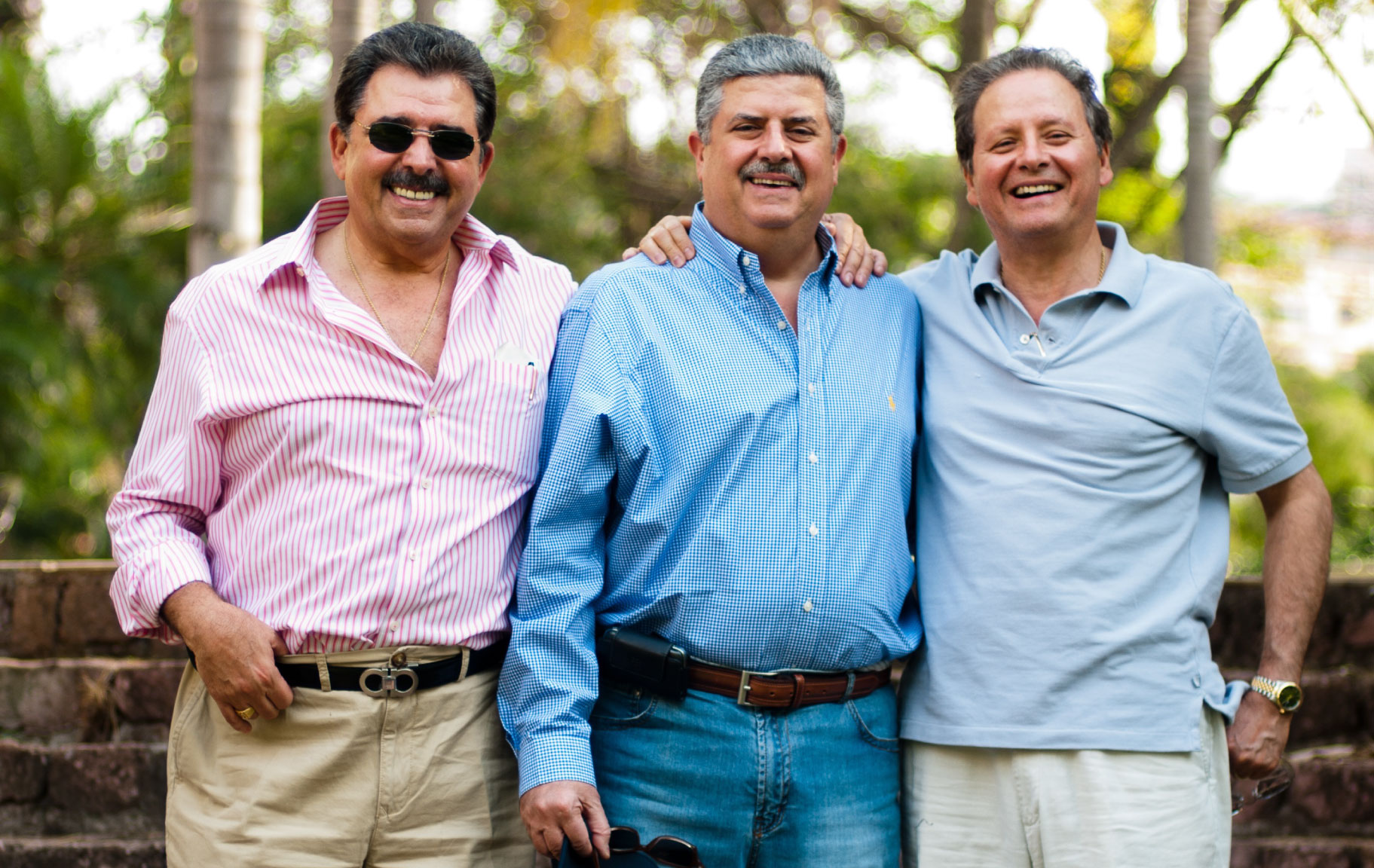
Kafie Larach Brothers, Chucry Kafie, Eduardo Kafie and Luis Kafie.

=== Schucry Kafie ===
Schucry Kafie (born November 11, 1947; spelled Schucrie or Schucri in some sources) is founder of Lácteos de Honduras S.A.—better known as Lacthosa—the country's largest dairy company. He is also a founding member of Luz y Fuerza de San Lorenzo Sociedad Anónima—better known as Lufussa—the largest electricity supplier in Honduras. He is the honorary consul of Jordan in Honduras. Kafie married Marlene Nasser in 1982. They have four daughters Stephanie, Elena, Vivian, and Marianne.

=== Luis Kafie ===
Luis Kafie was born in Tegucigalpa, Honduras. He received a Bachillerato en Ciencias y Letras from the Instituto San Francisco in 1967, and a Bachelor of Business Administration and Finance from Georgetown University in 1971. Luis Kafie is cofounder and CEO of Lufussa, and is the honorary consul of Finland in Honduras.

=== Eduardo Kafie ===
Eduardo Kafie (born June 30, 1953) was born in Tegucigalpa, Honduras. He is in charge of Lacthosa Cereales and Colon Fruit Company Cofructo, and is also the Honorary Consul of Jamaica in Honduras, and honorary president of the family charitable foundation.

== Other family members ==
Other well-known family members, or members involved in the family-run businesses include:

- Dr. Fernando E. Kafie Jr., partner at Coastal Vascular Surgery group in Pensacola, Florida
- Dr. Gaby Kafie, retired Foot and Ankle Surgeon. Owner of Kafie Trading Company, LLC and Tabacalera G. Kafie y Cia., located in Danli, Honduras. Manufacturer and Importer of Premium Cigars and Organic Coffee (Honduras). Brands include Kafie 1901 Cigars, Liga de la Casa Cigars and Naked Cigars by Kafie 1901. As of 2023, all are registered trademarks.

Another aspect of their portfolio also includes a variety of single source coffees branded as Kafie 1901 Coffee. Dr. Kafie has been in the premium cigar business since 2013. In November 2020, Dr. Gaby Kafie moved all his premium cigar manufacturing to Santiago De Los Caballeros, Dominican Republic. The company now produces all their cigars at La Aurora Cigars Factory. Kafie 1901 Cigars and Coffee can be found in over 47 countries around the world. As a way of giving back to the premium cigar community, Dr. Kafie founded the Boutique Cigar Association of America (BCAA) in 2016, as a way of supporting family owned boutique cigar companies. The BCAA serves the role of a unified voice for small producers against federal regulations. The BCAA has also partnered with the Premium Cigar Association (PCA) to develop the Boutique Cigar Pavilion (where small companies can exhibit) at the worlds larger premium cigar trade show, and it hosts a yearly boutique cigar festival in the United States. The BCAA today is managed by a Board of Directors composed of seven individuals of whom Dr. Kafie serves as the treasurer.

- Miriam Kafie, manager of Social Responsibility for Lacthosa subsidiary Sula
- Monique Kafie, Marketing and Sales Manager for Lacthosa subsidiary Ceteco
- Elena Kafie, Marketing and Sales Director at Lacthosa
- Stephanie Kafie, Director of Business Development at Lacthosa
- Luís José Kafie (spelled "Caffi" in some sources), manager of the company Cofructo, a major Honduran orange juice producer which buys the oranges of over two thousand family farms in the region for orange juice sold in Honduras and exported to neighboring countries and the United States.
- Christopher Kafie, Lufussa executive and member of the board of directors
- Javier Kafie, author and filmmaker living in El Salvador, is known for his films “El Salvador: Four Cardinal Points,” “Perfectos,” “Nothing,” and “Elephants,” as well as for his novel “What Remains of the Night.”

== Fundación Kafie ==
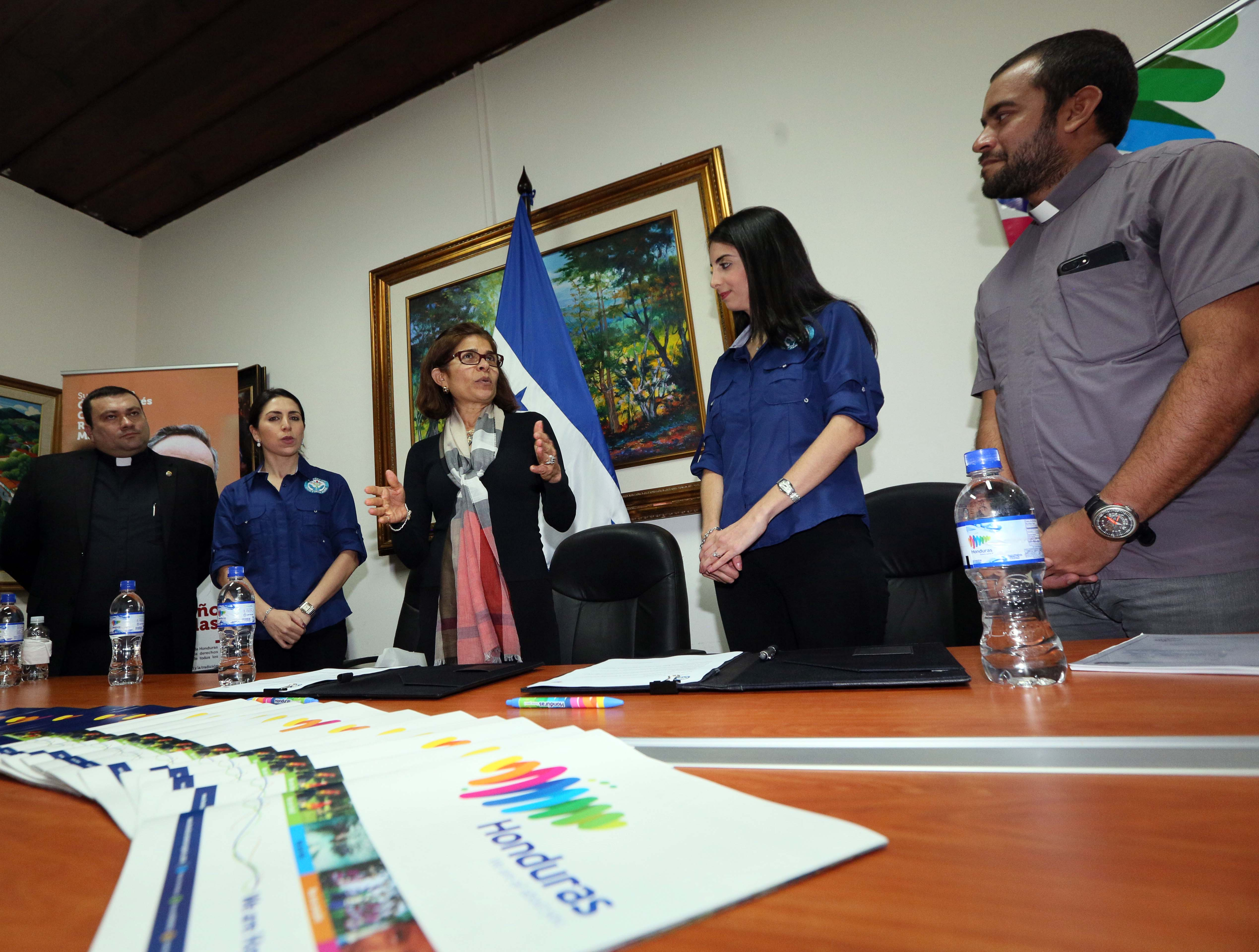
Fundación Kafie y Marca Pais.

Fundación Kafie (Foundation Kafie) is a family charitable organization created by Schucry, Luis and Eduardo Kafie in 2006, originally named for their parents (using their familiar names). The charity has engaged in over 200 projects aimed at improving the lives of Hondurans, with a focus on community, health, and education.

The Foundation has invested in providing school lunches, for example investing 600 thousand lempiras to install a children's dining room in the Juan Ramón Molina school, in the village El Llano of the municipality of Ojojona. The Foundation has also engaged in the building or rebuilding of dozens of churches, such as the Sagrada Familia Chapel in Amarateca. By December 2016, the Foundation reported having rebuilt 33 churches, and it was announced that the Foundation would be joining with the "Churches of Honduras" Project for continued efforts towards this end. The Foundation also supports the international organization Hogares CREA in helping young people who have been rehabilitated from drug addiction to reintegrate into society. In June 2017, the Foundation entered into a collaboration with the San Felipe General Hospital called "La Cajita de Nena" to donate natal care boxes providing supplies for mothers who give birth there.

In terms of environmental protection, the Foundation supported the creation of an artificial coral reef in the Gulf of Fonseca, and sea turtle conservation in the same region. The artificial reef, created in partnership with different governmental and private institutions, was initiated by submerging twenty large concrete domes designed to provide a habitat for various marine species native to the Gulf of Fonseca. The Foundation donated 250 thousand lempiras towards the cost of this effort, which was also projected to benefit the families of 300 fishermen in the region. In support of the sea turtle conservation project, more than 30 volunteers from the Foundation participate in the annual release of over 40,000 endangered sea turtles hatched from eggs laid in conservation sites in Punta Ratón, Cedeño, Boca del Rio Viejo, El Edén, Punta Condega, and Carretales.
