= Renewable energy in Honduras =

In Honduras, there is an important potential of untapped indigenous renewable energy resources. Due to the variability of high oil prices and declining renewable infrastructure costs, such resources could be developed at competitive prices.

Currently hydropower, solar and biomass are used on a large scale for electricity generation. While the potential of large generation from hydropower and geothermal energy has been studied in detail, the potential for the development of other renewable energy resources is yet to be explored in depth.

== Legal and policy framework ==
Decrees No. 85-98 and 267-98 promote the development of renewable energy-generating plants. The decrees include tax breaks to developers and a secure buyer for energy at prices equivalent to the system’s short-term marginal cost. The national integrated utility ENEE, which is the default buyer, must pay a premium (10 percent of the same short-run marginal cost) for the electricity generated when the installed capacity is below 50 MW. This framework has facilitated the negotiation of about 30 public/private partnerships with ENEE for small renewable energy plants. In addition, Decree No. 85-98 also establishes tax exemptions in favor of developers: import and salestaxes on equipment, and a five-year income tax holiday.

The penetration of renewable energy technologies into rural electrification programs is still lagging behind due to a lack of clear and consistent policy framework in the field. As a result, most of the rural electrification activities are still grid extensions.

== Energy sources ==
In 2022, Honduras' energy mix was dominated by oil, constituting 54.9% of the total energy supply, followed by biofuels and waste at 32.2%. Modern renewables like hydro, solar, and wind, excluding traditional biomass practices like burning wood or agricultural residues, accounted for 12.9%.

=== Hydro ===
In 2024, the country had 849 MW of installed capacity in hydro power. There has been an intensive use of small- and medium-scale hydro energy, with 14 out of 16 existing hydro plants with capacity below 30 MW. Two large plants (El Cajón Dam (Honduras) and Rio Lindo) account, however, for more than 70% of the total capacity.

In Honduras, there is a large potential for electricity generation based on hydropower. In 2003 then President Ricardo Maduro put in place a Special Commission for the Development of Hydroelectric Projects.

There are 16 new hydro projects that are expected to be commissioned before 2011, with an overall capacity of 206.5 MW. The two largest projects are the Cangrejal and Patuca 3. There are also other large hydropower project that are not included in the power expansion plan. These large projects have attracted some criticism. Some of the most prominent projects are:

- Cangrejal: This planned dam on the Rio Cangrejal near La Ceiba, with an associated 40 MW power plant, has attracted international criticism due to its potential environmental impact, including the flooding of rapids that are a well-known whitewater sports destination and attract many tourists
- Patuca 3: The Patuca 3 dam on the Patuca River in the Department of Olancho, with an associated 100 MW power plant, is to be built in a protected area that is part of the Mesoamerican Biological Corridor and is inhabited by indigenous people whose livelihoods would be affected.
- Los Llanitos: The Los Llanitos Hydroelectric Power Project is planned on the Ulua River. The plant was initially expected to have a capacity between 94 and 135 MW, but has later been reduced to 50 MW. Initial plans had been drawn up as part of the Sula Valley Water Management Plan, but the project had not been implemented.
- The Jicatuyo dam (170 MW) on the river of the same name, a tributary of the Ulua River.

Concerning medium-size and small dams, private developers receive tax breaks. Specifically, private producers are benefiting from fiscal incentives, tax exemptions, and the recognition of 10 percent of the short-term marginal cost per kWh as a premium. Fiscal incentives for small and medium-size hydropower have created a bias toward this type of development and against other renewable options, such as the use of photovoltaic, wind, and geothermal systems.

In 2015, the 38.5 MW La Vegona hydropower plant came online as well as 10.8 MW of smaller projects.

In 2021, renewable electricity generation from non-combustible sources was led by hydro, representing 62.5% of the total. Solar photovoltaic (PV) energy followed at 18.9%, with wind power at 12.9%, and geothermal energy at 5.8%.

=== Wind ===
Due to the diversity of the Honduran landscape, the potential for wind development varies considerably. A 100 MW wind project was built in 2012. Finance was agreed with US EXIM Bank in mid 2010 (EXIM bank project reference AP083987xx). This project, sponsored by Mesoamerica Energy, is located in Cerro de Hula, in the municipalities of Santa Ana and San Buenaventura, 20 km south of Tegucigalpa. Mesoamerica seems to be actively controlled by the Actis Infrastructure Fund. A 24 MW expansion of this wind farm was completed in 2014. A 50 MW wind plant was built in 2014 in San Marcos de Colón.

=== Solar ===
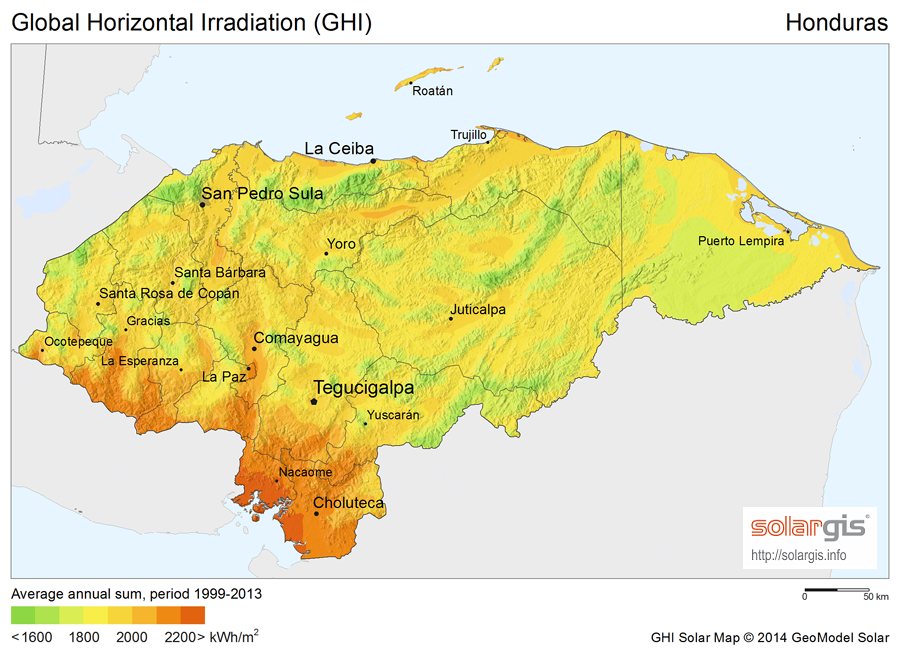
Solar power potential of Honduras

According to an IEA-PVPS estimate Honduras generated just over 12% of its total electricity demand from solar power during 2015. This means that in just one year the country has leapfrogged previous rankings to become first in the world for PV power penetration at that time. In 2015, Honduras ranked as the second largest producer of solar electricity in Latin America (behind Chile, but ahead of Mexico). Honduras has a large potential for solar photovoltaic generation. In fact, it is a practical solution for servicing energy-isolated rural communities. In 2007, there were about 5,000 individual Solar Home Systems, with an average size between 30 Wp and 50 Wp, which makes up for a total capacity of approximately 15 to 25 kW of power. The government utility, Empresa Nacional de Energía Eléctrica (ENEE), offered 20-year guaranteed contracts for utility scale solar farms. This resulted in 23 solar farms being approved in 2014 for a total of 609MW and will represent an investment of 1.6 billion US dollars. The ten parks totaling 300MW which came online by July 31, 2015 got a bonus.

Examples of solar farms:

- 144 MW solar park in Nacaome
- 61.5 MW Aura II PV Solar Plant
- 35.1 MW Choluteca II
- 23.3 MW Pacífico
- 23.3 MW Choluteca I

An additional 250 MW of solar power are expected to come online in 2015 including another 50 MW project in Nacaome.

=== Biomass ===
Honduras has a large potential for electricity generation from biomass, mainly from the sugar industry. Currently, there are nine biomass projects in operation, with a total of 81.75 MW installed capacity. These plants are estimated to supply 2.3 percent of the total demand of energy in Honduras for 2007.

=== Geothermal ===
The three planned geothermal projects in Honduras add up to 85.5 MW of installed capacity. The largest of them is called Platanares, in the Department of Copan, which began operations in 2011 with an installed capacity of 40.5 MW and a generation of 354.8 GWh per year.

== See also ==
- Electricity sector in Honduras

== Sources ==
- World Bank: Honduras. Power Sector Issues and Options, 2007.
- ENEE on Renewable Energy Prospects
