= Empresa Nacional de Energía Eléctrica =

- Genre: Electric utility
- Founded: February 20, 1957
- Headquarters: Tegucigalpa, Honduras
- Number of employees: 500

The Empresa Nacional de Energía Eléctrica (also commonly known as ENEE) is Honduras's government owned and operated electrical power company, operating within the Electricity sector in Honduras.

== By the numbers ==
- ENEE employs more than 500 people.
- ENEE serves 1.3 million households and more than one hundred thousand of commercial and industrial customers.
- ENEE covers 84.8% of Honduras' electricity demand (June 2012).

== History ==
The organization was created on February 20, 1957, as an autonomous organization responsible for the production, transmission, distribution and commercialization of electrical energy in Honduras.

The first large-scale project was the first hydroelectric power station, Cañaveral, which included the construction of transmission lines and substations in order to distribute its generated power to the final consumers. The so-called National Interconnected System continued to expand and now covers most main regions throughout the country. In 1985 the Francisco Morazán Hydroelectric Project (El Cajón Dam) was completed at a cost of US$775 million.

After recently changing over to smart meters, electricity bills have increases three-fold.

== Private energy suppliers ==
- Lufussa
- EMCE
- ENERSA

== See also ==
- Hondutel
