= Miguel Facussé Barjum =

Honduran businessman (1924–2015)

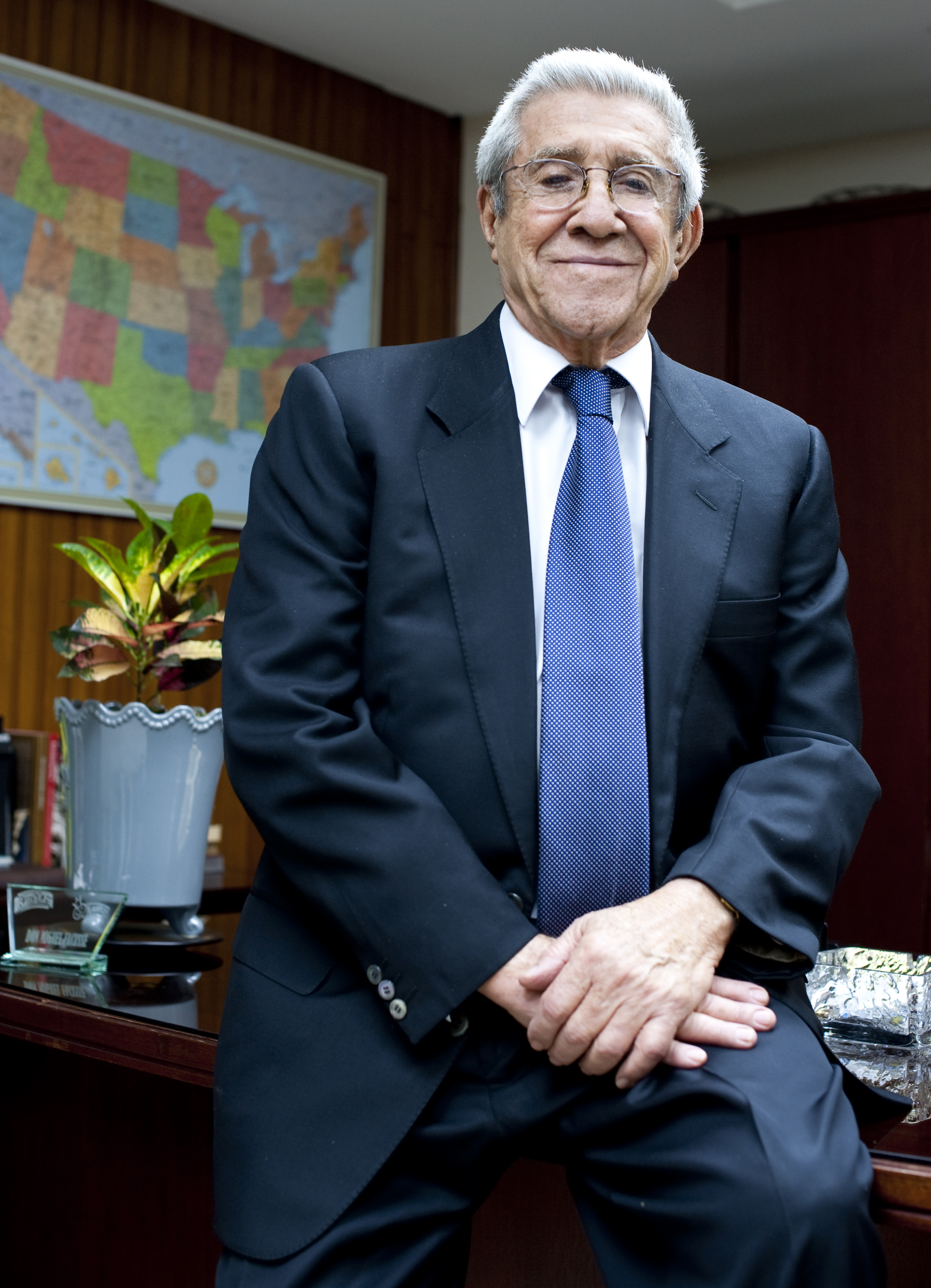
- Miguel Facussé, former Executive President, Corporación Dinant
- Born: August 14, 1924; Tegucigalpa, Honduras
- Died: June 23, 2015 (aged 90)
- Education: University of Notre Dame
- Occupation: President of Corporación Dinant

Miguel Facussé Barjum (August 14, 1924 – June 23, 2015) was a Honduran businessman and landowner. He was Executive President of Corporación Dinant, a consumer products manufacturing company he founded in Honduras in 1960. Dinant sells its products throughout Central America and the Dominican Republic, and also exports to global markets. A 2006 study by the Friedrich Ebert Foundation named Facussé one of the three "most powerful men in Honduras". Facussé was the chief economic advisor to President Roberto Suazo Córdova during his term in office from 1982 to 1986 and vice-president of APROH, a "right-wing grouping of business interests and members of the armed forces" from the early 1980s to at least 2001. Facussé was married and had nine children. His nephew, Carlos Roberto Flores, was President of Honduras from 1998 to 2002. His son-in-law, Fredy Nasser, is a prominent Honduran businessman. In May 2009, Facussé was awarded the Orden Mérito a la Democracia en el Grado de Gran Caballero by the Senate of Colombia. In August 2014, he was awarded the CEAL Founders' Award for his pioneering role in promoting business between Latin American nations.

== Early life and education ==
Miguel Facussé was born in Tegucigalpa, Honduras in 1924, the seventh of nine children of Nicholás and María Barjum de Facussé. He is a second-generation Palestinian, from Bethlehem.

Facussé earned a degree in aeronautical engineering in 1944 at the University of Notre Dame. Facussé hosted Notre Dame University President Rev. Theodore M. Hesburgh, CSC during a visit to Honduras in 1960 and Rev. Edward "Monk" Malloy, CSC in 2003.

== Career ==
=== Costa Rica ===
In 1944, Facussé moved to Costa Rica, where he converted warplanes into commercial cargo airliners. He quickly became general manager of a multinational corporation that reconstructed and maintained wartime aircraft from all over the world.

=== 1960s ===
After returning to Tegucigalpa, Facussé worked in his brother's textile company. Facussé set up Químicas Dinant de Centroamérica SA in July 1960. In the late 1960s, Facussé won contracts with Procter & Gamble to produce and distribute its products in Honduras, El Salvador, and Guatemala.

In 1969, Facussé was president of both the Honduras Industrial Association and the Central American Industrial Association. At the time, Facussé owned Químicas Dinant, a company that made soaps and detergents.

=== 1970s ===
In the 1970s, Facussé created a small factory making detergents and soaps for Químicas Dinant. He did so with support from the private international banking sector and credit from the Corporación Nacional de Inversiones (CONADI), created by the state in 1974 as part of the strategy to consolidate the new Industrial Model for Substituting Imports (ISI).

=== 1980s ===
In the early 1980s, Facussé was the chief economic advisor to President Roberto Suazo Córdova (in office 1982 to 1986). During this time Facussé helped his nephew, Carlos Roberto Flores, (who later went on to become president of Honduras) become a political advisor to Suazo.

In the 1980s, Facussé was also vice-president of the Asociación para el Progreso de Honduras (APROH), an organization officially founded in January 1983 linking business leaders and military personnel (head of the armed forces Gustavo Álvarez Martínez was elected its first president). A "widely publicised memorandum" by Facussé "argued that the only way out of the national crisis was to 'sell Honduras to the foreign investor'". Facussé was still listed as Vice-President of APROH in 2001.

=== 1990s ===
Facussé was president of the Cressida Corporation, which in the 1990s received a $55m investment loan from the World Bank. In 2000 Facussé sold Cressida, which had subsidiaries throughout Central America and was at the time described as "the biggest food and cleaning products manufacturer in Honduras" to Unilever for $322m for an estimated net profit to Facussé of $120m. Facussé had previously sold the brand Magia Blanca and others to Procter & Gamble for over $25m.

=== 2000s ===
In 2011, Facussé remained the owner of Corporación Dinant, which owned over 22,000 acres of palm plantations in Bajo Aguán. Facussé was described in 2012 by Reporters without Borders as having, "a private militia that can count on support from the police and army to impose his will". Reporters without Borders previously had called upon Facussé to respond publicly after the president of La Voz de Zacate Grande, a radio station involved in a land struggle against Facussé, was shot in 2011. Accusations that Facussé's militia had killed agricultural workers who had occupied his land led to the withdrawal in 2011 of a $20m investment loan from the German, and to Électricité de France cancelling the purchase of carbon credits from Dinant.

However the United Nations continued to back two Dinant palm-oil-waste-to-biogas projects through its Clean Development Mechanism. Corporación Dinant denied committing human rights violations or forcibly evicting intruders from its land. It claimed that "externally funded armed groups, with no interest in farming, are using the conflicts in Honduras for wider political ends by encouraging the illegal seizure of private lands."

Media reports and leaked US Embassy cables suggest that an airstrip on Facussé's property has been used for to transit cocaine.

In 2014, an internal World Bank investigation said that the International Finance Corporation violated its own social and environmental rules in approving a $30m loan to Facussé. However, in its 2015 report on Honduras, the International Criminal Court stated that "criminal organisations and international drug cartels are deeply involved in local businesses and criminal activities in the region and seem to be involved in most of the alleged crimes in the Bajo Aguán, including unlawful occupations of land and robbery of African palm fruits, in order to retain control of the region and to continue to operate in total impunity."

In 2019, Dinant became a provisional membership of the Voluntary Principles on Security and Human Rights, an internationally recognized benchmark that strictly governs how organizations vet, recruit and train their security men and women, and how they engage with local communities.
