= Electricity sector in Honduras =

Electricity sector of Honduras
Data
- Electricity coverage (2006): 69% (total), 94% (urban), 45% (rural); (LAC total average in 2005: 92%)
- Installed capacity (2006): 1.54 GW
- Share of fossil energy: 62%
- Share of renewable energy: 38% (including hydro)
- GHG emissions from electricity generation (2003): 1.51 MtCO_{2}
- Average electricity use (2005): 4376 kWh per connection
- Distribution losses (2006): 21%; (LAC average in 2005: 13.6%)

Consumption by sector (% of total)
- Residential: 42.5%
- Industrial: 53.3% (inc. commercial)

Tariffs and financing
- Average residential tariff (US$/kW·h, 2006): 00.058; (LAC average in 2005: 0.115)
- Average industrial tariff (US$/kW·h, 2006): 0.1053(medium voltage), 0.0934 (high voltage); (LAC average in 2005: 0.107)
- Average commercial tariff (US$/kW·h, 2006): 0.133
- Annual investment in electricity: 4.01 US$ per capita

Services
- Sector unbundling: Partial
- Share of private sector in generation: 62%
- Share of private sector in distribution: 0%
- Competitive supply to large users: No
- Competitive supply to residential users: No

Institutions
- No. of service providers: One (ENEE)
- Responsibility for transmission: Integrated utility (Empresa Nacional de Energía Eléctrica)
- Responsibility for regulation: National, single-sector regulator
- Responsibility for policy-setting: Energy Cabinet
- Responsibility for the environment: Ministry of Environment (SERNA)
- Electricity sector law: Yes (1994)
- Renewable energy law: Yes (2007)
- CDM transactions related to the electricity sector: 19 registered CDM projects; 221,730 t CO_{2}e annual emissions reductions

The electricity sector in Honduras has been shaped by the dominance of a vertically integrated utility; an incomplete attempt in the early 1990s to reform the sector; the increasing share of thermal generation over the past two decades; the poor financial health of the state utility Empresa Nacional de Energía Eléctrica (ENEE); the high technical and commercial losses in transmission and distribution; and the low electric coverage in rural areas

The key challenges in the sector include financing investments in generation and transmission in the absence of either a financially healthy utility or of concessionary funds by external donors. Tariffs need to be re-balanced, arrears need to be cut and commercial losses, including electricity theft, need to be reduced without fostering social unrest. In addition, the government must reconcile environmental concerns with its objective to build two new large dams and associated hydroelectric plants. Access to electricity in rural areas needs to be improved.

In June 2007, the president of Honduras, Manuel Zelaya, declared an "energia emergencia". An Intervention Board (Junta Interventoria), headed by the Minister of Defence and the Minister of Finance, was temporarily put in charge of ENEE to address the crisis. The mandate of this board has recently been extended until October 2022

== Electricity supply and demand ==
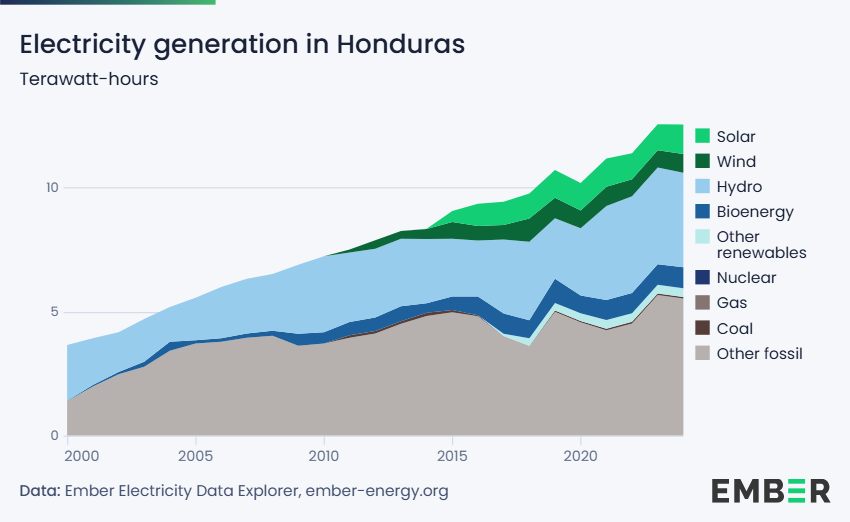
Electricity generation in Honduras in terawatt-hours

=== Installed capacity and expansion plans ===
With an installed generation capacity of 1,568 MW (2007), Honduras relies on a thermal-based power system (accounting for nearly two-thirds of its total installed capacity), which is very vulnerable to high and volatile international oil prices. The generation mix is as follows:

Source	Installed capacity(MW)	Installed capacity(%)
State owned	589	38
Hydroelectric	464	30
Thermal	125	8
Diesel motors	92	6
Gas turbines	33	2
Privately owned	979	62
Hydroelectric	55	3
Thermal	924	59
Diesel motors	816	52
Gas turbines	40	3
Biomass	68	4
TOTAL	1,568	100

Firm electricity generation capacity is substantially lower than installed capacity due to seasonality (i.e. the natural uncertainty affecting hydroelectric generation), the old age of some of the plants, and mothballing of thermal capacity.

=== Demand ===
Total electricity sold in 2007 was 4,932 GWh. In 2005, electricity sold by connection was 4,376 kWh, which was much higher than in the neighboring countries of Guatemala (2,337 kWh per connection), Nicaragua (2,931 kWh per connection) and El Salvador (3,109 kWh per connection). It is, however, much lower than in the more developed Central American countries, such as Costa Rica (7,969 kWh) and Panama (7,574 kWh).

In 2007, the percentages of electricity sold by consumer type were:

- Residential: 42%
- Commercial: 24%
- Industrial: 13%
- Large consumers: 13%
- Public lighting: 2.5%
- Government: 2%
- Autonomous entities: 2%
- Municipalities: 1%
- Exports: 0.5%

=== Demand projections ===
Peak demand has grown over seven percent annually in recent years, reaching 1,088 MW in 2006. For the period 2006–2010, the expected annual growth rate of energy demand is expected to be around six percent, while peak demand could increase at around seven percent. The actual growth rate will depend on whether electricity tariffs are increased, the success of a current program to decrease electricity theft and whether technical distribution losses can be reduced.

While peak demand in 2006 was below total installed capacity, it lay slightly above firm capacity. According to supply and demand projections by the World Bank, new generation capacity to be commissioned in the period between 2007–2010 will not be enough to meet demand growth, which means that an energy shortfall is likely to happen in the near future.

=== Interconnection with neighboring countries ===
The Honduran electricity grid is interconnected with the grids of its neighbors Nicaragua, El Salvador and Guatemala. However, the capacity of the interconnections is limited. It is expected to be expanded as part of the Central American Electric Interconnection System (SIEPAC) through a 230 kV transmission line with a capacity of 300 MW. (See Regional integration, the SIEPAC project below)

In 2002, Honduras imported about 420 GW·h of electricity (more than 10% of its consumption) without any exports, thus making it a net importer of electricity.

== Access to electricity ==
The overall electricity coverage is 69%. In rural areas it reaches only 45%, which contrast with the 94% coverage in urban areas (2006). The table below presents the access data per number of households and consumers.

	Population	%	No. of Households	%	No. of Customers	%	Access Rate (%)
Urban	3,350,081	45.5%	700,507	49.0%	661,582	66.9%	94.4%
Rural	4,016,940	54.5%	729,611	51.0%	327,114	33.1%	44.8%
TOTAL	7,367,021	100%	1,430,118	100%	988,696	100%	69.1%

Source: World Bank, 2007

The Electricity Coverage Index by department shows great disparities. Cortes and Islas de Bahia enjoy almost a 100% household coverage, while Lempira and Intibuca only have 24.6% and 36.2% coverage respectively.

Electrification was programmed under the 1994 Electricity Law for the Electricity Sector through the creation of the Social Fund for Electricity Development (FOSODE). The Government has set a target to increase national electricity coverage to 80% by 2015, giving equal priority to urban and rural. So far, the outcome has been positive, with an increase in national coverage from 43% in 1994 to 69% in 2006.

By 2015, 400,000 new connections are expected to be made. However, lack of financing has slowed grid development, causing it to lag behind demand.

== Service quality ==
=== Interruption frequency and duration ===
Power outage duration is a measure of the reliability of supply to the distribution networks. This measure decreased for most regions in Honduras from 2001. However, in 2005, a general increase in the interruption duration occurred. The total duration of interruptions per connection (36 hours per year in 2005, compared to 24 hours in 2004, but 135 hours in 1999 in the aftermath of Hurricane Mitch) is about twice as high as the average for Latin America and the Caribbean (14 hours per connection in 2005). However, the frequency of such interruptions has been higher in other countries, meaning that Honduras has a few long outages, while other countries have more frequent shorter ones.

=== Distribution and transmission losses ===
In the period 2001-2006, electricity losses increased from about 20% to 25%, compared to 8% in Chile and almost 30% in Nicaragua. This relatively high level of losses is due mostly to theft, fraud, and illegal connections. A recent study estimated that technical losses are about 10%, which implies that current commercial losses are about 15%, 30% of which correspond to fraud, 29% to illegal settlements and 29% to billing errors.

Transmission and sub-transmission investments keep being delayed due to financial constraints. This situation, if further sustained, would increase the frequency of blackouts and would make it hard to reduce operating costs and technical losses.

Loss-reduction programs implemented during 2007 brought total losses down to 21.2%, 3.5% in transmission and 17.7% in distribution.

(See Distributional losses for comparison with the rest of LAC).

== Responsibilities in the electricity sector ==
=== Policy and regulation ===
==== De jure situation ====
The Electricity Law of 1994 assigns the policymaking function to an Energy Cabinet chaired by the President of the Republic with the Ministry of Natural Resources and Environment (Secretaria de Recursos Naturales y Ambiente, SERNA) as its secretary and coordinator. A regulatory agency, the Comisión Nacional de Energía (CNE), was created to take charge of, among other functions:

- Supervise power sales agreements to be signed by distribution companies;
- Approve standards related to service quality, reliability and safety;
- Monitor and enforce laws and standards;
- Approve tariffs and propose Average Short-Term Marginal costs;
- Approve system expansion programs;
- Submit for approval to the Ministry of Environment power purchase and sales agreements that ENEE intends to sign.

==== De facto situation ====
The Energy Cabinet has met less than once a year since its creation. Also, SERNA has not been proactive in its role as the Cabinet’s secretary and coordinator to set the agenda and to supply the technical groundwork for decisions. CNE has had a marginal role due to a lack of political support and resources. As a result of this void at the cabinet level, the national utility Empresa Nacional de Energía Eléctrica (ENEE) has become the default point for energy expertise, sought by the government even in matters of policymaking and regulation, which contributes to a weak separation of roles among utility, regulatory agency and the ministry.

ENEE is governed by a board of directors, which is formed by: the Minister of Natural Resources and the Environment (SERNA), who chairs the board, the Minister of Public Works, Transportation and Housing, the Minister of Finance, the Minister of Industry and Commerce, the Minister of Foreign Cooperation, and a representative of the Honduran Council of Private Enterprise (COHEP). The board appoints a general manager, who acts as its secretary but has no vote.

=== Generation ===
Under the 1994 Electricity Law, generation may be undertaken by state, mixed ownership, or private entities. These entities are entitled to sell power to large consumers or to ENEE. As a result, private investors will mainly embark on new generation projects, including hydropower and alternative energy.

Every two years, ENEE must submit to the Regulator system expansion plans (i.e. procurement of new generation capacity and transmission expansion), which are to be approved by the Energy Cabinet.

By law, ENEE has a mandate to prioritize renewable-based generation when determining the optimal expansion plan. The condition is that the net present value of sequence including renewable-based generation must not exceed by more than 10% that of the least-cost expansion plan.

Private electricity generators using renewable energy have formed a National Association—Associación de Productores de Energía Renovable de Honduras (APERH)—to promote the use of renewable energy.

=== Transmission ===
By law, transmission networks are subject to an "open access" rule. They can be built and owned by public, private, or mixed ownership operating enterprises. However, in practice Empresa Nacional de Energía Eléctrica (ENEE) is responsible for transmission and system operations through its dispatch center, which determines the system’s hourly marginal cost of generation.

In the case of isolated systems, the main generator is responsible for operating the transmission system and handling dispatch.

=== Distribution ===
==== De jure situation ====
The 1994 Law mandated ENEE to divide its distribution network by regions. The partition, which was to be approved by ENEE, would be followed by the sale of those networks to cooperatives, municipalities, workers' associations, other similar types of groups, or to private companies, always subject to approval by the National Congress. The Law established that electricity distribution was to be carried out "in priority" by private companies under a concession regime. Distributors need to have a valid supply contract with generators for at least five years duration (however, the law does not mandate a minimum quantity).

==== EEH private distribution entity ====
The 18th of February EEH, an international consortium, signed a contract assuming responsibility for the operation and maintenance of the electrical distribution network, the commercial operation and its optimization, reduction and control of technical and non-technical losses, and for the collection of payments with the users.

==== Power frequency and voltage ====
In Honduras the residential power plugs and sockets are of type A and B. The standard voltage is 120 V and the standard frequency is 60 Hz.

== Renewable energy ==

In Honduras, there is great potential in untapped indigenous renewable energy resources. Due to the likely long-term trend of high oil prices, such resources could be developed at competitive prices. However, except for the large hydro projects, the potential for the development of renewable energy has yet to be explored.

== Energy efficiency ==
Honduras has a very large potential to develop energy efficiency programs. Large improvements could be made in the areas of air conditioning for both the residential and commercial sectors, where the implementation of measures in the area of demand management and the rational use of energy could prevent unplanned blackouts.

Some progress has been made recently under the Generación Autónoma y Uso Racional de Energía Eléctrica (GAUREE) project, financed by the European Union between 2000 and 2007. The GAUREE 2 project aims at increasing the use of energy-efficient Compact fluorescent lamps (CFLs), lowering the consumption of energy by 50 million kW·h per year. The plan of action includes giving away, in a three-phased operation, a free 20 W CFL bulb to 800,000 households (the majority of Honduran households still use inefficient 60 W, 75 W, and 100 W bulbs).

The Inter-Institutional Group for the Efficient Use of Energy (GIURE) has set out a plan with the objective of reducing national electricity demand by 100 MW in 2008. This would entail an 8% reduction of the maximum demand forecast by ENEE. Some of the main activities included in GIURE's program are: promotion of gas stove use, use of clean development mechanisms (CDM), educational campaigns, efficiency in the industrial and commercial sectors, etc.

== History ==
=== Early monopoly and hydro-based expansion ===
ENEE was created in 1957 by Decree 48, the Ley Constitutiva de la Empresa Nacional de Energía Eléctrica—the Constitutive Law. Its mandate was to promote the country’s electrification through the study, construction and operation of electrification works, government representation in any company in which the government was a shareholder, and to provide assistance to any private generator or distributor that required it.

In its initial two and a half decades, the expansion of ENEE was boosted by the technical and financial support of international financial organizations. Hydroelectric projects abounded and the transmission network expanded to incorporate all economically active areas of the country into the national grid, which was interconnected with Nicaragua (1976), Costa Rica (1982) and Panama (1986). The largest project, the hydroelectric plant of El Cajón (300 MW) on the Rio Comayagua in Central Honduras was commissioned in 1985. At that time Honduras had an installed capacity of 560 MW and a peak demand of only 220 MW.

The demand growth projections did not materialize, which left the country with a large excess capacity and ENEE with a heavy debt burden. As a result, the existing thermal power plants were not well maintained. When demand eventually caught up and a severe drought occurred, many of the thermal plants were inoperative, leading to a severe energy crisis in 1993.

=== 1994 Electricity Law and the resurgence of fossil fuels ===
The 1994 new Electricity Law, passed under the administration of President Carlos Roberto Reina, was born as a response to the crisis. It contained provisions for the establishment of a competitive power market (vertical unbundling, freedom of entry to all sector activities, open access to transmission and distribution networks, and freedom of choice for large users); the separation of the roles of policy making, regulation, and provision of electricity services; application of cost-recovery tariffs and targeted subsidies; and private provision of electricity services.

The establishment of the new competitive market failed: the distribution networks were not un-bundled and privatized, and ENEE continued operating as a vertically integrated state-owned enterprise that maintained its central role in energy planning and policy making. In addition, the principles of cost covering tariffs and targeted subsidies were not properly implemented due both to inadequate political commitment and to an important dependency on imported oil for power generation. This led to high and volatile generation prices that were not passed on to retail tariffs.

In the 1990s, thermoelectric generation has come to lead a system that was dominated by hydropower: Hydropower plant capacity has gone from 90% to only 30%. The reasons for this shift are twofold. First, hydroelectric development became more expensive when funding through interest-free loans for its development from International financial institutions was cut. Second, the lower risks and shorter maturity of thermal generation projects, as perceived by private investors, directed generation expansion towards the use of heavy fuel oil and medium speed diesels.

In addition, it is worth mentioning the close relationships between oil importers, power generating companies and certain government officers, which through the last decade have been accused by the Honduran media of artificially containing the investment in renewable energy sources, favoring oil imports and the extension of very expensive and less than transparent electricity generation contracts.

=== The emergence of Independent Power Producers ===
Power Purchase Agreements (PPAs) that ENEE has signed with independent power producers (IPP) running fossil fuel power plants now account for the majority of energy generation in Honduras. According to the Interamerican Development Bank, these PPAs were "expensive and with clauses that made them very inflexible".

As early as in 1993, during the government of Rafael Leonardo Callejas (1990–1994), ENEE signed its first PPA with an IPP for the provision of thermal energy. The contract was signed with Electricidad de Cortés (Elcosa) for a period of 17 years. One year later, Carlos Roberto Reina (1994–1998) approved two giant 10-year contracts for Empresa de Mantenimiento, Construcción y Electricidad (EMCE), which itself belongs to the Honduran Terra group, and the Honduran energy company Luz y Fuerza de San Lorenzo (Lufussa). EMCE and Lufussa managed to sign new contracts with the government of Carlos Flores (1998–2002), which included tax exemptions for up to five years and the payment of fixed and variable charges, the former independently of whether energy was actually being produced, as it is typically the case in PPAs.

The government of Ricardo Maduro (2002–2006) signed two more 12-year contracts with Enersa - partners of EMCE - and Lufussa. However, in November 2002, it quickly signed another 12-year contract for US$477 million with the Honduran subsidiary of AES Corporation, under which AES Honduras was to supply some 200 megawatts of power. In September 2003 ENEE canceled that contract as well, because the provider allegedly failed to fulfill certain clauses and was behind schedule.

=== Renewable energy promotion and a comeback of hydropower ===
Under the Presidency of Carlos Flores, decrees No. 85-98 and 267-98 were approved in 1998 by the Honduras Congress with the aim of promoting the development of renewable energy-generating plants. The new legislation included tax breaks to developers and a secure buyer arrangement for energy at prices equivalent to the system’s short-term marginal cost. ENEE, which is the default buyer, must pay a premium (10% of the same short-run marginal cost) for the electricity generated when the installed capacity is below 50 MW. This framework has facilitated the negotiation of about 30 public-private partnerships with ENEE for small renewable energy plants. In addition, Decree No. 85-98 also established tax exemptions in favor of developers: import and sales taxes on equipment, and a five-year income tax holiday.

The government considers renewable resources a vital element of its strategy to diversify energy supply, reduce vulnerability to external shocks, and mitigate the environmental impacts of energy production. The development of large hydropower projects and the provision of further incentives for grid-connected renewable projects are the present priorities of the government in the renewable energy sector. The penetration of renewable energy technologies into rural electrification programs is still limited and most rural electrification activities are grid extensions.

According to the World Bank, the potential for the development of off-grid and small renewable sources is largely unexploited due to a lack of incentives and a clear and consistent policy framework.

=== Regional integration, the SIEPAC project ===
In 1995, after almost a decade of preliminary studies, the Central American governments, the government of Spain and the Inter-American Development Bank agreed to the execution of the SIEPAC project. This project aims at the electric integration of the region. Feasibility studies showed that the creation of a regional transmission system would be very positive for the region and lead to a reduction in electricity costs and to improvements in the continuity and reliability of supply. In 1996, the six countries—Panama, Honduras, Guatemala, Costa Rica, Nicaragua and El Salvador—signed the Framework Treaty for the Electricity Market in Central America.

The design of the Regional Electricity Market (MER) was done in 1997 and approved in 2000. MER is an additional market superimposed on the existing six national markets, with a regional regulation, in which the agents authorized by the Regional Operational Body (EOR) carry out international electricity transactions in the region. As for the infrastructure, EPR (Empresa Propietaria de la Red S.A.) is in charge of the design, engineering, and construction of about 1,800 km (1,100 mi) of 230kV transmission lines. The project is expected to be operational by the end of 2008.

=== Operation scissor, declaration of emergency, and tariff increase ===
In February 2007, ENEE initiated a program to reduce arrears and commercial losses under the heading Operación Tijera (Operation Scissor). It entails coordinated action from all ministries and government agencies aiming to cut service (a) to delinquent clients, and (b) to any users detected during the operation with irregular service connections or with meters that have been tampered with. According to press reports, the operation has led to an instantaneous increase in collections.

In June 2007, President Manuel Zelaya declared an "energy emergency" in order to buy additional electricity and to overcome the country's energy crisis. The Minister of Defense is charged with resolving the crisis, and together with the Minister of Finance, was put at the head of an Intervention Board of ENEE. The mandate of the Intervention Board has been extended until October 2008.

In an attempt to address ENEE's delicate financial situation, the government intends to raise tariffs for certain consumers, those whose bills are the highest. This increase, which will bring tariffs closer to costs, would not affect residential users whose consumption is below 100 kWh. A 16% tariff increase for fuel adjustment was already applied in January 2008. According to the new manager of ENEE, an additional 11% adjustment will be applied in May. The overall target, established in the "Financial Plan for the Strengthening of ENEE" is for tariffs to have increased by 27% at the end of 2008.

== Tariffs, cost recovery and subsidies ==
According to the law, a tariff reflecting generation and transmission costs would be the regulated power price for distributors. The tariff, to be published in the official Gazette in order to become effective, had to be calculated yearly by the generators and approved by the regulator, who would also decide on any subsequent adjustments to it. However, ENEE has failed to apply this 1994 Law’s provision for the calculation and implementation of cost-covering tariffs and of localized subsidies.

=== Residential, commercial and industrial tariffs ===
Average tariffs for industrial and commercial consumers already cover economic costs and are some of the highest in the region. However, the average tariff for the residential category is 60% of the economic cost of supply, and only 54% after deducting the Government's direct subsidy.

Households consuming less than 100 kW·h per month pay a tariff which only covers 22% of the cost, while those consuming between 0 and 300 kW·h—84% of all residential clients—only pay 395 percent of the cost. Even clients consuming more than 500 kW·h per month pay only 82% of the cost of supply. Tariffs for municipalities are equivalent to about 77% of the cost. The table below shows the average cost of supply and the current final price (after direct subsidy) for the different users:

	Average Cost of Supply (kW·h)	Current final price (after direct subsidy) ($/kW·h)	No. of Users
Residential Block (kW·h/month)			
0-50	0.224	0.039	174,338
51-100	0.158	0.04	132,804
101-150	0.147	0.047	128,361
151-300	0.141	0.066	242,723
301-500	0.137	0.089	83,368
501-	0.134	0.109	43,747
Industrial medium voltage	0.107	0.105	134
Commercial	0.13	0.133	59,700

Source: World Bank, 2007

By way of comparison, the weighted average residential tariff in Latin America and the Caribbean at the end of 2005 was US$0.115 per kW·h, while the industrial weighted average was US$0.107 per kW·h. Clearly, residential tariffs in Honduras are below the regional average.

=== Cost recovery ===
The overall result of the distortions in the tariff structure is that just 81% of economic costs of supply are covered, leading to a financial situation that is unsustainable in the short term and could lead the country to face a severe energy crisis by 2010.

=== Direct subsidies and cross subsidies ===
A direct subsidy was established in 1994 to compensate for any tariff increase to eligible residential users (those that consume less than 300 kW·h per month). In the period (2001–2005), the Government paid about US$75.6 million in direct tariff subsidies to residential consumers.

The explicit cross-subsidy incorporated in the current tariff does not respect the caps set by the 1994 Electricity Law as it has benefited most residential consumers, making the compensatory surcharges to other consumer categories (i.e. commercial and industrial) also exceed the mandated limits. Also, the generalized subsidy and the direct subsidy paid by the Government are poorly targeted and regressive. Non-poor consumers (i.e. those consuming above 150 kW·h/month), have been benefited most by the cross-subsidy as they currently pay between 50% and 80% of economic costs. This has resulted in one of the lowest residential tariffs in the region and also in high consumption—about 200 kW·h per month in residential use. This figure doubles the average residential use in El Salvador and Guatemala, whose per capita income is more than double that of Honduras. Inefficient interfuel substitution is another result of low electricity prices, particularly for cooking and water heating, since electricity, although a more inefficient and economically expensive option, is cheaper for the consumer than, for instance, liquefied petroleum gas (LPG).

== Investment and financing ==
Investments in the sector are carried out by ENEE, the Social Electrification Fund FOSODE and the private sector. ENEE has no self-financing capacity and virtually no capacity to take on new debt or other financial obligations such as those arising from PPAs. ENEE's poor financial health casts doubt on its ability to finance the planned major investments in new generation capacity.

=== Investment by sub-sector ===
In the period 1997-2006, ENEE has invested about US$189 million in its activities. The areas that have received the largest funding have been distribution and transmission.

=== Financing ===
==== Private developers ====
Between 1994 and 2006, private developers have invested some US$600 million in about 800 MW of medium speed diesel and gas turbine capacity. Private investors have also invested about US$70 million in 110 MW of small hydro- and bagasse-fired capacity. Reliance on the private sector has become the norm for generation capacity expansion.

==== Short-term credit ====
Distribution and transmission investment by ENEE has been partially financed with expensive revolving loans from local banks and credits from thermal generators on the payment of energy purchases that amounted to US$124 million in 2003–05. Debt service coverage and contribution to investments have been negative during the past five years.

==== Concessionary funding ====
As explained in more detail in the section on external assistance further below, concessionary funding by international donors is currently directed only at rural electrification, new renewable energy technologies and energy efficiency.

The largest investments in rural electrification have been made by FOSODE, which has been successful in raising international aid funds (both concessionary loans and grants), which complement the budgetary resources that the Government provides every year as required by law. The Fund receives additional financing from fees that municipalities impose on electricity companies in their jurisdiction. Between 1995 and 2006, FOSODE invested US$91.4 million in rural electrification.

==== Tax exemptions ====
The electricity sector enjoys several tax exemptions: import tax exemptions for fuels used by ENEE and other power companies for electricity generation, import and sales taxes on equipment and materials for rural electrification projects, import taxes on equipment and materials for power plants using renewable energy sources, and sales tax on electricity sales. According to the World Bank, the total average annual tax exemptions are estimated at about US$108 million, mostly fuel taxes (US$64.8 million) and sales taxes on electricity consumption (US$37.8 million).

== Summary of private participation in the electricity sector ==
Although the 1994 Electricity Law contained provisions for the establishment of a competitive power market—vertical unbundling, freedom of entry to all sector activities, open access to transmission and distribution networks, and freedom of choice for large users—ENEE has continued operating as a vertically integrated state-owned enterprise with total control over transmission and distribution.

As for generation, IPPs started to sign PPAs with ENEE as early as 1993. Today, IPPs account for over 60% of generation capacity, most of it thermal, in Honduras.

== Electricity sector and the environment ==
=== Responsibility for the environment ===
SERNA, the Ministry of Natural Resources and Environment, holds the responsibility in environmental issues, including climate change. This government agency is in a weak position due, among other things, to limited budgets and to the weakness of the civil service system. Also, ministry staff faces a total turnover whenever a new government takes over (i.e. every four years), which slows down its operations.

=== Greenhouse gas emissions ===
OLADE (Organización Latinoamericana de Energía) estimates that CO_{2} emissions from electricity production in 2003 were 1.51 million tons of CO_{2}, which represents 24% of total emissions from the energy sector

Other data (2004) report emissions of 6.04 MtCO_{2} from consumption and flaring of fossil fuels, which corresponds to 0.86 tCO_{2} per capita (Central and South America average: 2.35 tons).

=== Clean Development Mechanism projects in electricity ===
According to its promoter, Finnder, the small hydropower project Rio Blanco (50 MW) was the first small Clean Development Mechanism (CDM) registered in the World, with the first Certified Emission Reductions awarded in October 2005. Currently, there are eleven CDM-registered projects related to electricity generation in Honduras. Nine of those projects are hydro plants, which represent 80% (177,636 tCO_{2}e) of the total estimated annual emissions reductions. The two remaining projects are for cogeneration and biogas recovery and electricity generation.

== External assistance ==
Concessionary loans and grants from international financial institutions and bilateral donors in the Honduran energy sector are focused on rural electrification, energy efficiency and new renewable energy. This type of financing is limited. None of the current donor-funded projects supports large hydropower development, expansion of fossil energy generation or major investments in transmission, which are necessary to ensure that supply keeps up with demand and to maintain service quality.

=== World Bank ===
Currently, the World Bank is contributing funds and assistance through three projects related to the energy sector in Honduras:

- A US$2.35m Global Environmental Facility (GEF) project for rural electrification approved in December 2005 and implemented by the Honduran Social Fund (FHIS) Rural Electrification
- A Rural Infrastructure Project financed by a US$47m IDA credit and approved in December 2005. The project is also implemented by FHIS and is partially integrated with the GEF grant mentioned above.
- A US$ project for US$1.4m Carbon Emission Reduction Credits approved in December 2004 to support the construction of the La Esperanza hydro power plant, a 12 MW run of the river plant on the Intibuca River by a private developer called CISA (Consorcio de Inversiones S.A.).

=== Inter-American Development Bank ===
Currently, the Inter-American Development Bank is contributing funds and assistance to the following projects in the energy sector in Honduras:

- An Energy Sector Support Loan supported through a US$29 million credit approved in September 2008. This project will finance priority investments in transmission and support a program for reducing losses.
- A Rural Electrification project supported through a US$35m credit approved in November 2004 and implemented by ENEE, and
- A geothermal feasibility study in Platanares

The IDB has also financed an advanced pre-feasibility study for the Patuca 3 large hydroelectric project.

=== European Union ===
Between 2000 and 2007, the European Union (EU) has financed the Generación Autónoma y Uso Racional de Energía Eléctrica (GAUREE) project, which aims at increasing the use of energy-efficient CFLs. The total cost of the project is Euro 6.68 million (US$9.06 million), with a total contribution from the EU of Euro 5 million (US$6.785 million)

=== Others ===
Electrification projects have also been carried out with resources from the Central American Bank for Economic Integration (Banco Centroamericano de Integración Económica), and with cooperation from countries like Finland, Japan, Korea, and Norway. In addition, there is an agreement in place with the Fondo Cafetero Nacional (FCN) for the electrification of coffee-producing regions.

The president of the CBEI announced in July 2007 that the Bank would provide "strong" financing, consisting of a "first disbursement" of US$100 million. The funds would be invested in transmission lines which, according to the CBEI president, would generate sufficient cash flow to repay the loan.

== See also ==
- Water supply and sanitation in Honduras
- Economy of Honduras

== Sources ==
- World Bank, 2007. Honduras. Power Sector Issues and Options.
