= Fredy Nasser =

Honduran businessman

Fredy Antonio Nasser Selman (born 4 June 1956) is a Honduran businessman, head of the Terra Group (Grupo Terra). The group includes Petróleos de Honduras (Hondupetrol) and Interairports. From 2001 to 2006 the Group invested over $300 million. A 2006 study by the Friedrich Ebert Foundation named Nasser one of the three "most powerful men in Honduras" (along with "energy magnate Schucry Kafie, and banker and industrialist Jaime Rosenthal").

Nasser is a graduate in architecture of the Texas A&M University. He is the brother of Maria del Carmen Nasser, appointed Ambassador to Chile, and the son-in-law of Miguel Facussé Barjum.
