= Sula (brand) =

Honduran fruit juice brand

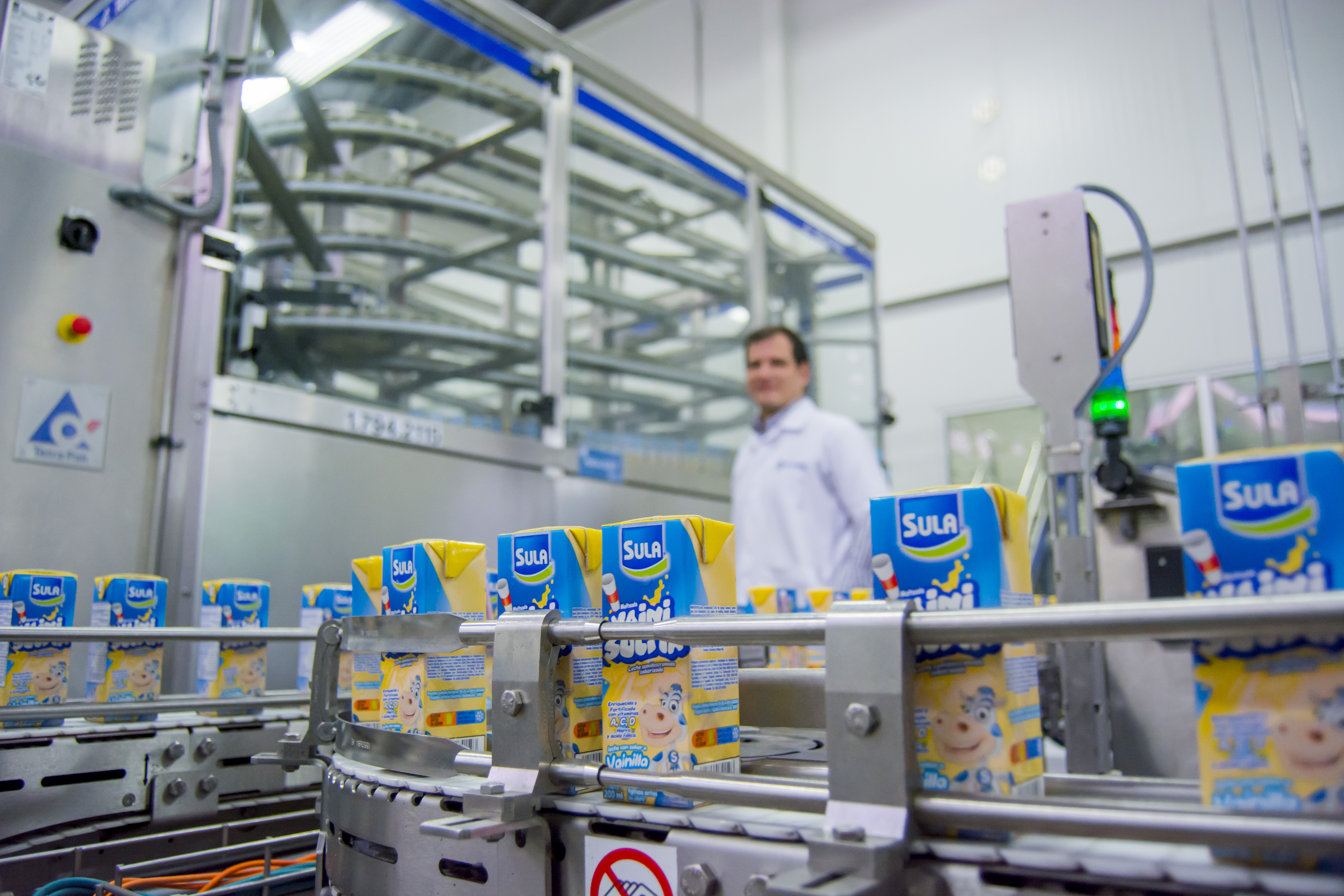
- Sula dairy production plant in operation
- Industry: Food and beverage
- Founded: 1960
- Headquarters: Honduras
- Area served: Central America, United States
- Key people: Schucry Kafie (Founder of parent company Lacthosa)
- Products: Dairy, fruit juices, creams, malts
- Website: sula.hn (Spanish homepage)

Sula is the largest Honduran brand of fruit juices and nectars, and one of the few Honduran brands to sell products internationally, including in the United States.

== History ==
Sula was founded in San Pedro Sula, in the Sula Valley of Honduras in 1960, as a social project in alliance with UNICEF. The objective of the project was the installation of a dairy production plant in northern Honduras. After a privatization process, the brand was acquired by Lacthosa in March 1992, shortly after Lacthosa had been established by Honduran entrepreneur Schucry Kafie. Lacthosa revitalized the Sula brand through the introduction of new products, particularly orange and fruit juices, cream, malts, and investment in modern technology.

== Products and exporting ==
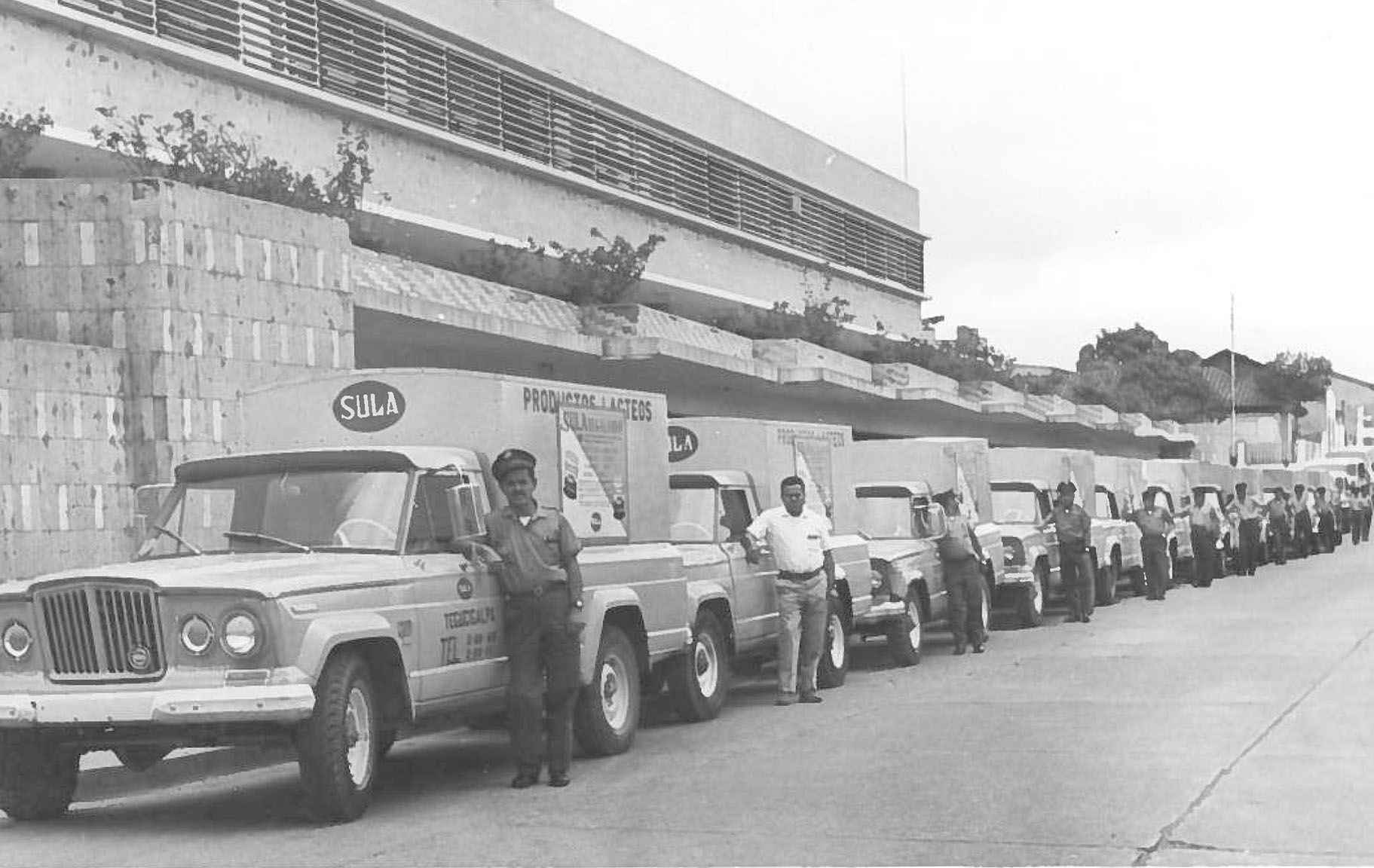
Sula antique milk truck dealers, date unknown

Juice products now include varieties of orange juice, apple juice, pineapple juice, guava, tamarind, and peach, pear, and apple nectars. As of 2017, Sula remains a subsidiary of Lacthosa, and is the primary producer of fruit juices and nectars for Lacthosa, and the brand name under which these products are sold.

The Sula brand has been described as "the flagship brand" of Lacthosa, and is also the brand name under which products are exported to other countries in Central America, and to the United States. In the mid-1990s, the Sula brand was positioned for sales in Guatemala and El Salvador, and in September 2001 Lacthosa entered the U.S. market after receiving an export permit from the U.S. Food and Drug Administration. In January 2015, Lacthosa invested $15 million to expand juice production and enable the export its products to a greater number of international markets. Countries to which the company exports products now include El Salvador, Guatemala, the Dominican Republic, and the United States (primarily to Florida and Texas). Lacthosa exports, primarily under the "Sula" brand name, account for seventy percent of the export of dairy products and their derivatives from Honduras. It distributes its products in the United States under Sula Food & Beverage Corporation.

In October, 2016, Sula joined with a number of other companies and organizations from various areas of Honduras in becoming incorporated with Marca País Honduras, which allows Sula to bear the stamp of the Honduras Brand as part of a national initiative to promote investment, exports, tourism, and national pride.
