= Lacthosa =

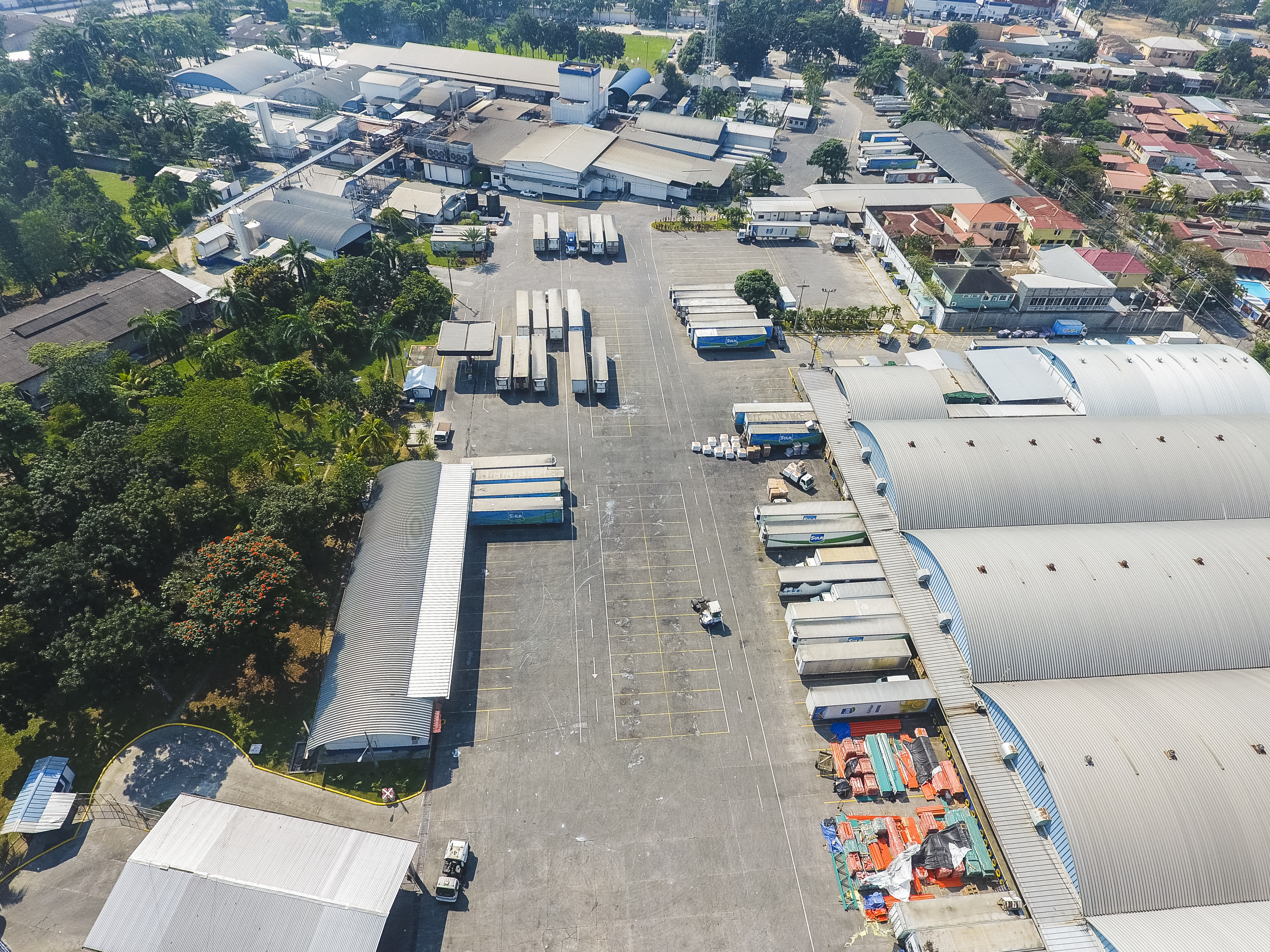
- Lacthosa dairy processing plant in San Pedro Sula
- Industry: Food and beverage
- Founded: 1992
- Headquarters: Honduras
- Area served: Honduras
- Key people: Schucry Kafie (Founder)
- Products: Dairy, fruit juices, and drinking water
- Website: lacthosa.com (English homepage)

Lacthosa (incorporated as Lácteos de Honduras S.A.) is a Honduran producer of food and beverage products, focusing on dairy and fruit juices. It leads the country in dairy production.

== History ==
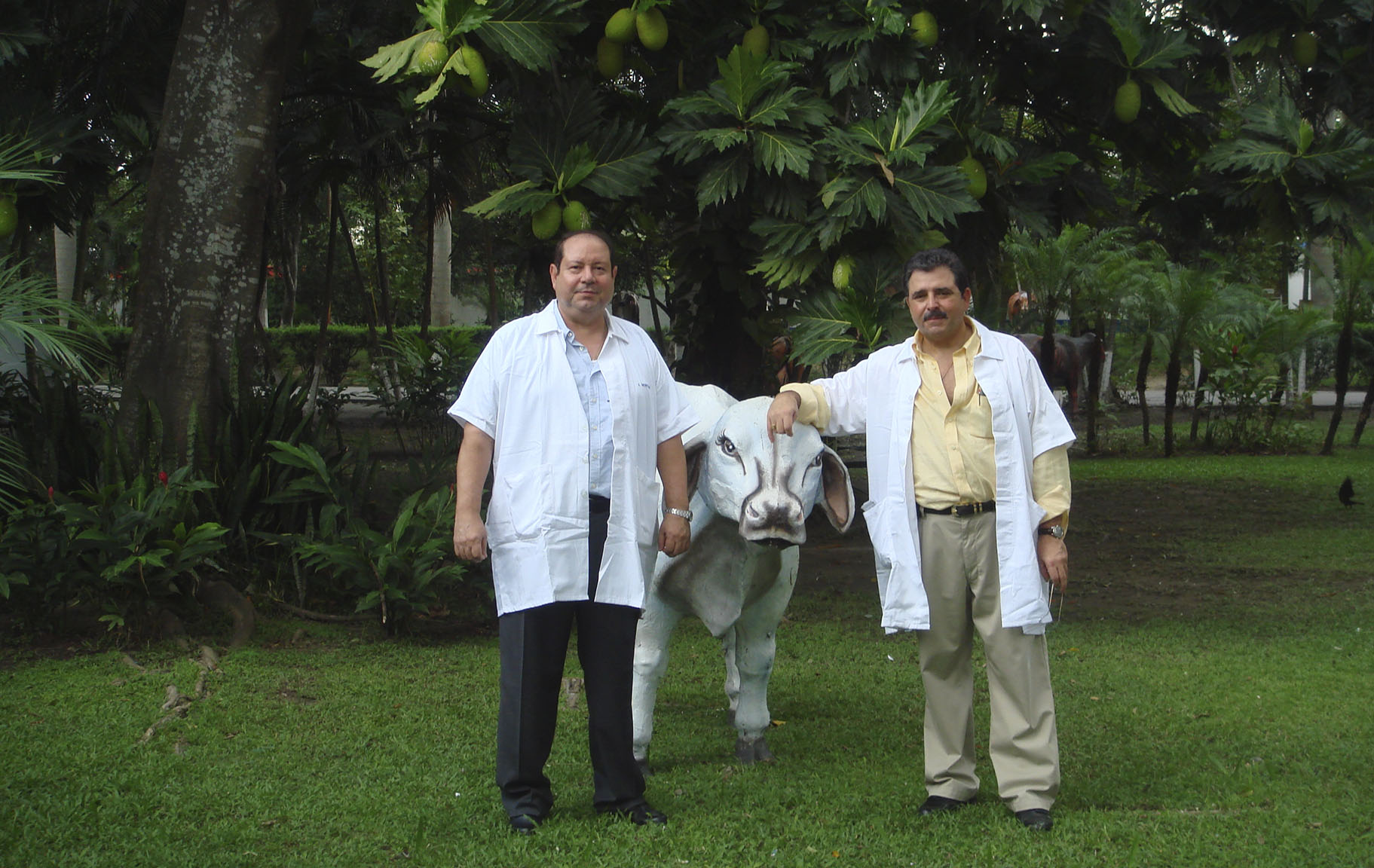
Lacthosa Processing plant Board of Directors, Julio Montessi and Founder Schucry Kafie.

Lacthosa was established by Honduran entrepreneur Schucry Kafie in 1992. The company constructed a plant in San Pedro Sula, Honduras, in March 1992. In the mid-1990s, the company positioned its "Sula" brand for sales in Guatemala and El Salvador, and in September 2001, Lacthosa entered the U.S. market after receiving an export permit from the U.S. Food and Drug Administration. A 1998 report from the Office of the First Lady of Honduras noted Lacthosa had donated thirty-thousand glasses worth of milk to Honduran schools that year to insure that students received adequate nutrition.

In October 2014, Lacthosa began selling cream butter in the Dominican Republic, and in January 2015, the company invested $15 million to expand juice production and enable the export of its products to a greater number of international markets. As of 2017, the company has five processing plants in Honduras, producing 140 million liters of milk in 50 municipalities in 14 departments, constituting the largest milk-producing enterprise in the country. Lacthosa sells over 250 products, including a variety of milk, malt, cream, cheeses, fruit juices, nectars, ice cream, yogurt, and purified water, distributed throughout Central America. Juice products include varieties of orange juice, apple juice, pineapple juice, guava, tamarind, and peach, pear, and apple nectars. The company has over 3,000 permanent employees, as well as 2,600 suppliers of fresh milk and 2,000 citrus farmers, generating 60,000 indirect farm and services jobs. In March 2017, Lacthosa was awarded the Orquídea Empresarial (Entrepreneurial Orchid Award) from the Honduran government for bringing Honduran products to international markets.

Countries to which the company exports its products include El Salvador, Guatemala, the Dominican Republic, and the United States (primarily to Florida and Texas). Lacthosa markets products under several brands, including Sula, Delta, Ceteco, La Pradera, Gaymont's, Chilly Willy and Fristy. Exports, primarily under the "Sula" brand name, account for seventy percent of their export of dairy products and their derivatives from Honduras.

== Brands ==
=== Sula ===
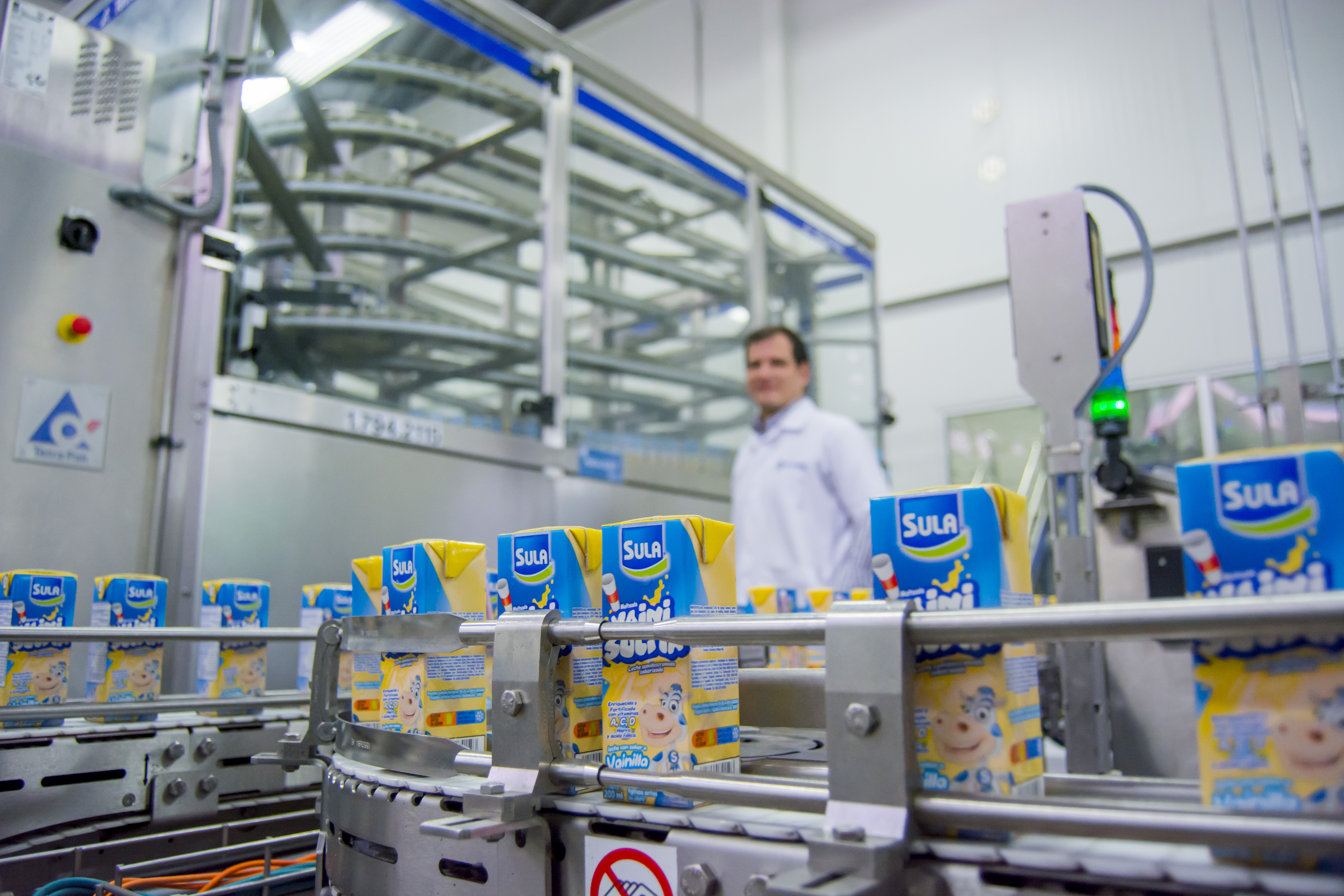
Sula Milkshakes Dairy Production Plant

Sula, founded in San Pedro Sula, in the Sula Valley of Honduras in 1960, as part of a UNICEF project, and acquired by Lacthosa in March 1992, is a subsidiary of Lacthosa which is the primary producer of fruit juices and nectars for Lacthosa, and the brand name under which these products are sold. The Sula brand has been described as "the flagship brand" of the company, and is the primary brand name under which exports to other countries in Central America, and to the United States, are sold. On October 19, 2016, Sula joined with other companies and organizations from various areas of Honduras in becoming incorporated with Marca País Honduras, which allows Sula to bear the stamp of the Honduras Brand as part of a national initiative to promote investment, exports, tourism, and national pride.

=== Ceteco ===
Ceteco is a Lacthosa subsidiary that is its producer of dairy products, particularly powdered milk, and the brand name under which these products are sold.

In September 2016, Ceteco launched a "Viaja como los Superhéroes Ceteco" ("Travel as the Super Heroes Ceteco") promotion, offering superhero themed prizes to consumers. Ceteco engages in regional charitable activities through which "130,000 food rations have been distributed in recent years in public schools throughout Honduras."

=== Other brands ===
Other brands under which Lacthosa products are sold include Delta (for a range of products), La Pradera (artisanal dairy products), Gaymont's (yogurt mixed with fruit or jelly), Chilly Willy, and Fristy (a vitamin-C enriched orange drink).

== Charitable activities ==
For many years, Lacthosa has provided milk for families. In 2015, the Honduran Foundation for Corporate Responsibility awarded Lacthosa its annual recognition for most socially responsible enterprise. In May 2017, Lacthosa signed a cooperation agreement with the Zamorano Pan-American Agricultural School to allow groups of agricultural students to compete in efforts to develop new cheese, milk and yogurt products, with the winning team to receive funding to attend the International Food Technologists Fair in Las Vegas, Nevada. In October 2016, Lacthosa won its seventh consecutive FUNDAHRSE seal from the Honduran Foundation for Corporate Social Responsibility, the only dairy company in Central America to receive this award seven consecutive times.
