= El Cajón Dam (Honduras) =

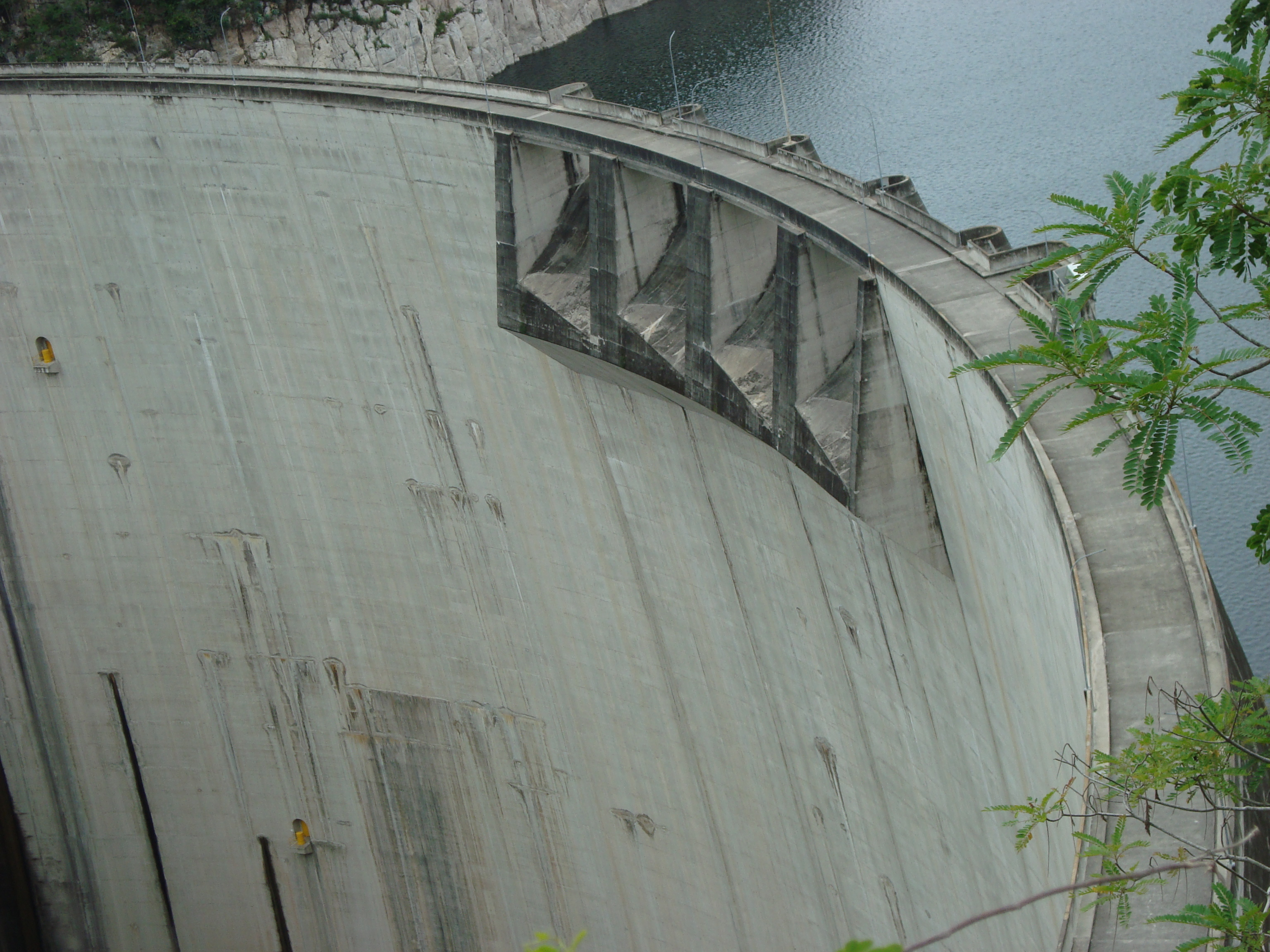

- Location within Honduras
- Official name: Central Hidroeléctrica Francisco Morazán
- Location: Cortés, Honduras
- Coordinates: 15°04′47″N 87°33′32″W
- Construction began: 1980
- Opening date: 1985
- Construction cost: US$775 million
- Operator: ENEE

Dam and spillways
- Impounds: Comayagua River
- Height: 226 m (741 ft)
- Length: 282 m (925 ft)
- Width (base): 48 m (157 ft)

Reservoir
- Total capacity: 5,700,000,000 m^{3} (2.0×10^{11} ft^{3})
- Surface area: 94 km^{2} (36 mi^{2})

Power Station
- Commission date: 1986
- Turbines: 4 × 75 MW Francis-type
- Installed capacity: 300 MW

The El Cajón Dam, officially known as Central Hidroeléctrica Francisco Morazán, is a hydroelectric power plant located in Western Honduras. The dam impounds the Comayagua River, which derives its large volume from two large tributaries, the Humuya River and the Sulaco River. El Cajón is a double arch dam, which uses parabolic geometry in horizontal and vertical axes to spread the weight of the impounded water to canyon walls which act as buttresses. Overall, the dam is the fifth highest dam in the Americas and the 15 th highest in the world, as well as the highest arch dam in the western hemisphere, and the sixth highest worldwide.

== Location ==
El Cajón Dam is located 180 km (112 mi) from Tegucigalpa, the country's capital, and 80 km (50 mi) from San Pedro Sula, the main Honduran industrial city.

== Construction ==
Harza Engineering of Chicago, Illinois, United States, began site investigation in the 1960s with initial construction beginning June 15, 1980. A multinational team of designers, builders and engineers included members from Italy, Germany, and Switzerland. Engineering design was developed by Motor Columbus [now Colenco] of Switzerland. Italian companies were responsible for the construction of the underground machine room, while Italian and German companies were responsible for dam construction and ancillary works. Upon completion the dam became the largest piece of infrastructure in Honduras, requiring over half a million cubic meters of concrete to construct. Due to its double-curved arch design, this dam is relatively thin compared to say, Hoover Dam (gravity dam design) that spans a similar valley profile yet required roughly four times as much concrete.

== Design ==
Finite element design was used for the structural components of the dam. The dam is 282 metres long, and 48 meters thick at bottom. The top is 7 meters thick which is wide enough for the small service road that crosses the dam. Around 170 meters from the base of the dam, three 14.5m^{2} discharge tubes expel water that has passed through the machine room's turbines. Near the top of the dam is a spillway composed of four large square tubes each 14 metres wide that are opened when flow through the dam cannot be handled by the lower discharge tubes.

== Reservoir ==
El Cajón Dam bridge
- Coordinates: 15°02′N 87°45′W

Characteristics
- Width: 7 m (23 ft)

Location
- Interactive map of El Cajón Dam bridge

The reservoir created by El Cajón spans 94 km^{2} with a maximum capacity of around 5,700 million m³. The reservoir displaced approximately 4,700 people. While the main purpose of the reservoir is for powering El Cajón's turbines, flood control is another major benefit. Before completion of the dam, yearly flooding in the Sula valley seriously disrupted commerce for the people of Honduras. Now during the rainy season the reservoir has the ability to retain a layer of water ten meters high, and then discharge it slowly to prevent disastrous flooding. Agriculture has also benefited. Historically, during the dry season the Comayagua's flow dropped significantly to around 20 m^{3}/s, the dam now provides year-round flow of approximately 100 m^{3}/s, which has had a significant economic impact for the region.

== Power output ==
Eight large vertical axis turbines are located in a subterranean housing stationed in the left side of the limestone valley. Construction was done in two stages. Initially, four turbines were installed in the room; which at the time was already fairly large: 110 m long, 30 m wide, and 49 m high. The second stage of construction extended the length another 65 meters to house the remaining four turbines. Each turbine rotates at 300 R.P.M, powering its own generator capable of producing 75 megawatts. The completion of the second stage brought the total power output to 600 megawatts. The power produced there is then transmitted to a central station at 230 kV.

== Instrumentation ==
Initially, electrical monitoring devices commonly used in modern dams were installed, but due to high sulphur content in the surrounding rock and water, all of the devices corroded and failed. With the exception of portable monitoring equipment, El Cajón now relies entirely on mechanical devices to check its performance.

- Mechanical extensometers, used for measuring settlement and linear deformation, are oriented in horizontal and vertical directions. These devices are spaced at different intervals horizontally throughout the dam with groups every 30 meters in elevation.
- V-Notch weirs are used to measure seepage through the curtain of the dam. One is located in a trench at the base of the dam on the lower right side
- Force balance accelerometers are used to measure motion of the dam, which is an indication of deformation. These devices are useful in monitoring damage from seismic events.
- Inverted pendulums – These devices measure vertical deformation of the dam. One end of a thin wire is attached to an anchor which is grouted in solid rock below the dam with the other end attached to a float station that is attached to the dam. Movement of the float relative to the anchor alerts dam operators to possible motion.
- Direct pendulum – This device is similar in operation to the inverted pendulum except the anchor is located at the top with the float tank located at the bottom. There are 21 direct and indirect pendulums located in El Cajón.
- Bourdon Pressure Gages are used to measure the static pressure of the water contained in the reservoir.
- Geodetic surveying stations are located at fixed reference points in the area surrounding the dam. "Object" points are installed on the face of the dam (look closely you can see the yellow drums). Surveyors use devices such as theodolites and total stations to compare changes in distance and elevation of the object points on the dam to the reference points. The information gathered gives dam operators a picture of how the dam is settling or if motion of the face is occurring.
- Inclinometers are installed in the dam's abutments to monitor slope stability. The device measures linear deformation.
- Seismographs are used to monitor vibration of the structural elements due to geologic activity. Because El Cajón lies on three fault lines, the collection of seismic information is crucial to making decisions about the dam's operation.

The important role these devices play came into focus after a 7.1 magnitude earthquake, originating 200 miles north of Tegucigalpa, caused massive damage to many pieces of infrastructure May 28, 2009. These devices were critical to determining the internal deformation of the structure.
