= Schucry Kafie =

Honduran businessman and philanthropist

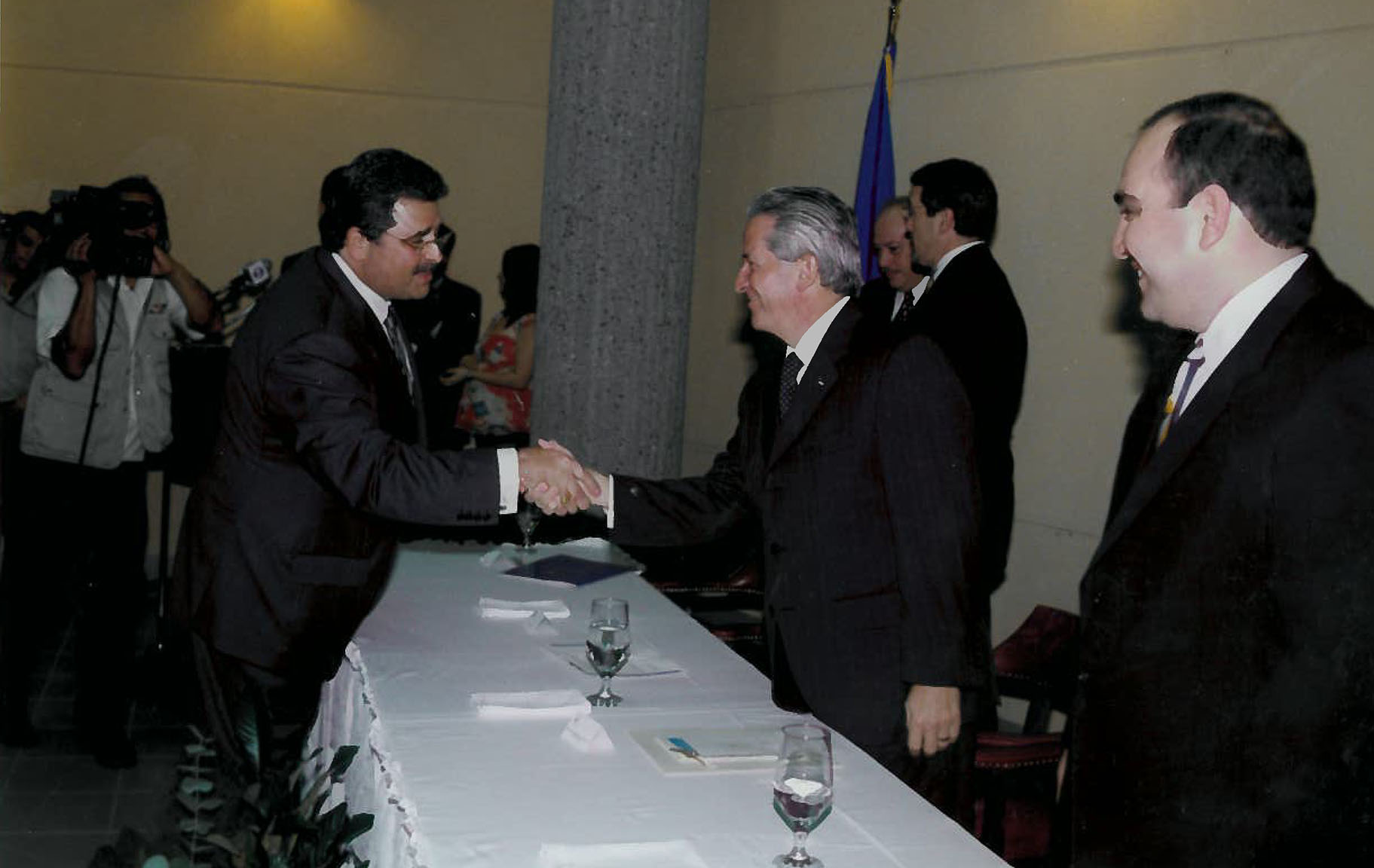
Schucry Kafie receiving the Sanchez-a-Sanchez-Smith-II Award.

Schucry Kafie (born November 11, 1947; spelled Schucrie in some sources) is a Honduran businessman and philanthropist noted for being the founder of Lácteos de Honduras S.A.—better known as Lacthosa—the country's largest dairy company. He is also a founding member, along with his brothers Luis and Eduardo, of Luz y Fuerza de San Lorenzo Sociedad Anónima—better known as Lufussa—the largest electricity supplier in Honduras.

== Early life, education, and career ==
Born in Tegucigalpa, Honduras, Kafie received a Bachillerato en Ciencias y Letras from the Instituto San Francisco in 1965, and then moved to Washington, D.C., United States to attend Georgetown University. He graduated from Georgetown with a Bachelor of Business Administration in 1971. Kafie worked for his parents' business until 1974, when he established New Mark Representaciones S. R. L., which "represented domestic and international companies" conducting business in Honduras. In 1984 Kafie was named "Honorary Consul of the Hashemite Kingdom of Jordan" in Honduras.

== Lacthosa and Lufussa ==
In 1988, Kafie founded Lacthosa, initially as a dairy company, and in 1994, he and his brothers founded Lufussa. In 2004, the Federation of Chambers of Commerce of the Central America (FEMAMCO) awarded Kafie the Orden FEMAMCO for promoting and strengthening Central American integration, as operator of Lacthosa. Through these companies, the wealth and influence of the Kafie family substantially increased, to the point that a 2006 study by the Friedrich Ebert Foundation named Kafie one of "the most powerful men in Honduras", citing Kafie's role with respect to Lufussa. Kafie has also been noted by a number of studies to be influential in a variety of other product categories, particularly including the dairy and fruit juice products sold by Lacthosa.

== Philanthropy ==
In 2006, Kafie, along with his brothers Luis and Eduardo, established the Fundación Chito y Nena Kafie (Chito and Nena Kafie Foundation), a family charitable organization, named for their parents (using their familiar names). The charity has engaged in a variety of projects aimed at improving the lives of Hondurans. In June 2017, for example the Foundation entered into a collaboration with the San Felipe General Hospital called "La Cajita de Nena" to donate natal care boxes providing supplies for mothers who give birth there.

== Personal life ==
Kafie married Marlene Nasser, a sister of Fredy Nasser in 1982. They have four daughters Stephanie, Elena, Vivian, and Marianne, all four of whom work for Lacthosa. Kafie's daughter Elena is Marketing and Sales Director for Lacthosa, and daughter Marianne is also a Lacthosa executive.
