= Punta Ratón =

Beach in Choluteca, Honduras

Punta Ratón is a beach located in the municipality of Marcovia, department of Choluteca, Honduras. It is positioned directly on the eastern shores of the Gulf of Fonseca.

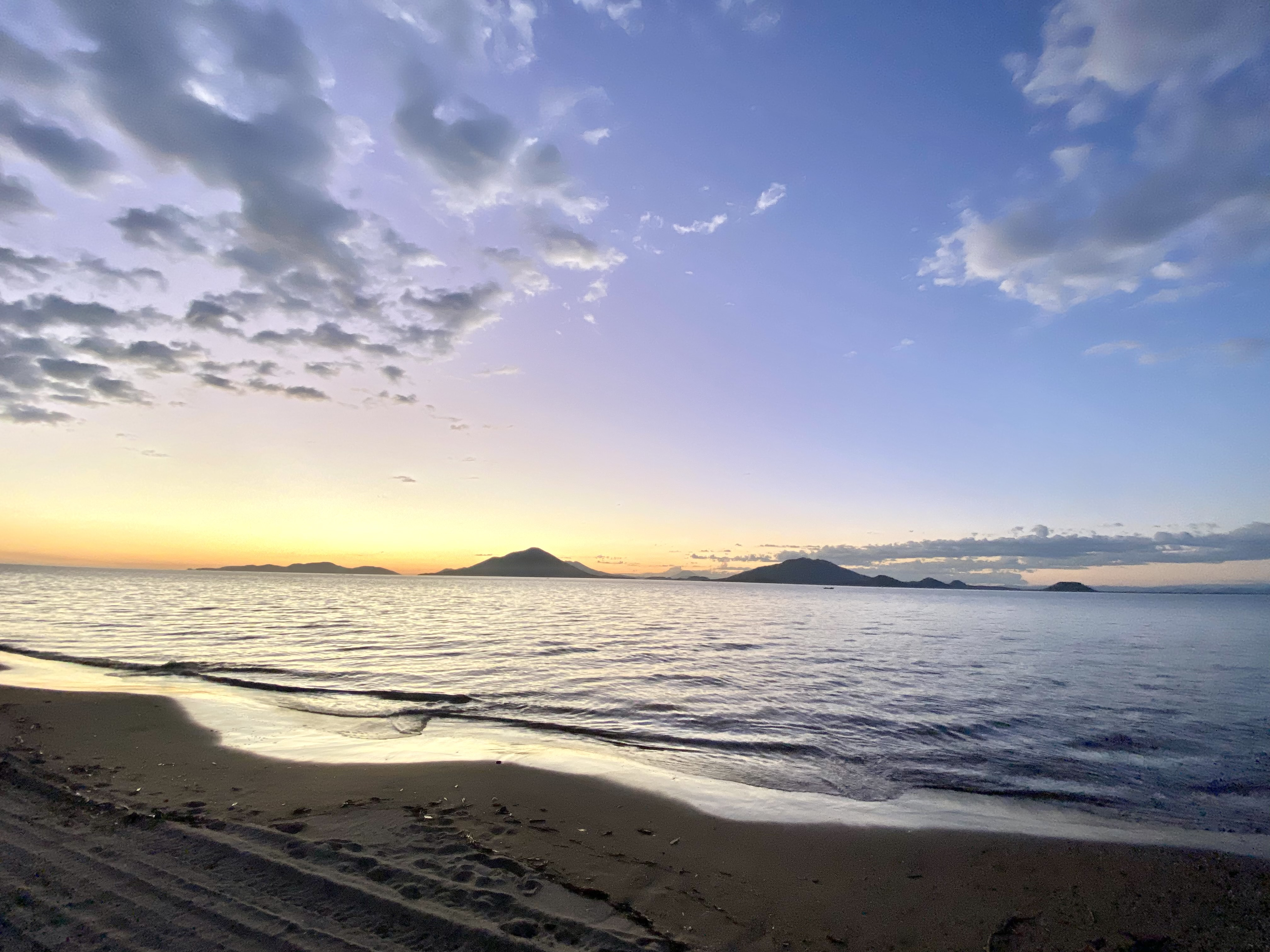
View from Punta Ratón, facing the Gulf of Fonseca and Amapala Island.

== Geography ==
The coastline of Punta Ratón has an extension of 2.85 miles across, located on the eastern edge of the Gulf of Fonseca. Its climate is typical of tropical and sub-tropical regions, with temperatures averaging between 25 and 30 °C. The vegetation is typical of a wetland ecosystem, with its shores mostly surrounded by various species of mangrove. Its coastline also serves as a hatching area for sea turtles, and the beach has served as a safe haven for the preservation of various species of turtles such as Lepidochelys olivacea in recent years.

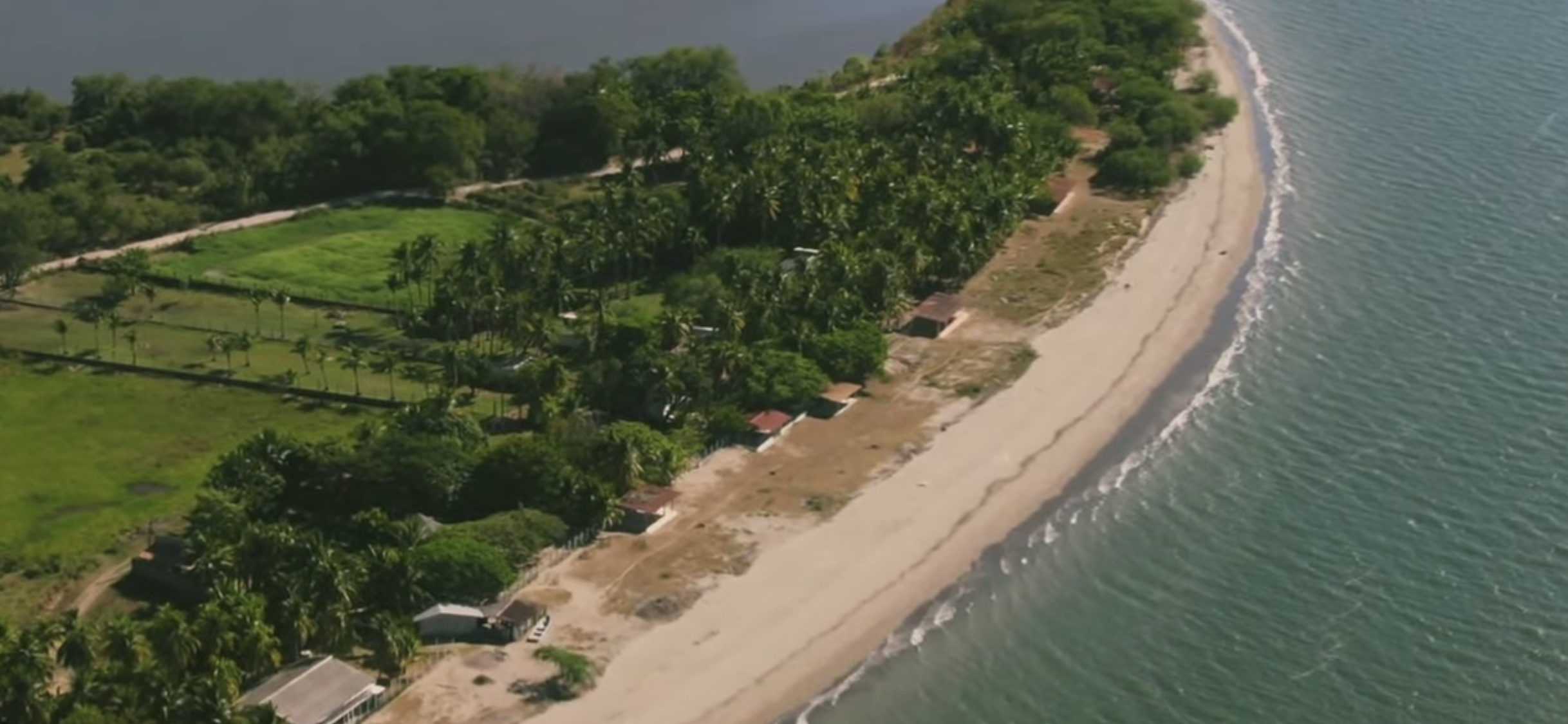
Aerial view of Punta Ratón Beach

Mangrove

== Economy ==
Punta Ratón is a small village, mostly dependent on the capture and sale of shrimp and local species of fish, such as red snapper. Employment is also derived from the nearby agriculture and aquaculture industries, as well as small-scale tourism. Additionally, it contains a small number of private residences and vacation homes.
