= Lufussa =

Honduran energy company

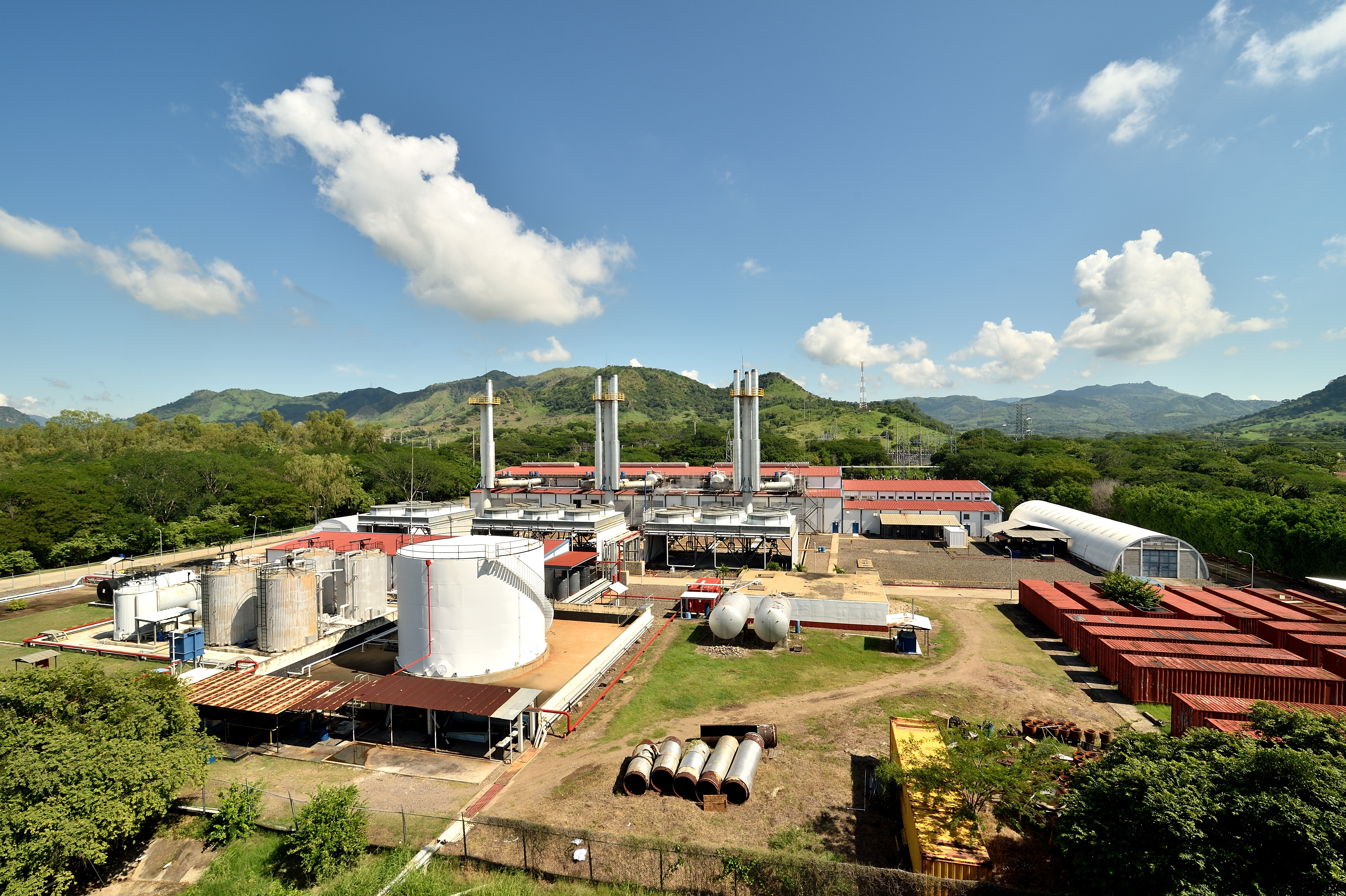
- The Pavana II power plant, second of the three Lufussa power plants.
- Industry: Electric Utilities
- Founded: 1994
- Headquarters: Honduras
- Area served: Honduras
- Key people: Luis Kafie (Founder)
- Products: Electricity generation, transmission and distribution
- Website: lufussa.com (English homepage)

Luz y Fuerza de San Lorenzo Sociedad Anónima (English: San Lorenzo Light and Power Company; commonly known as Lufussa) is a Honduran energy company created in 1994, shortly after the country allowed the development of privately owned power plants. Founded by brothers Schucry Kafie, Luis Kafie, and Eduardo Kafie, it is one of a small number of substantial energy providers in the country, with an installed capacity of 390 MW from three main power plants.

== History ==
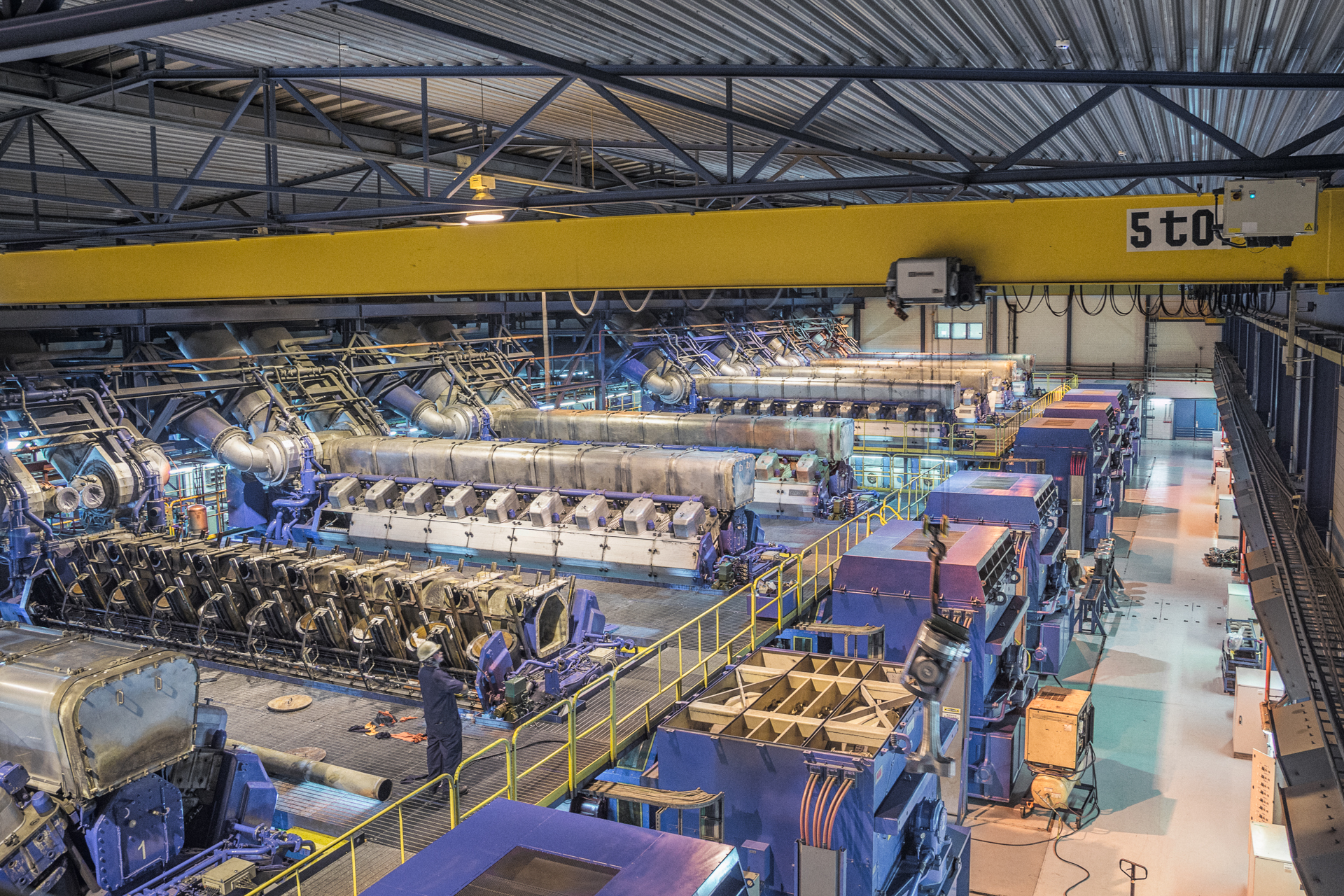
Interior view of Lufussa owned Pavana II power plant.

In 1993, during the government of Rafael Leonardo Callejas, Honduras made it possible for private enterprises to provide thermal energy to the country. In 1994, Lufussa was established as a power company, and Carlos Roberto Reina approved a 10-year contract and Lufussa. In 1997, Lufussa was one of three firms out of thirteen prequalified competitors to bid on a 60-megawatt government contract, ultimately splitting the contract with another Honduran energy company, EMCE. New contracts awarded via public tender were signed under the administrations of Carlos Flores and Ricardo Maduro. In March 2014, Lufussa negotiated an agreement with the Honduran government to provide 30 megawatts of power to the country for the next two years, with production from the power plants involved being exclusive to Honduras.

In October 2015, an International Conclave organized by the Colegio de Ingenieros Mecanicos, Elétricos y Químicos de Honduras visited regional Lufussa power plants to examine thermoelectric power technology in Honduras. As of June 2017, Lufussa claims an installed capacity of 390 MW, in three plants - Pavana I (39.5 MW, completed 1995), II (82 MW, completed 1999), and III (267.4 MW, completed August 2004). Pavana III represents the largest private investment in the country.

== Charitable activities ==
=== Environmental protection ===
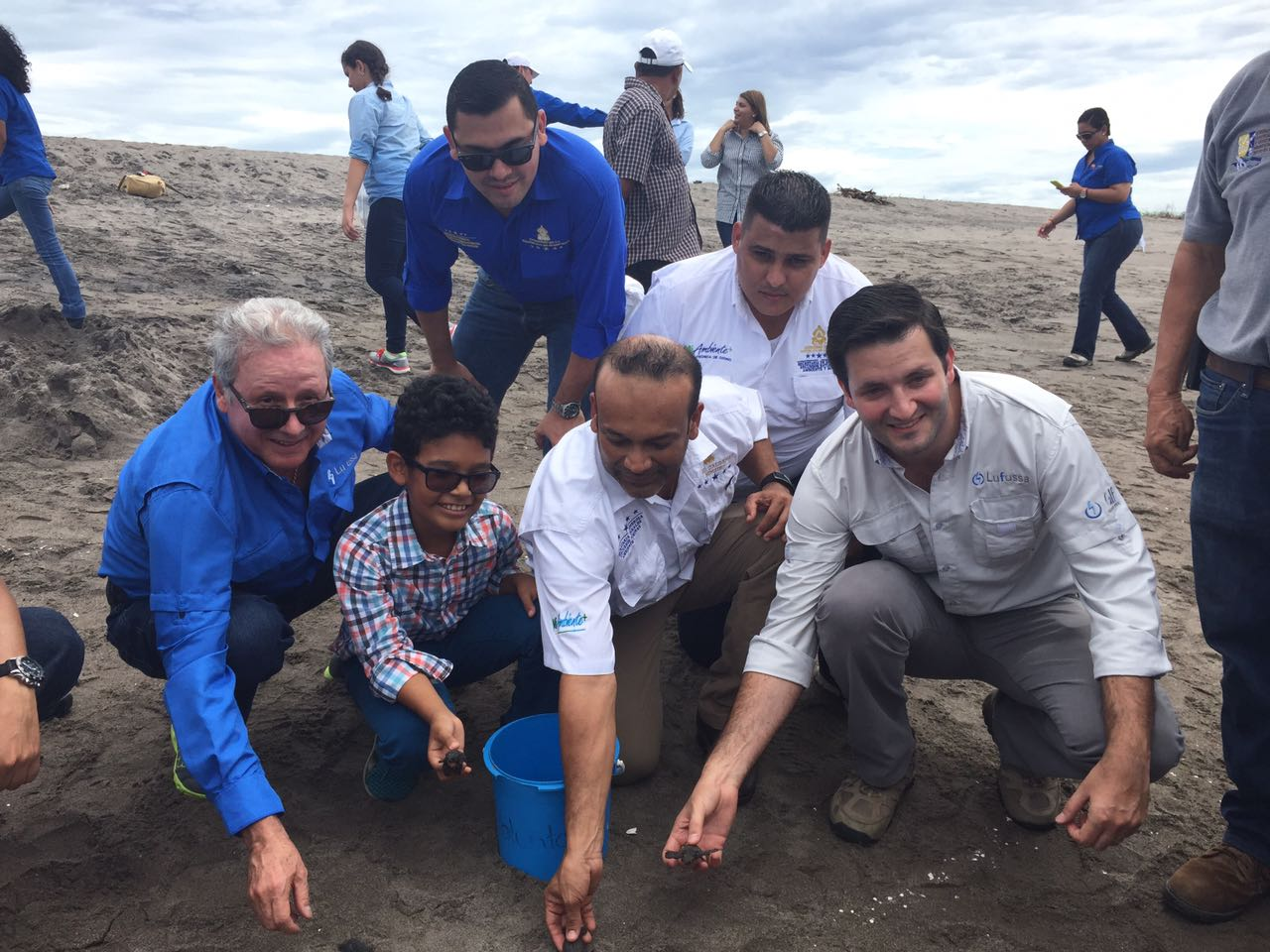
Lufussa founder Luis Kafie and Christopher Kafie among environmental government members in Punta Condenga, turtle liberation.

Lufussa supports a variety of charitable activities in Honduras. In terms of environmental protection, Lufussa is involved in the Honduran national reforestation program, and sea turtle conservation in the Gulf of Fonseca.

In 2016, Lufussa delivered 200,000 trees to the Honduran government as part of the reforestation program. In June 2017, Lufussa entered into an agreement with the Mayor of El Picacho to deliver a new municipal nursery to the city, with the necessary resources to produce an additional 112,000 trees per year for reforestation in the district. With respect to sea turtle preservation, Lufussa has supported this effort since 2011, and in 2016 the company delivered 675 meals to volunteers securing sea turtle eggs at camps in Punta Ratón, Boca de Rio Viejo, Cedeño and Carretales.

=== Community development ===
In support of the Honduran community, Lufussa supports construction efforts in cooperation with the non-governmental organization Honduras Outreach Inc. (HOI), and a medical brigade to serve low-income people in northern Honduras, also including the Choluteca region. In 2016, Lufussa's volunteer force and HOI brigaders built 2 latrines and 3 bathrooms, installed concrete floors in 7 houses, and installed 2 eco-stoves in the communities of Guanacastillo, El Tambor and Aguacaliente, in the south of the country. They also provided more than 50 complete sets of bedding to the Regional Hospital del Sur. Since 2011, Lufussa has also carried out "Healthy Homes" Program in the communities of El Tambor, Guanacastillo, Pavana Center and Aguacaliente, remodeling 167 homes by changing earth floors to finely finished cement, thereby reducing incidences of disease. The medical brigade, with the participation of 29 American doctors acting in coordination with Lufussa volunteers, has treated hundreds of people in Pavana Centro and Guanacastillo. Since December 2014, Lufussa has organized an annual city marathon in Choluteca, Honduras, with the objective of raising funds for charitable causes in the area. In 2014, 150 thousand lempiras were raised for the Hospital del Sur, and in 2015 a donation of 175 thousand lempiras was made to the "Enrique Elizalde" School for the Blind.
