= Electricity sector in Nicaragua =

Electricity sector of Nicaragua
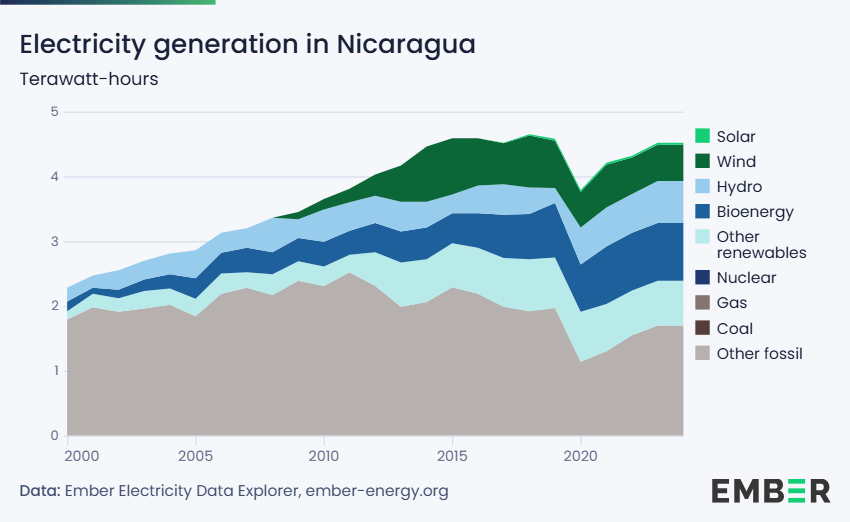

Data
- Electricity coverage (2022): 86.5% (total), 66.3% (rural), 100% (urban)
- Installed capacity (2023): 1849 MW
- Share of fossil energy: 35.5%
- Share of renewable energy: 30.6% (hydro & geothermal)
- GHG emissions from electricity generation (2023): 3.806 MtCO_{2}
- Average electricity use (2023): 4.654 kWh per capita
- Distribution losses (2023): 18.03%; (LAC average in 2005: 13.6%)

Consumption by sector (% of total)
- Residential: 43%
- Industrial: 12.5%
- Commercial: 11.4%

Tariffs and financing
- Average residential tariff (US$/kW·h, 2006): 0.137; (LAC average in 2005: 0.115)
- Average industrial tariff (US$/kW·h, 2006): 0.101; (LAC average in 2005: 0.107)
- Average commercial tariff (US$/kW·h, 2006): 0.137

Services
- Sector unbundling: Yes
- Share of private sector in generation: 70%
- Competitive supply to large users: No
- Competitive supply to residential users: No

Institutions
- No. of service providers: 10 (generation), 1 (transmission), 1 main (distribution)
- Responsibility for regulation: INE-Nicaraguan Energy Institute
- Responsibility for policy-setting: MEM-Ministry of Energy and Mines
- Responsibility for the environment: Environment and Natural Resources Ministry (MARENA)
- Electricity sector law: Yes (1998, modified in 1997)
- Renewable energy law: Yes (2005)
- CDM transactions related to the electricity sector: 2 registered CDM project; 336,723 t CO_{2}e annual emissions reductions

Nicaragua has the 2nd lowest electricity generation in Central America, ahead only of Belize. Nicaragua also possesses the lowest percentage of population with access to electricity. The unbundling and privatization process of the 1990s did not achieve the expected objectives, resulting in very little generation capacity added to the system. This, together with its high dependence on oil for electricity generation (the highest in the region), led to an energy crisis in 2006 from which the country struggled to recover from.

The recent figures are available at: https://web.archive.org/web/20130726102527/http://ine.gob.ni/DGE/serieHistorica.html

The Nicaraguan electricity system comprises the National Interconnected System (SIN), which covers more than 90% of the territory where the population of the country lives (the entire Pacific, Central and North zone of the country). The remaining regions are covered by small isolated generation systems. The Central American Electrical Interconnection System (SIEPAC) project will integrate the electricity network of the country with the rest of the Central American countries, which is expected to improve reliability of supply and reduce costs.

== Electricity supply and demand ==
=== Installed capacity ===
Nicaragua continues significantly dependent on oil for electricity generation, despite recent developments toward renewable energy sources following the COVID-19 pandemic, with approximately 36% of energy production remaining reliant on oil. As of 2022, Nicaragua had an installed generating capacity of 1849 MW, with the following breakdown by sources of electricity:

Source	Generation (%)
Oil	35.5
Hydroelectric	14.9
Biofuels	20.4
Wind	12.8
Solar	0.6
Geothermal	15.7

Gross electricity generation was 3,140 GWh, of which 69% came from traditional thermal sources, 10% from bagasse thermal plants, 10% from hydroelectricity, and 10% from geothermal sources. The remaining 1% corresponds to the electricity generated in the "isolated" systems. The detailed breakdown of generation among the different sources is as follows:

Source	Generation (GWh)	Generation (%)
Hydroelectric (public)	307	9.8%
Thermal (public) – fuel oil	199	6.3%
Thermal (private) – fuel oil	1,883	60%
Thermal (private) – bagasse	323	10.3%
Gas turbines (public) – diesel	71	2.3%
Gas turbines (private) – diesel	0.82	0.02%
Geothermal	311	9.9%
Isolated systems	42	1.3%

Source: INE Statistics

Although nominal installed capacity has increased by 113 MW since 2001, effective capacity has only increased by 53 MW, remaining as low as 589 MW in 2006. The large difference between nominal and effective capacity is due to the existence of old thermal plants that do not operate properly and that should be either refurbished or replaced.

=== Demand ===
In 2006, total electricity sold in Nicaragua increased 5.5%, up to 2,052 GWh, which corresponds to 366kWh annual per capita consumption. The consumption share for the different economic sectors was as follows:

- Residential: 34%
- Commercial: 31%
- Industrial: 20%
- Other: 15%

=== Demand versus supply ===
Maximum demand has increased in Nicaragua at an annual rate of about 4% since 2001, which has led to a low reserve margin (6% in 2006). Furthermore, demand is expected to increase by 6% per year for the next 10 years, which increases the need for new generation capacity.

== Access to electricity ==
In 2001, only 47% of the population in Nicaragua had access to electricity. The electrification programs developed by the former National Electricity Commission (CNE) with resources from the National Fund for the Development of the Electricity Industry (FODIEN), the Inter-American Development Bank, the World Bank and the Swiss Fund for Rural Electrification (FCOSER), have led to an increase in electricity access to 55% (68% according to the Census estimates, which also consider illegal connections) by 2006. However, this coverage is still among the lowest in the region and well below the 94.6 average for Latin America and the Caribbean (LAC) Coverage in the rural areas is below 40%, while in urban areas it reaches 92%.

In 2004, the National Energy Commission (CNE) developed the National Plan for Rural Electrification (PLANER), which established goals and investment figures for the period 2004–2013. Its objective is to bring power to 90% of the country's rural areas by the end of 2012. The Rural Electrification Policy was approved in September 2006 as the main guide for implementation of the PLANER.

== Service quality ==
=== Interruption frequency and duration ===
In 2003, the average number of interruptions per subscriber was 4 (weighted average for LAC in 2005 was 13), while duration of interruptions per subscriber was 25 hours (weighted average for LAC in 2005 was 14). However, the situation worsened during the energy crisis in 2006, when large sections of the country suffered continuous and lengthy blackouts (See Recent developments below).

=== Distribution losses ===
In 2006, distribution losses in Nicaragua were 28.8%, the highest in Central America together with Honduras, whose average was 16.2%. This is one of the most acute problems faced by the sector in Nicaragua, as it leads to very large economic losses. This problem is partially caused by the widespread existence of illegal connections, altered metering systems and low bill collection capacity in certain areas.

== Responsibilities in the electricity sector ==
=== Policy and regulation ===
The regulatory entities for the electricity sector in Nicaragua are:

- The Ministry of Energy and Mines (MEM), created in January 2007, replaced the National Energy Commission (CNE). The MEM is in charge of producing the development strategies for the national electricity sector. In 2003, the CNE elaborated the "Indicative plan for the generation in the electricity sector in Nicaragua, 2003-2014", which aims to provide useful insight for private investors to orient their decisions on technologies to implement in the country.
- The Nicaraguan Energy Institute (INE) applies the policies defined by the government (i.e. by MEM). It is in charge of regulation and taxation.
- The Regional Commission for Electric Interconnection (CRIE) is the regulatory body for the Regional Electricity Market (MER) created by the 1996 Framework Treaty for the Electricity Market in Central America.

The National Dispatch Center (CNDC) is the operational body in charge of administering the Wholesale Electricity Market (MEN)and the National Interconnected System (SIN).

=== Generation ===
In 2006, there were 10 generation companies in the National Interconnected System, eight of which were in private hands. The number and type of plants operated by each company was as follows:

Type	Company name	No. of plants	Installed capacity (MW)
Public		4	226.8
Hydroelectric	Hidrogesa	2	104.4
Thermal	GECSA	2	122.4
Private		9	524.4
Geothermal	Gemosa	1	77.5
	SJP	1	10
Thermal	CENSA	1	63.9
	EEC	1	47
	GEOSA	2	120
	Monte Rosa	1	67.5
	NSEL	1	59.3
	Tipitapa	1	52.2
TOTAL		13	751.2

Source: CEPAL 2007

=== Transmission ===
In Nicaragua, 100% of the transmission is handled by ENATREL, which is also in charge of the system's dispatch.

=== Distribution ===
In Nicaragua, the company Dissur-Disnorte, owned by the Spanish Unión Fenosa, controls 95% of the distribution. Other companies with minor contributions are Bluefields, Wiwilí and ATDER-BL.

== Renewable energy resources ==
The "Indicative plan for the generation in the electricity sector in Nicaragua, 2003-2014" does not set any target or legal obligation for the development of renewable resources in the country. However, in April 2005, the government approved Law No. 532., the "Law on Promotion of Electricity Generation with Renewable Resources". This law declared the development and exploitation of renewable resources to be in the national interest and established tax incentives for renewables.

=== Renewable energy advances ===
NPR reported in 2015 that Nicaragua was increasing its renewable energy capacity. The report said that renewables generated nearly half the country's electricity, and that this could rise to 80% in the near future.

=== Hydroelectricity ===
Currently, hydroelectric plants account only for 10% of the electricity produced in Nicaragua. The public company Hidrogesa owns and operates the two existing plants (Centroamérica and Santa Bárbara).

As a response to the recent (and still unresolved) energy crisis linked to Nicaragua's overdependence on oil products for the generation of electricity, there are plans for the construction of new hydroelectric plants. In 2006 the Central American Bank for Economic Integration (BCIE) and the Government reached an agreement by which the BCIE will provide US$120 million in the next five years (2007–2012) in order to finance several hydroelectric projects:

- Modernization of the Centroamérica and Santa Bárbara plants, which generate 50 MW each.
- US$37 million for the design, construction and initial operation of the 17 MW Larreynaga hydroelectric plant, to be located 161 km North of Managua, in the Department of Jinotega.
- US$42–45 million for the design, construction and initial operation of the 21 MW Sirena-Los Calpules hydroelectric plant.

In March 2008 the government of Iran approved a US$230 million credit for the construction of a 70 MW hydropower plant by the name of Bodoke on the Tuma River in the northern department of Jinotega. According to press reports the project will be carried out by a state-owned Iranian company with financing from the Iranian Export Bank under an agreement with the Nicaraguan Ministry of Energy and Mines. Micro hydropower also continues to be a popular sustainable energy resource, particularly in isolated rural regions of Nicaragua which are currently not electrified .

The Tumarín Dam, a gravity dam, is currently under construction on the Río Grande de Matagalpa just upstream of the town of Tumarín in the South Caribbean Coast Autonomous Region, Nicaragua. It is located about 35 km (22 mi) east of San Pedro del Norte, where the Río Grande de Matagalpa meets the Tuma River. Preliminary construction (roads, bridges and foundation) began in 2011 and main works are expected to begin in February 2015. Completion is scheduled for 2019. Brazil's Eletrobras will fund the US$1.1 billion under a 20 to 30 year build–operate–transfer (BOT) agreement. The project is being developed by Centrales Hidroelectricas de Nicaragua (CHN). The power station located at the base of the dam will house three 84.33 MW Kaplan turbine-generators for an installed capacity of 253 MW.

=== Wind ===
Nicaragua's wind potential is still largely unexploited. However, steps are being taken, partially thanks to the new framework created by Law No.532.

In February 2009, the Wind Consortium Amayo successfully connected its new 40 MW Wind Park to the SIN making it the country"s first operational wind park. During late 2009 - early 2010 the Amayo wind farm was expanded with additional 23 MW, total capacity now amounting 60 MW. The windfarm comprises 30 turbines type S88 2.1 MW, from Suzlon Wind Energy, India.

Amayo is currently the largest operating wind facility in Central America.

=== Geothermal ===
Nicaragua is a country endowed with large geothermal potential thanks to the presence of volcanoes of the Marribios range along the Pacific Coast. However, the country is still very far from exploiting this natural resource extensively and efficiently. Law No. 443 regulates the exploration and exploitation of geothermal resources.

The larger of two operating geothermal plants is the Momotombo geothermal project, whose commercial exploitation started in 1983, when the first geothermal unit of 35 MW was put in operation. The second unit of 35 MW was installed in 1989. However, mismanagement of the exploitation led to declines in output levels down to 10 MW. It is expected that with the implementation of a reinjection program and the exploitation of a deeper reservoir, production will increase from the current 20 MW to 75 MW.

Ram Power, previously Polaris Geothermal, currently operates the 10 MW San Jacinto Tizate geothermal plant, a registered Clean Development Mechanism (CDM) project (see CDM projects in electricity below), with two phases of expansion underway, the first to start operations in the autumn of 2010. The second phase was scheduled to be in operation by December 2012.

=== Biomass ===
Sugarcane bagasse feeds 10% of electricity generation in thermal plants in Nicaragua.

== History of the electricity sector and recent developments ==
=== Early history ===
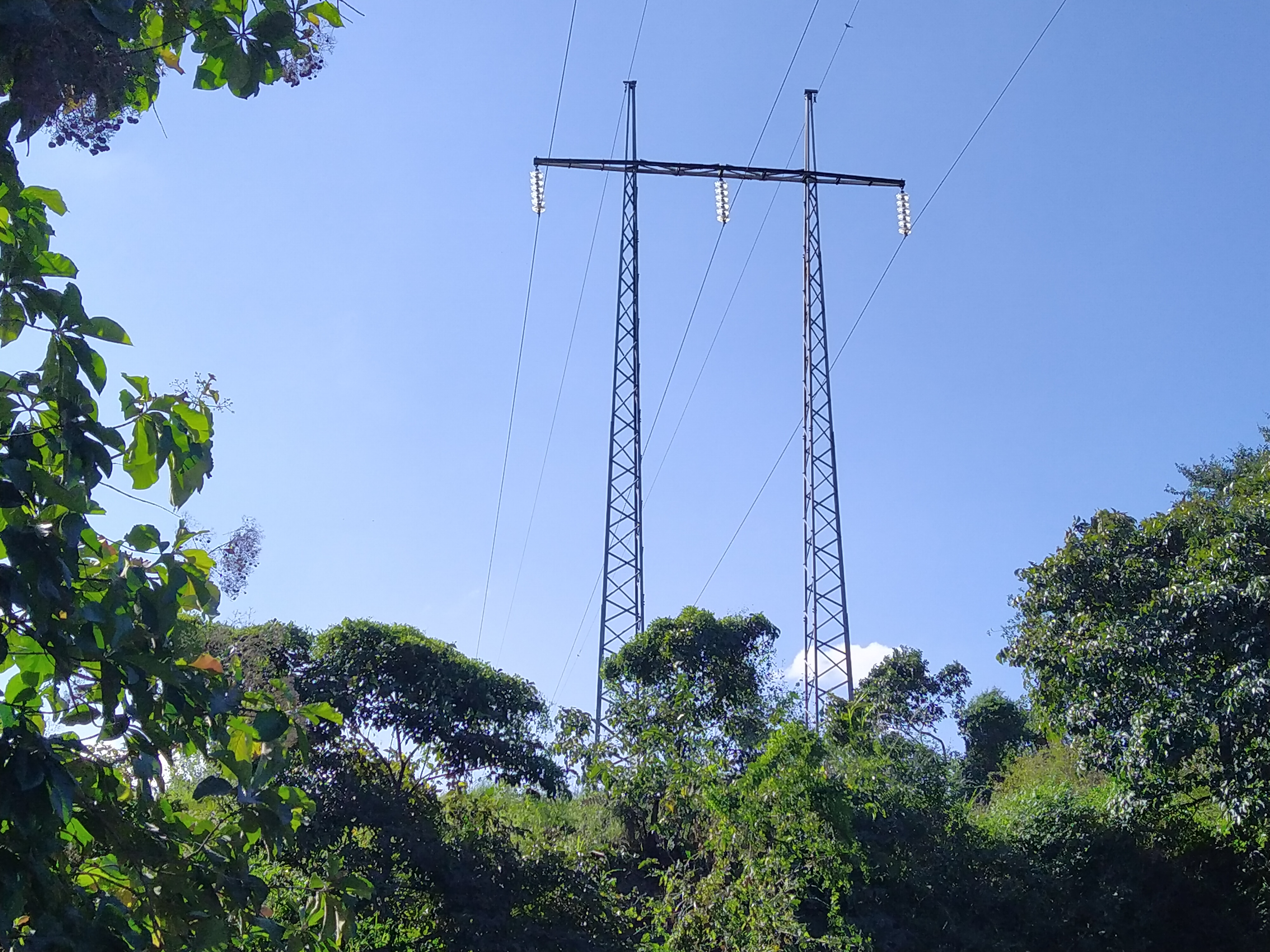
Suspension tower of a 69 kV power line from 1958

In 1959 a large thermal power plant opened in Managua. In 1971 it had a capacity of 75 MW. The creation of a national electric grid started in 1958 with the construction of two 69 kV power lines from Managua to Granada and from Managua to León and Chinandega.

=== Integrated state monopoly (1979-1992) ===
Until the early 1990s, the electricity sector in Nicaragua was characterized by the presence of the State, through the Nicaraguan Energy Institute (INE), in all its activities. Created in 1979, INE had Ministry status and was a vertically integrated state monopoly responsible for planning, regulation, policy making, development and operation of the country's energy resources. During that decade, the sector faced serious financial and operational problems as a result of the currency devaluation, war, a trade embargo imposed by the United States and the lack of resources for investment in operation and maintenance of the electricity system.

=== Sector reforms (1992–2002) ===
At the beginning of the 1990s, the government of President Violeta Chamorro started the reform of the electricity sector aiming to ensure efficient demand coverage, to promote economic efficiency and to attract resources for infrastructure expansion. In 1992, INE was allowed, by law, to negotiate contracts and concessions with private investors. The Nicaraguan Electricity Company (ENEL) was created in 1994 as the state company in charge of electricity generation, transmission, distribution, commercialization and coordination of the operations previously assigned to INE. INE kept its planning, policy making, regulatory, and taxation functions.

The reform process was consolidated in 1998 with Law 272 (Electricity Industry Law - LIE) and Law 271 (INE Reform Law). The reform of the INE led to the creation of the National Energy Commission (CNE), which assumed the policy making and planning responsibilities. Law 272 established the basic principles for the operation of a competitive wholesale market with the participation of private companies. Electricity generation, transmission and distribution were unbundled and companies were prohibited to have interests in more than one of the three activities. ENEL was restructured in four generation companies (Hidrogesa, GEOSA, GECSA and GEMOSA); two distribution companies (DISNORTE and DISSUR), both acquired by Unión Fenosa and then merged into a single company; and one transmission company (ENTRESA, now ENATREL).

The privatization process that started in 2000 with a public offering of the four generation companies was complicated due both to legal problems and to lack of interest by investors. As a result, ENEL maintained a more relevant role than initially expected. Hidrogesa remained in public hands as the only player in hydroelectric generation while its profits serve to finance the losses of GECSA, which owns the thermal plants that did not attract private interest, and the rural electrification plans in isolated areas.

The reforms of the 1990s did not achieve their objectives. It had been expected that privatization would bring investment in new generation, but very little capacity was added in the years that followed the reform. Moreover, the generation capacity added in the last decade has been mainly dependent on liquid fuels, making the country more vulnerable to rising oil prices. In addition, as mentioned, distribution losses have remained at very high levels (28%). The reform also aimed at implementing gradual changes in electricity tariffs that would reflect costs, which proved to be politically unfeasible.

=== Oil price increase, financial stress and blackouts (2002–2006) ===
When oil prices increased from 2002 onwards, the regulator failed to approve electricity tariff increases, because they were expected to have been very unpopular. The financial burden of the higher generation costs was thus passed on to the privatized distribution company, which has, partly as a result, been suffering severe losses.

In 2006, the electricity sector in Nicaragua suffered a serious crisis, with 4- to 12-hour blackouts that affected virtually the whole country. The distribution company owned by Unión Fenosa, was blamed and the concession was temporarily cancelled by the government, which called for arbitration. This led Union Fenosa to call its Multilateral Investment Guarantee Agency (MIGA) guarantee. The crisis was further aggravated by the inability of INE and CNE to cooperate in a constructive manner. The emergency situation improved in 2007 due to the installation of 60 MW of diesel generation capacity financed by Venezuela.

=== Creation of the Ministry of Energy (2007) ===
In January 2007, shortly after President Daniel Ortega took office, a new law created the Ministry of Energy and Mines (MEM), which replaced the CNE. The new Ministry inherited CNE's responsibilities together with some additional competencies from the INE. Also, in August 2007, an agreement was reached between Unión Fenosa and Nicaragua's new government. The government committed to pass a law to combat fraud, which will help reduce distribution losses and Unión Fenosa will develop an investment plan for the period up to 2012.

=== Regional integration, the SIEPAC project ===
In 1995, after almost a decade of preliminary studies, the Central American governments, the government of Spain and the Inter-American Development Bank agreed to the execution of the SIEPAC project. This project aims at the electric integration of the region. Feasibility studies showed that the creation of a regional transmission system would be very positive for the region and lead to a reduction in electricity costs and to improvements in the continuity and reliability of supply. In 1996, the six countries (Panama, Honduras, Guatemala, Costa Rica, Nicaragua and El Salvador) signed the Framework Treaty for the Electricity Market in Central America.

The design of the Regional Electricity Market (MER) was done in 1997 and approved in 2000. MER is an additional market superimposed on the existing six national markets, with a regional regulation, in which the agents authorized by the Regional Operational Body (EOR) carry out international electricity transactions in the region. As for the infrastructure, EPR (Empresa Propietaria de la Red S.A.) is in charge of the design, engineering, and construction of about 1,800 km of 230kV transmission lines. The project is expected to be operational by the end of 2011.

(For a map of the regional transmission line, see SIEPAC)

== Tariffs and subsidies ==
=== Tariffs ===
Electricity tariffs in Nicaragua had increased only slightly between 1998 and 2005 (in fact, industrial tariffs decrease in that period). However, in 2006 electricity tariffs experienced a high increase relative to 2005: 12% for residential, 26% for commercial and 23% for industrial tariffs. Average tariffs for each of the sectors were:

- Residential: US$0.137 per kWh (LAC weighted average: US$0.115)
- Commercial: US$0.187 per kWh
- Industrial: US$0.101 per kWh (LAC weighted average: US$0.107)

These tariffs are not low; they are in fact among the highest in the Central American region. Residential prices are close to the regional average while industrial prices are the highest in the region.

=== Subsidies ===
Currently, there are cross-subsidies in the tariff structure. Medium voltage consumers pay higher tariffs that serve to subsidize lower tariffs for low voltage consumers. Users that consume less than 150 kWh per month receive transfers from the rest of the consumers. The lowest-consumption users (0-50kWh/month) benefit from reductions between 45% and 63% in their average tariff. Consumers above the 50kWh limit also benefit from the subsidy scheme to a smaller extent.

== Investment and financing ==
=== Generation ===
In 2007, new “emergency” generation (60 MW) has been financed by the Venezuelan government. On the other hand, the new hydroelectric projects will receive both public and private financing, while the ongoing Amayo wind development and the new San Jacinto Tizate geothermal plant are privately funded.

=== Transmission ===
Entresa has elaborated a plan for transmission infrastructure expansion for the period 2007-2016. However, financing has not been ensured for all the projects yet.

=== Distribution ===
In August 2007, Unión Fenosa committed to elaborate an investment plan for the period up to 2012.

=== Rural electrification ===
Financing sources for rural electrification are limited. The National Fund for the Development of the Electricity Industry (FODIEN) receives its resources from the concessions and licenses granted by the Nicaraguan Energy Institute (INE). However, funds have been insufficient. The World Bank (through the PERZA project) and the Swiss government (through FCOSER) have also contributed funds and assistance to advance the objectives of rural electrification in the country.

== Summary of private participation in the electricity sector ==
Electricity generation, transmission and distribution, previously in the hands of state-owned ENEL, were unbundled in 1998. Today, there are 10 generation companies in the National Interconnected system, 8 of which are in private hands. 100% of the hydroelectric capacity is in the hands of the public company Hidrogesa. As for transmission, it is handled solely by state-owned ENATREL, while distribution is 95% controlled by Spanish Unión Fenosa.

Activity	Private participation (%)
Generation	70% of installed capacity
Transmission	0%
Distribution	100%

== Electricity and the environment ==
=== Responsibility for the environment ===
The Ministry of Environment and Natural Resources (MARENA) is the institution in charge of the conservation, protection and sustainable use of the natural resources and the environment.

The National Climate Change Commission was created in 1999.

=== Greenhouse gas emissions ===
OLADE (Latin American Energy Association) estimated that CO_{2} emissions from electricity production in 2003 were 1.52 million tons of CO_{2}, which corresponds to 39% of total emissions from the energy sector. This high contribution to emissions from electricity production in comparison with other countries in the region is due to the high share of thermal generation.

=== CDM projects in electricity ===
Currently (November 2007), there are only two registered CDM projects in the electricity sector in Nicaragua, with overall estimated emission reductions of 336,723 tCO_{2}e per year. One of them is the San Jacinto Tizate geothermal project and the other one is the Monte Rosa Bagasse Cogeneration Project

== External assistance ==
=== Inter-American Development Bank ===
The Inter-American Development Bank (IDB) has several projects under implementation in the electricity sector in Nicaragua:

- In October 2007, the IDB approved US$350,500 for the Support to Power Sector Investment Program.
- In June 2007, a US$12 million loan was approved for the National Transmission Strengthening for Integration SIEPAC project. The objective of this project is to ensure that the Nicaraguan transmission system is adapted for the interconnection with the SIEPAC line. It is necessary to ensure that energy can then be commercialized according to the safety and reliability criteria established by the Regional Electricity System, avoiding service interruptions both at the national and regional levels.
- In June 2006, the IDB also approved a technical cooperation activity for Energy Efficiency Development in Nicaragua. The objective of this program is to assist the Government in the design, evaluation and implementation of energy efficiency measures, including the implementation of pilot projects, identification of the information needs and preparation of the loan proposals for implementation of additional energy efficiency measures.
- In December 2005, two wind-related technical cooperation activities were approved, one for the Development of Wind Power Generation in Isolated Systems and another one for a Wind Power Park Feasibility Study in Corn Island.

=== World Bank ===
The World Bank has currently one Off-grid Rural Electrification (PERZA) project under implementation in Nicaragua. The US$19 million project will receive US$12 million funding from the Bank in the period 2003–2008. The main objective of the project is to support the sustainable provision of electricity services and associated social and economic benefits in selected rural sites in Nicaragua, and strengthen the Government's institutional capacity to implement its national rural electrification strategy.

=== Other ===
Several countries have provided financial support for the expansion of the transmission network in Nicaragua:

- Germany: The German bank KfW has provided financing to several transmission projects in recent years. One of those projects, the construction of the electrical substation Las Colinas and its associated transmission line is to be finalized in December 2007.
- Korea: Korea's Eximbank has also provided funds in recent years for the expansion of the transmission system with several electrical substations: Ticuantepe, León I, El Viejo, Nandaime, Boaco and Las Banderas, which have entered into operation between January 2006 and December 2007.
- Spain: The Spanish Official Credit Institute (ICO) and the Fund for Development Assistance (FAD) have provided funds for the construction of the electrical substation of Ticuantepe and the supply of materials for the transmission system in the period 2003–2008.

== Sources ==
- CEPAL, 2007. Istmo Centroamericano: Estadísticas del Subsector Eléctrico
- Inter-American Development Bank, 2004 Nicaragua: Opciones de Política para la Reforma del Sector Eléctrico

== See also ==
- Economy of Nicaragua
- Water supply and sanitation in Nicaragua
