= Wawa River =

Wawa River refers to:

- Wawa River (Nicaragua), a river in the North Caribbean Coast Autonomous Region of Nicaragua
- Wawa River (Agusan del Sur), a tributary of the Agusan River in the southern Philippines
- Wawa River, a tributary of the Marikina River, in the Rizal province of the Philippines
