= Battle of La Flor =

- Part of the Occupation of Nicaragua, Banana Wars
- Battle of La Flor (Nicaragua)
| Date | 13–14 May 1928 |
| Location | La Flor, Nicaragua 13°24′49.8″N 85°42′39.75″W |
| Result | Sandinistan victory |

Belligerents
| United States; Nicaragua | Sandinistas |

Commanders and leaders
| (United States) Cap. Robert S. Hunter † (United States) Lt. Earl S. Piper | Unknown |

Strength
| 40 marines & national guard | 75 guerrillas |

Casualties and losses
| 2 killed 1 wounded | 5 killed |

The Battle of La Flor was fought in May 1928 between the United States Marines, their Nicaraguan National Guardsmen allies, and a force of Sandinista rebels. It occurred at a hill north of the La Flor coffee plantation and ended with a rebel victory when the Americans and Nicaraguan National Guard troops were forced to withdraw.

== Battle ==
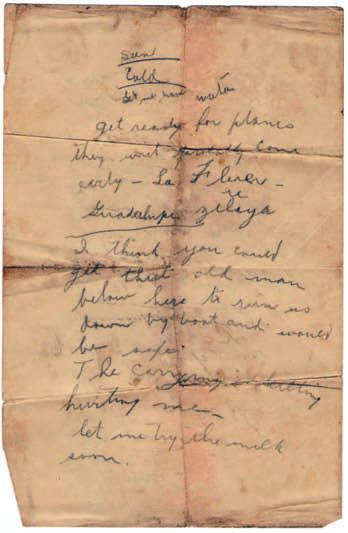
Some of Captain Hunter's notes, written during the battle.

As part of the Coco River Campaign, United States Marine Corps Captain Robert S. Hunter was in command of a patrol along the Cua River. Besides the captain, there were thirty-eight Marines and guardsmen as well as United States Navy Corpsman Oliver L. Young. The men came from the garrisons of Quilalí, Matagalpa and Corinto plantation. On the 13 May, at about 3:40 pm, Captain Hunter was leading his men through a ravine when they were attacked by an advance guard of rebels positioned on a hill next to the Bocaycito River which links up with the El Cua River.

The ambush was eventually beaten off so the Marines and Guardsmen continued on to the hill where the enemy fire had come from. The Sandinistas then launched another attack, numbering at least seventy-five guerrillas, and in the fight Corporal William R. Williamson was hit with a bullet and killed. The corporal was carrying a Thompson submachine gun so Captain Hunter moved forward to retrieve it in order to open fire on the attackers.

After picking up the weapon and returning fire, Hunter was struck in the neck by a bullet, and then once again in the shoulder. The captain could barely speak at this point so he wrote notes and instructions to his men on paper while the corpsman tried to tend to Hunter's wounds and that of a Marine private.

The battle continued for about fifty minutes before the rebels retreated to take up positions along the trail leading back south. At that point, the Marines and Guardsmen captured the hill and began fortifying the position in case of another attack. However, all remained quiet and there was no more fighting that day. On 14 May, Second Lieutenant Earl S. Piper assumed command and chose to retreat in order to evacuate the wounded. Since the Sandinistas occupied areas along the trail, the only way to escape was by breaking through enemy lines to the south, back towards La Flor and Quilalí. Lieutenant Piper sent a reconnaissance patrol out and, when they returned without making contact with the rebels, Piper began his retreat.

However, the Marines and Guardsmen had not made it very far down the hill when they were attacked again. Another forty-five-minute battle was fought, during which the wounded Captain Hunter attempted to rejoin the fight before being put back on his stretcher. Expert firing from the patrol's machine guns and hand grenades thrown by Sergeant Gerald R. Brown successfully forced the rebels to retreat again, leaving the trail to La Flor open. By 10:30 am, a Marine reconnaissance aircraft located the battlefield, but the fighting was already over. Piper broke through enemy lines without sustaining additional casualties and arrived at La Flor Plantation the following morning.

== Aftermath ==
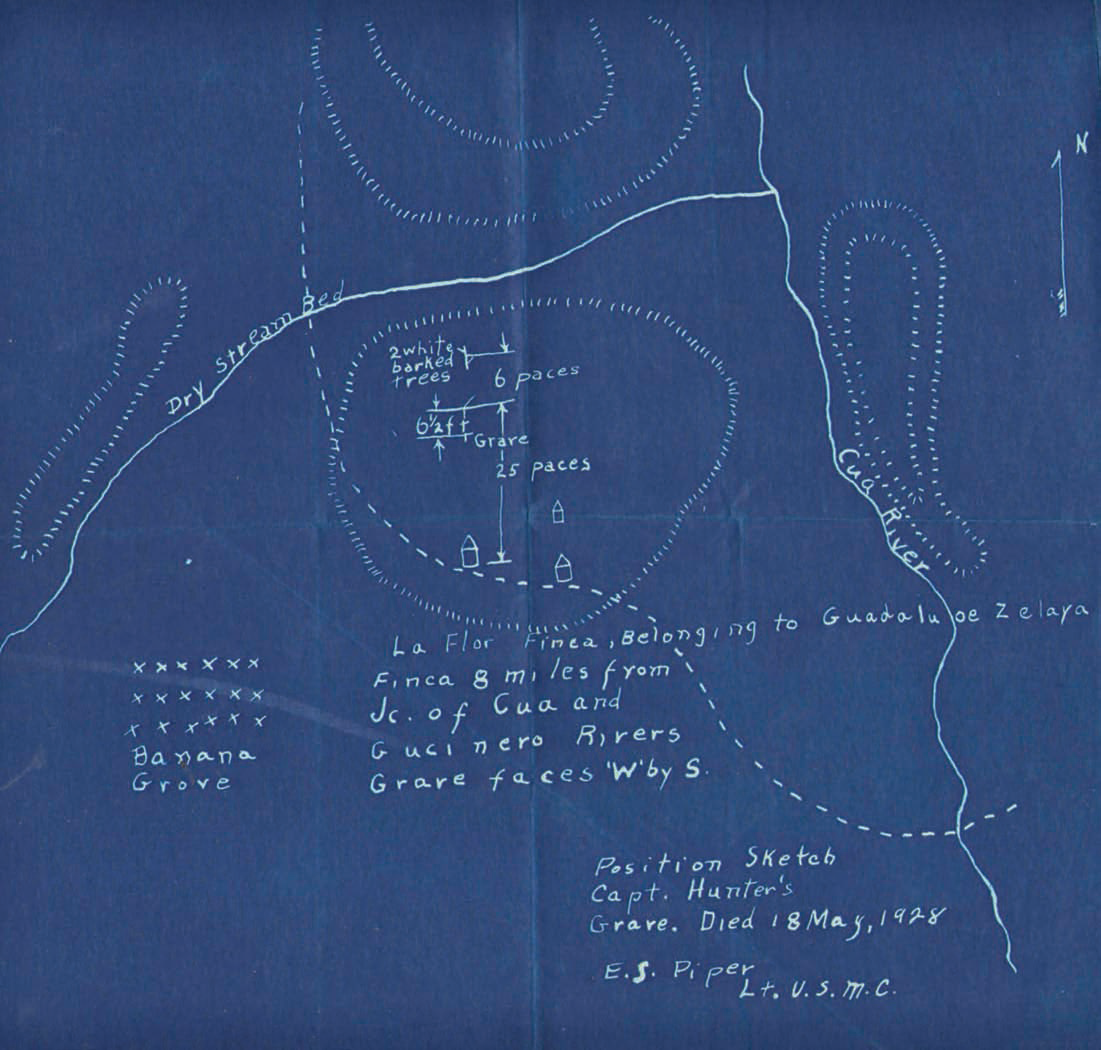
A map of the area showing the burial site for Captain Hunter killed in the battle.

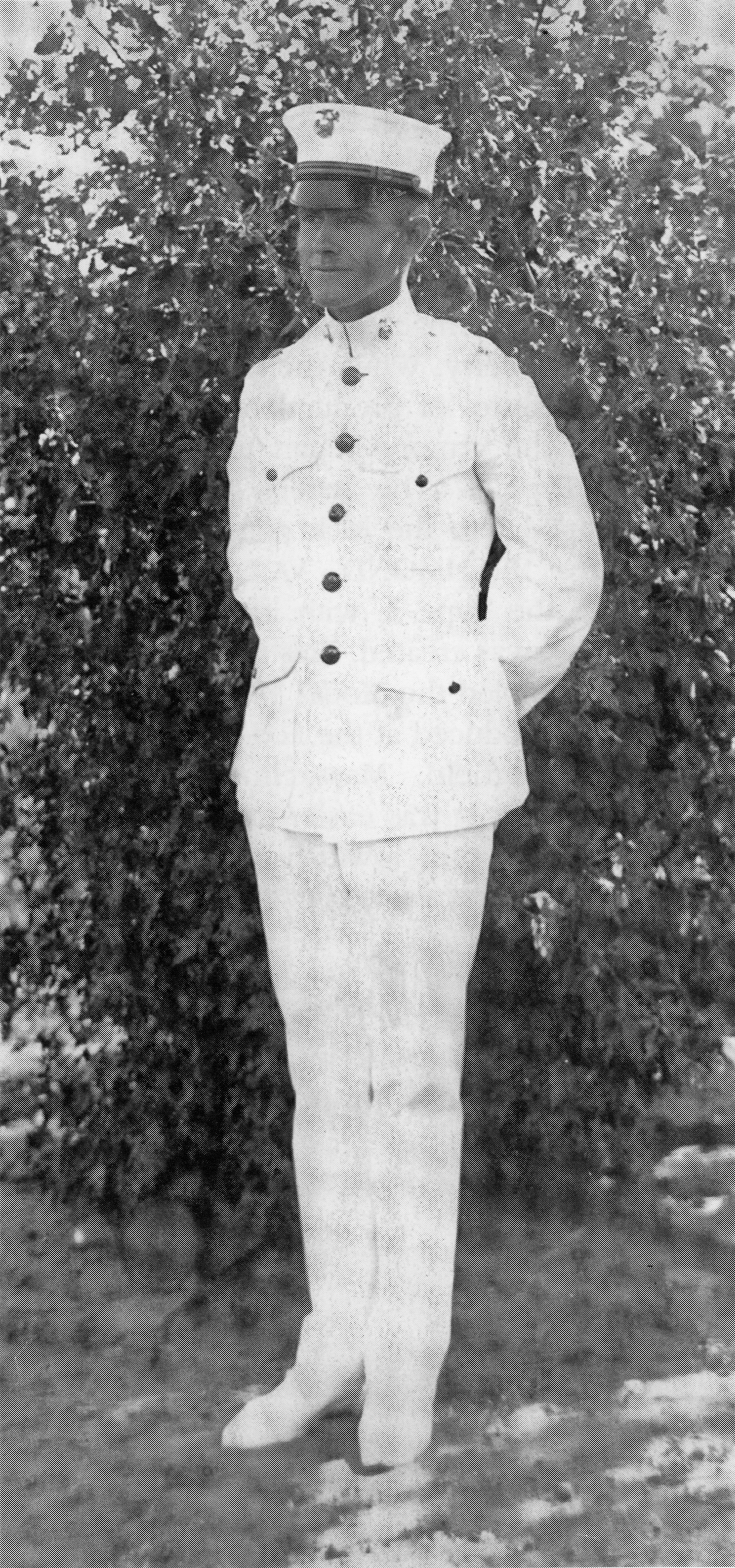
Captain Robert S. Hunter

Upon arriving at La Flor the Marines and the Guardsmen began fortifying the area, but were not attacked. Lieutenant Piper reported the following:

"Realizing that Captain Hunter could not be moved for several days and that we could not move without reinforcements we asked for same and also rations, when planes appeared at 1100 and when we found it was impossible to arrange a pick-up at this place."

On the 16 May, when the aircraft returned they confirmed that reinforcements were on their way and, on the 17 May, they dropped additional medical supplies. The pilots also suggested that Captain Hunter be evacuated via the Coco River, which Piper agreed was the best solution. Hunter was still regaining his strength so Piper decided to march for the river on 18 May, but the captain died of his wounds at 3:25 am on the same day and was buried at the plantation. The Battle of La Flor was one of the few victories of the Sandinistas during the American occupation, despite the fact that the Marines and Guardsmen defeated all of the rebel attacks. Captain Hunter would later receive the Navy Cross for his bravery in battle, as did Corpsman Young, who treated Hunter's wounds while under accurate enemy fire. Hunter's remains were later reburied in the United States in 1929. Casualties of the Marines and Guardsmen amounted to two dead, including Hunter, and one wounded, while the Sandinistas lost five killed. Second lieutenant Earl S. Piper was also decorated with the Navy Cross for his bravery in battle.

== See also ==
- Banana Wars
- Chesty Puller
