= List of rivers of Nicaragua =

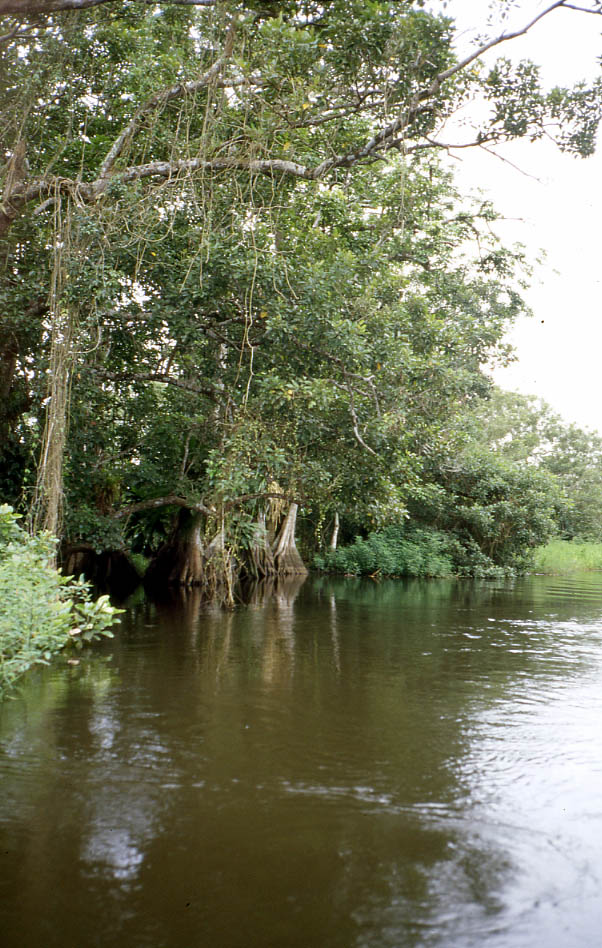
Los Guatuzos Wildlife Refuge, located south of Lake Cocibolca and borders the Río San Juan on the east.

The majority of rivers in Nicaragua are located on the Caribbean coast and empty out into the Caribbean Sea. The Río San Juan is one of the most important rivers in Nicaragua, it borders Costa Rica and connects the Caribbean Sea to Lake Cocibolca . The Nicaragua Canal was a proposed project for an inter-Oceanic canal to transport cargo ships coming in from the Pacific to the Caribbean, or vice versa, instead of sailing down around Cape Horn. As of 2007 the project is still being considered.

The Río Grande and its tributaries are the most extensive river system, while the Río Escondido provides a major transportation route between the Pacific and Caribbean coasts. The Río Coco, locally known as the Wanks, runs along the border with Honduras and is the longest river in Central America. Other important rivers include Río Tipitapa, which links Lake Cocibolca to Lake Managua and covers 1,050 km^{2} (405 sq mi).

== List of rivers in Nicaragua ==
- Río Amaka
- Río Carepicha
- Río Bambana
- Río Bocay
- Río Coco – known locally as the Wanks, borders Honduras and is the longest river in Central America.
- Río Escondido
- Río Grande de Matagalpa
- Río San Juan – borders Costa Rica
- Río Kukalaya
- Río Kurinwás
- Río Mi
- Río Siquia
- Río Tipitapa
- Río Tuma
- Río Wawa
- River NÖamani

== By drainage basin ==
This list is arranged by drainage basin, with respective tributaries indented under each larger stream's name.

=== Rio Guasaule ===
- Rio Los Quesos
  - Rio El Gallo

=== Atlantic Ocean ===
- Coco River (Segovia River) (Wanki River)
  - Waspuk River
  - Lakus River
  - Bocay River
    - Amaka River
  - El Jicaro River
  - Estili River
- Ulang River
- Wawa River (Huahua River)
  - Likus River
- Kukalaya River
- Layasiksa River
- Prinzapolka River
  - Bambana River
  - Yaoya River
  - Uli River
  - Wani River
- Río Grande de Matagalpa
  - Tuma River
    - Iyás River
    - Yaosca River
  - Murra River
  - Olama River
- Kurinwás River
- Wawasang River
- Escondido River
  - Kama River
  - Mahogany River
  - Rama River
    - Plata River
  - Mico River
  - Siquia River
- Kukra River
- Punta Gorda River
- Maíz River
- Indio River
- San Juan River
  - Sábalos River
  - Lake Nicaragua
    - Tule River
    - Canastro River
    - Tepenaguasapa River
    - Oyate River
    - Ojocuapa River
      - Acoyapa River
    - Mayales River
      - Cuisalá River
    - Malacatoya River
    - Tipitapa River
      - Lake Managua
        - Viejo River (Grande River)
        - Sinecapa River
    - Ochomogo River
    - Sapoá River
    - Niño River (Pizote River)
    - Papaturro River
    - Zapote River
    - Frío River

=== Pacific Ocean ===
- Rio Brito
- Río Negro
- Estero Real River
  - Tecomapa River
- Tamarindo River
- Tecolapa River
- Casares River
- Escalante River

== See also ==
- Water resources management in Nicaragua
- List of rivers of the Americas by coastline
