= Mancotal Dam =

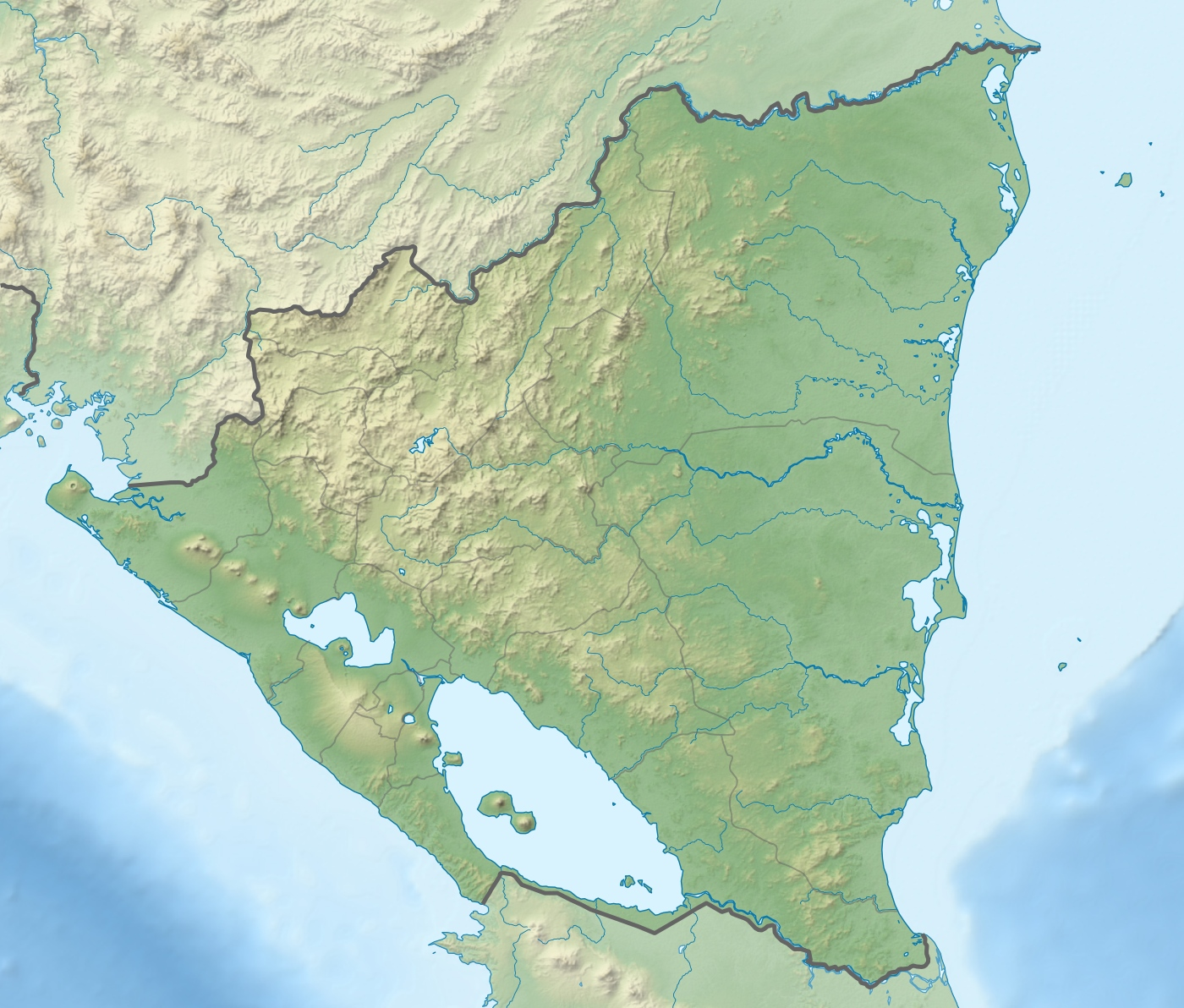
- Location within Nicaragua
- Official name: Presa Mancotal
- Country: Nicaragua
- Location: Asturias, Jinotega Department
- Coordinates: 13°14′42″N 85°54′07″W
- Purpose: Power
- Status: Operational
- Opening date: 1964; 62 years ago
- Owner: Empresa Nicaragüense de Electricidad (ENEL)

Dam and spillways
- Type of dam: Embankment
- Impounds: Tuma River
- Height: 50 m (160 ft)

Reservoir
- Creates: Lake Apanás
- Total capacity: 435,000,000 m^{3} (353,000 acre⋅ft)
- Surface area: 60 km^{2} (23 mi^{2})

Centro América Plant
- Coordinates: 13°06′24″N 86°03′05″W
- Commission date: 1964-1965
- Turbines: 2 x 25 MW Francis-type
- Installed capacity: 50 MW

The Mancotal Dam is an embankment dam on the Tuma River near Asturias in Jinotega Department, Nicaragua. It forms Lake Apanás, the largest reservoir in the country. The primary purpose of the dam is hydroelectric power generation and it supports the 50 MW Centro América Plant. The dam was completed and its first generator commissioned in 1964. The second generator was commissioned a year later on 18 March 1965. To generate power, water from the southwestern end of the Lake Apanás flows along a 4,000 m (13,000 ft) long channel before it enters a series of headrace pipes and a penstock. About 3.4 km (2.1 mi) to the south west the penstock meets Centro América Plant where it turns two 25 MW Francis turbines. After generating power the water is then discharged into the Viejo River. To supplement levels in the Lake Apanás, the El Dorado Dam was completed in 1985 and forms Lake Asturias just downstream of the Mancotal Dam. Water from Lake Asturias can be pumped into Lake Apanás. In 1998 heavy rains from Hurricane Mitch severely damaged the Mancotal and El Dorado Dams, over-topping their spillways and nearly destroying the dams. The Virgen Dam downstream on the Viejo River was destroyed but later rebuilt.

== See also ==
- Virgen Dam – on the Viejo River.
