= Earl S. Piper =

American Marine Corps Brigadier General

Earl Sanford Piper
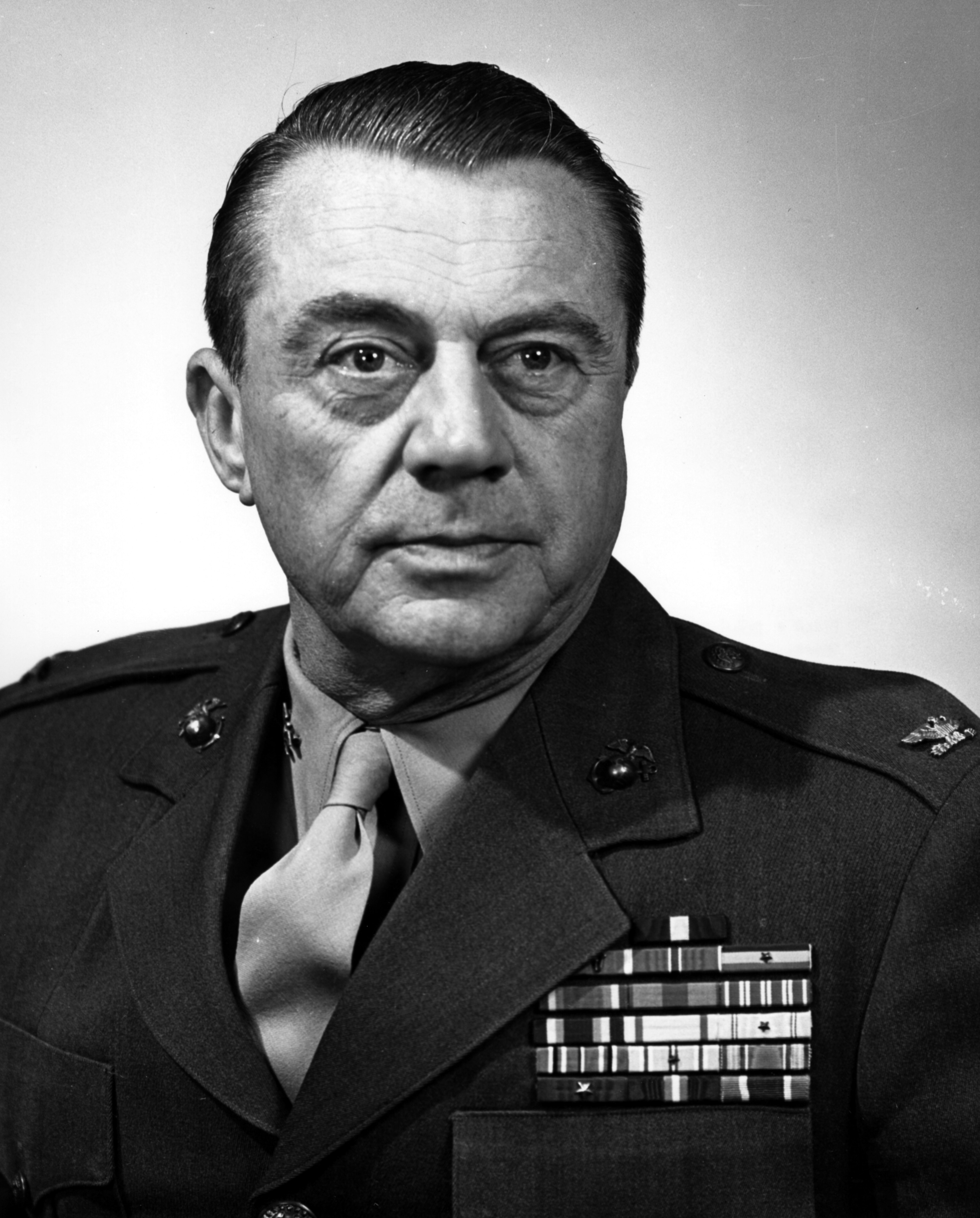
- BG Earl S. Piper, pictured as a Colonel
- Born: February 14, 1905; New London, Missouri, US
- Died: July 7, 1979 (aged 74); Winter Park, Florida, US
- Military career
- Allegiance: United States
- Branch: United States Marine Corps
- Service years: 1927–1957
- Rank: Brigadier general
- Service number: 0-4260
- Conflicts: Nicaraguan Campaign; Battle of La Flor; Yangtze Patrol; World War II; Battle of Iwo Jima; Chinese Civil War
- Awards: Navy Cross; Legion of Merit (2); Bronze Star Medal

Earl Sanford Piper (February 14, 1905 – July 7, 1979) was a highly decorated officer in the United States Marine Corps with the rank of brigadier general. A veteran of the Nicaraguan Campaign, Piper distinguished himself under fire and received the Navy Cross, the United States military's second-highest decoration awarded for valor in combat. He later participated in the Battle of Iwo Jima and the Chinese Civil War.

== Early life ==
Earl S. Piper was born on February 14, 1904, in New London, Missouri, as the son of Harry M. and Mary R. Piper. Following the graduation from high school in summer 1923, he received appointment to the United States Naval Academy at Annapolis, Maryland, where he was active in the soccer and basketball teams and also served on the staff of the Lucky Bag. Piper graduated with a bachelor's degree in June 1927 and was commissioned second lieutenant in the Marine Corps on that date.

Piper was then ordered to the Basic School at Philadelphia Navy Yard for basic officer training, which in the spring of 1928. He was subsequently ordered to Nicaragua and attached as platoon leader to the 11th Marine Regiment. While in that country, his regiment was attached to the 2nd Marine Brigade under the command of Brigadier General Logan Feland and participated in the maintaining peace during the Presidential elections of 1928, training the Nicaraguan National Guard and in jungle patrols against bandit forces under Augusto César Sandino.

On May 13 of that year, Piper was a member of patrol near Pena Blanca, where they were ambushed by Sandino Bandits. Commander of the patrol, Captain Robert S. Hunter, was mortally wounded and Piper assumed command of the patrol. He displayed exceptional bravery, coolness and leadership and repulsed enemy attack. The bandits were finally dispersed and driven off. For his act of valor during that engagement, Piper was decorated with the Navy Cross, the United States military's second-highest decoration awarded for valor in combat. He also received Nicaraguan Presidential Medal for Merit with Diploma.

Following his return to the United States in November 1929, Piper was attached to the 1st Battalion, 10th Marine Regiment at Quantico and served successively as commanding officer, Headquarters Company and as battalion adjutant until March 1931.

He was then ordered to the Marine barracks at Naval Base Cavite, Philippine Islands, and held variety of billets, including executive officer of the naval prison and town patrol officer. Piper remained on Philippines until September 1932, when he received orders for another expeditionary duty in China. While in that country, he was attached to the 4th Marine Regiment under Colonel Emile P. Moses at Shanghai International Settlement and served with 3rd Battalion as quartermaster and later as officer in Company K. While in that capacity, he was promoted to the rank of first lieutenant.

Piper was ordered back to the United States in January 1935 and attended the Junior Course at Marine Corps Schools, Quantico. He graduated in May of that year and reported to the Special Service Squadron for sea duty as commanding officer of the Marine detachment aboard the light cruiser USS Memphis. Piper then commanded marine detachments aboard the gunboats USS Charleston and USS Erie and participated in the voyages to the Mediterranean Sea. He was promoted to captain during his service in that assignments.

== World War II ==
In June 1938, Piper was attached to the Office of Naval Intelligence and ordered to Mexico, where he served as assistant naval attache at the American embassy in Mexico City. He served in this capacity for next five years and was promoted successively to major and lieutenant colonel. He was decorated with the Peruvian Order of Naval Merit during his service in this capacity.

Piper returned to the United States in January 1944 and assumed duty as operations officer on the staff of 5th Marine Division under Major General Keller E. Rockey at Camp Pendleton, California. He participated in intensive training of the division and later assumed duty as divisional logistics officer. Piper went overseas with 5th Marine Division in mid-1944 and participated as colonel in the Iwo Jima campaign in February and March 1945, during which he was responsible for the planning and organization of logistics. For his part in the Iwo Jima Campaign, Piper received the Legion of Merit with Combat "V".

When general Rockey was ordered to the command of III Marine Amphibious Corps in North China at the end of June 1945, Piper followed him as Corps Logistical officer. He was stationed in Qingdao and was responsible for the planning and coordination of logistical support for all subordinate troops including 1st and 6th Marine Divisions. He held that responsibility during the Chinese Civil War and received his second Legion of Merit, Bronze Star Medal and Order of Cloud and Banner by the Republic of China.

== Later Service ==
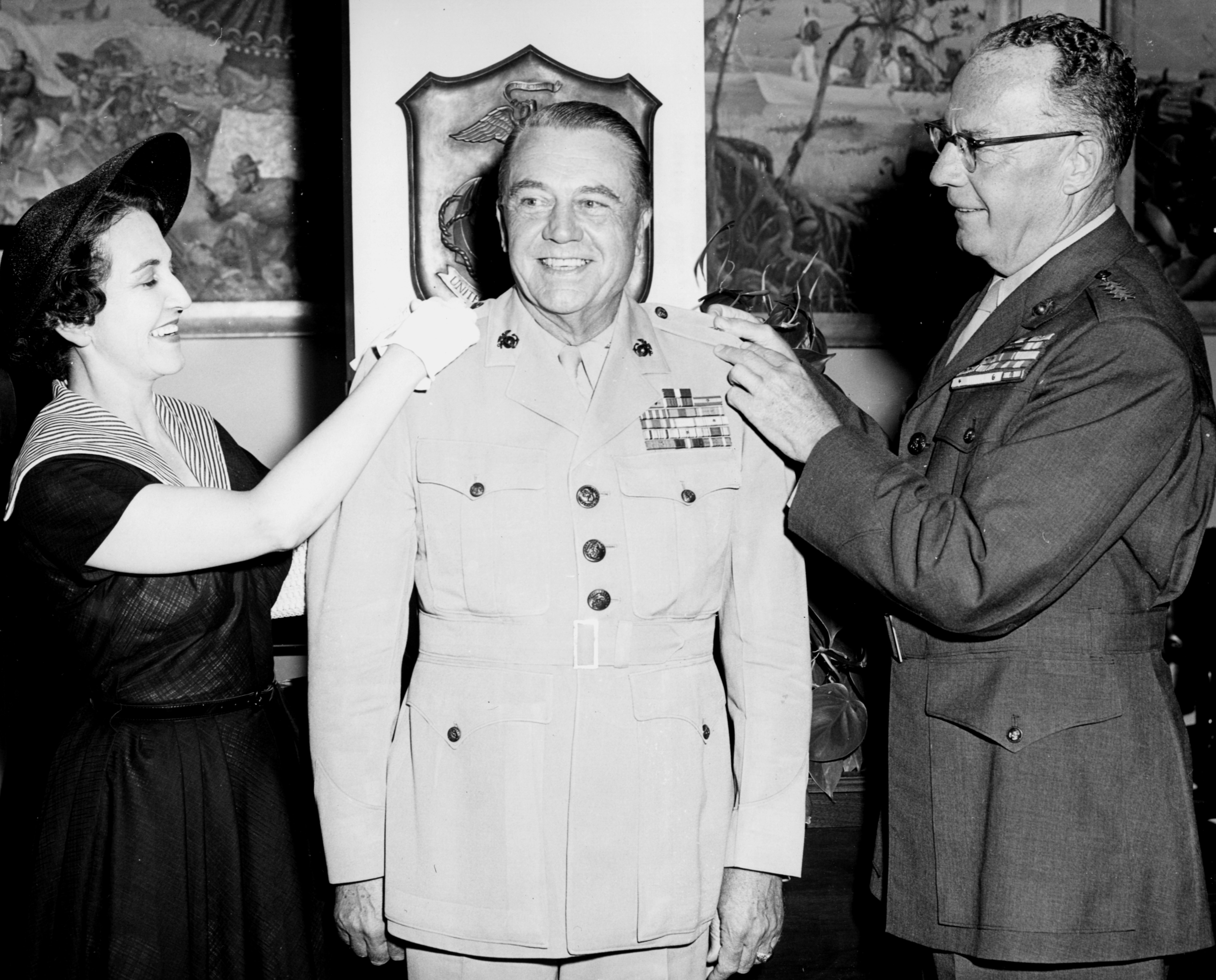
Piper during his retirement promotion to brigadier general with his wife Elizabeth and Commandant, Randolph M. Pate, June 28, 1957.

Piper was ordered back to the United States in July 1946 and assumed duty as assistant chief of staff for logistics with Troop Training Unit, Training Command, Amphibious Forces, Pacific. He served in this capacity under Major General LeRoy P. Hunt until June 1948, when he was sent to Newport, Rhode Island, for instruction at the Naval War College.

He graduated in June 1949 and joined the headquarters of Fleet Marine Force, Atlantic at Norfolk, Virginia. Piper served again as assistant chief of staff for logistics under his previous superior, general Hunt, before he joined the headquarters of commander in chief, U.S. Naval Forces, Eastern Atlantic and Mediterranean in Naples, Italy, under Admiral Robert B. Carney.

Piper completed two years of duty there and returned to the United States for duty as director, Senior School at Marine Corps Schools, Quantico under Lieutenant General Clifton B. Cates. He later held command of 2nd Combat Service Group at Camp Lejeune, North Carolina, and his unit consisted of engineer company, signal company, military police company, ordnance company, supply company, transport company and several Marine ammo companies, which provided support for 2nd Marine Division.

His final assignment came in September 1954, when he was appointed commanding officer, Marine Barracks at Washington Navy Yard. Piper held this assignment until his retirement on June 30, 1957, after 30 years of commissioned service. Upon his retirement from active service, he was advanced to the rank of brigadier general on the retired list for having been specially commended in combat.

== Death ==
Brigadier General Earl S. Piper died on July 7, 1979, in Winter Park, Florida.

== Decorations ==
Here is the ribbon bar of Brigadier General Earl S. Piper:

1st Row	Navy Cross			
2nd Row	Legion of Merit with Combat "V" and one 5/16" Gold Star	Bronze Star Medal	Navy Presidential Unit Citation with one star	Navy Unit Commendation
3rd Row	Marine Corps Expeditionary Medal	Second Nicaraguan Campaign Medal	Yangtze Service Medal	China Service Medal
4th Row	American Defense Service Medal with Base Clasp	American Campaign Medal	Asiatic-Pacific Campaign Medal with one 3/16 inch service star	World War II Victory Medal
5th Row	National Defense Service Medal	Nicaraguan Presidential Medal of Merit with Diploma	Order of Naval Merit, Peru	Order of Cloud and Banner, 5th Class (Republic of China)

=== Navy Cross citation ===
Citation:

The President of the United States of America takes pleasure in presenting the Navy Cross to Second Lieutenant Earl Sanford Piper (MCSN: 0-4260), United States Marine Corps, for distinguished service in the line of his profession as acting commander of a patrol of the Second Brigade, U.S. Marine Corps, during an engagement with bandits at Pena Blanca, Nicaragua on 13 May 1928. During an attack by bandits, and after the commanding officer, the late Captain Robert S. Hunter, U.S. Marine Corps, had been mortally wounded, Second Lieutenant Piper assumed the command of the force and by his display of bravery, coolness and leadership so conducted the engagement that the attacks of the numerically superior and well armed bandit force were repulsed. The bandits finally were dispersed and driven off.
