= Tumarín Dam =

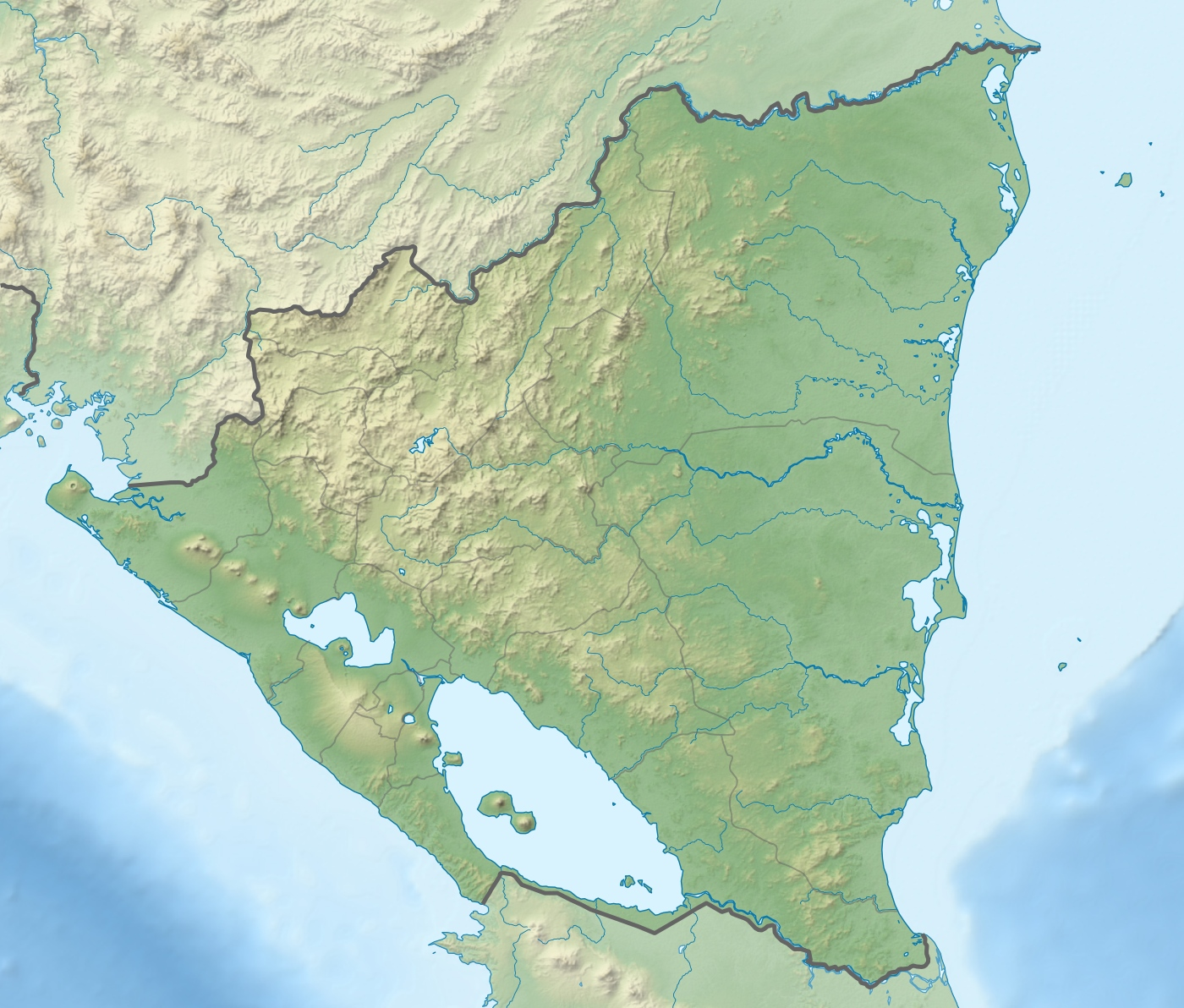
- Location within Nicaragua
- Official name: Presa Tumarín
- Country: Nicaragua
- Location: Tumarín
- Coordinates: 13°0′30.79″N 84°24′25.24″W
- Purpose: Power
- Status: Stalled
- Opening date: Unknown
- Construction cost: US$1.1 billion

Dam and spillways
- Type of dam: Gravity, roller-compacted concrete
- Impounds: Río Grande de Matagalpa
- Height: 45 m (148 ft)
- Length: 350 m (1,150 ft)

Reservoir
- Total capacity: 200,000,000 m^{3} (160,000 acre⋅ft)
- Catchment area: 15,300 km^{2} (5,900 mi^{2})
- Surface area: 20 km^{2} (7.7 mi^{2})
- Maximum water depth: 30 m (98 ft)

Power Station
- Turbines: 3 x 84.22 Kaplan-type
- Installed capacity: 253 MW
- Annual generation: 1,184 GWh (est.)

The Tumarín Dam is a 60 meter tall, concrete gravity dam under construction on the Río Grande de Matagalpa, just upstream of the town of Tumarín in the South Caribbean Coast Autonomous Region, Nicaragua. It is located about 35 km (22 mi) east of San Pedro del Norte, where the Río Grande de Matagalpa meets the Tuma River. Aiming at generating power, it will be the largest hydropower dam in Nicaragua and one of the largest ones in Central America when completed.

The power station located at the base of the dam will house three 84.33 MW Kaplan turbine-generators for an installed capacity of 253 MW. The dam will create a reservoir covering 40 square kilometers.

The project is being developed by Centrales Hidroelectricas de Nicaragua (CHN). Brazil's Eletrobras was to fund the US$1.1 billion under a 20 to 30 year build–operate–transfer (BOT) agreement. First announced in March 2010, preliminary construction (roads, bridges and foundation) was to begin in 2011, and operations on the plant were projected to start by February 2015, after a 4-year-long construction. However, there have been many delays. In 2016, the dam project was indefinitely suspended due to Eletrobras' economic and legal troubles, in connection with the Brazilian economic crisis. The project is still stalled as of January 2020.
