= Cimarron Hydroelectric Power Project =

Proposed power plant in El Salvador

El Cimarrón hydroelectric project
- Country: El Salvador
- Coordinates: 14°15′34″N 89°16′10″W
- Purpose: Power
- Status: Proposed
- Construction cost: $455 million
- Owner(s): Comisión Hidroeléctrica del Río Lempa

Dam and spillways
- Impounds: Lempa River

Reservoir
- Total capacity: 592 million m^{3}
- Surface area: 15.3 km²

Power Station
- Hydraulic head: 354 m
- Installed capacity: 261 MW
- Annual generation: 863 GW·h

Cimarron Hydroelectric Power Project a hydroelectric power plant in El Salvador, that was to start construction in 2010. The plant would have been be located in the upper basin of the Lempa River, upstream of the Cerrón Grande Hydroelectric Dam. The proposed location of the dam was between the town of Agua Caliente on the left shore and Metapán, Santa Ana, on the right shore. A tunnel would divert water from the Lempa River to a powerhouse and substation to be built near Agua Caliente. With an estimated capacity of 261 megawatts, the project would have increased El Salvador's total generation capacity by almost 25%.

The project was abandoned in 2009 by President Mauricio Funes, but has been considered again since 2016.

== Main features ==
The dam would be built at 695 meters above sea level and would have had a height of 165 m and a length of 660 m. The dam reservoir would have covered an area of 15.3 km² and a capacity of 592 million m³. The main stream tunnel was to conduct a total flow of 83.1 cubic meters per second from the dam to the plant; Four vertical axis Pelton turbines, with an installed capacity of 261 megawatt, would generate a yearly average of 686.7GWh. A 235 kV power line will connect the power plant to the national grid.

Environmental impact studies, initiated in 2005 and concluded in 2007, identified mitigation measures. One hundred and fifty families would have been relocated from their current homes. Waters of the Lempa River would have been diverted towards the Metayate River by way of a 1,200 meters discharge channel. The natural flow of the Lempa River would therefore be altered for a total length of 30 kilometers.

In El Salvador, the evolution of current oil prices made the Cimarrón Project more attractive than fossil thermal plants, which could provide comparable output. The estimated rate of return (ERR) of the Cimarrón is 12.23%.

== Environmental concerns ==
Opponents of the project pointed to various drawbacks of the proposed project, but the issue at hand was the consequences that the dam would have had on the water flow of the Lempa River. The river already has four hydroelectric dams and represents some of the scarce water resources of the country. The Lempa River is the only river that can be of practical use for dams of significant electrical output in El Salvador.

The Latinamerican Water Tribunal summarizes an ongoing complaint: “The Fundacion Rio Lempa along with the Comite Ambiental de Chalatenango, filed a complaint against the imminent construction and operation of "El Cimarron" Hydroelectric Power Project on the Lempa River, located in the Chalatenango Department. The opposing parties claim that such project poses a serious environmental and health threat for thousands of inhabitants, with further negative repercussions on the already deteriorated Lempa river basin.”

On the other hand, in 2000, the Central American Water Tribunal resolved to ask the Salvadoran government to stop construction of the project, and to request the World Bank to stop financing it.

A study by the National University of Costa Rica presents an accurate view on the extreme dependence that El Salvador has on the Lempa River, and therefore the tremendous impact that this project will exert on this vital resource. Forty eight percent of El Salvador's population lives in cities, towns and villages (including the capital city) in the Lempa River basin, which covers 49% of the Salvadoran territory.

Paradoxically, the economic aspect of the project which appeared to be its driving force used by government agencies to gain support in the eyes of international lenders, may have become its most detrimental side after all. As a result of ever increasing prices of materials, due to the 2008 world recession, the initial building costs which were estimated at 400 million dollars have tripled to 1,100 million dollars. This amount in itself represents at least 1/20 of the Nominal GDP of the country which is 22,115 billion dollars.

== See also ==
- Electricity sector in El Salvador
