= Nuclear power in El Salvador =

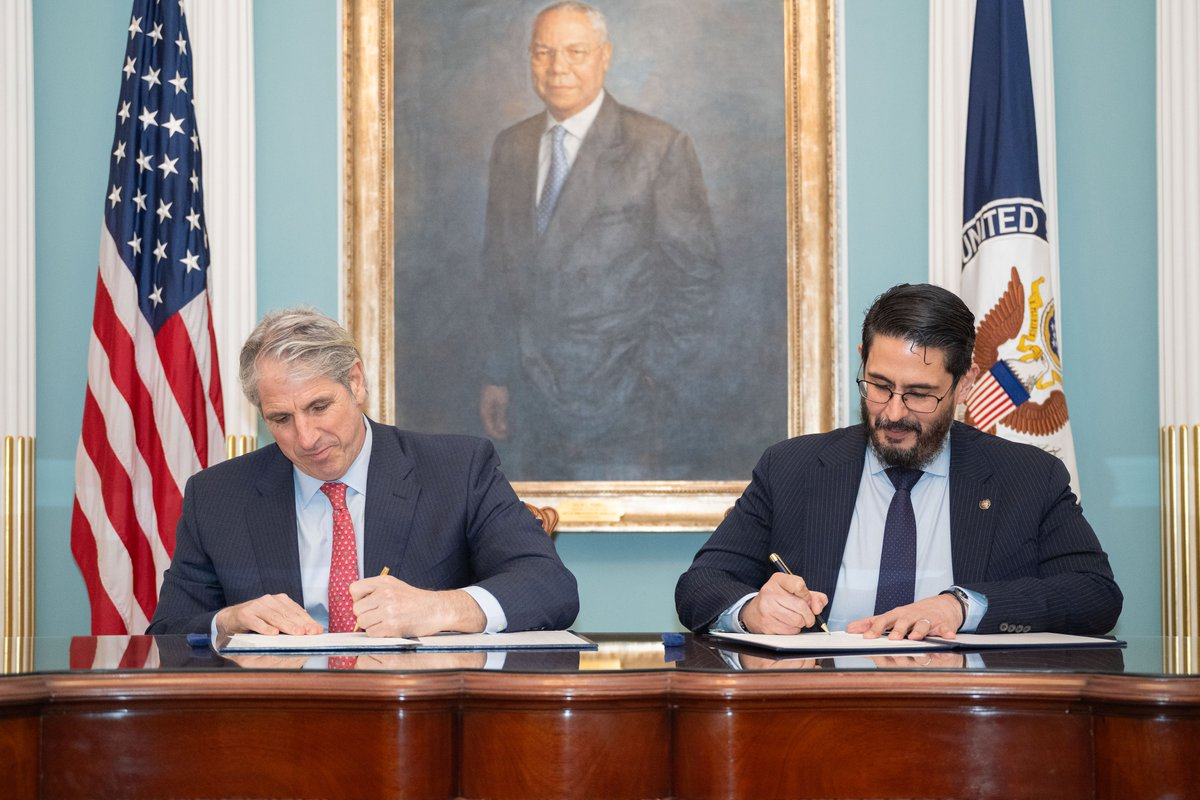
American Under Secretary of State for Arms Control and International Security Thomas G. DiNanno and Salvadoran Director of Energy Daniel Álvarez signing Agreement 123 in March 2026

El Salvador has been working on opening a nuclear power plant since 2023. The Legislative Assembly of El Salvador approved the Nuclear Energy Law in 2024 and began searching for potential sites to build a nuclear power plant the following year. In 2026, El Salvador and the United States signed Agreement 123 under the Atomic Energy Act of 1954 to open a nuclear power plant by 2030.

== History ==
In March 2023, El Salvador signed an agreement with the Thorium Energy Alliance to develop a "comprehensive and strategic plan" to establish a thorium-powered nuclear power plant in El Salvador. On 22 October 2024, the Legislative Assembly of El Salvador approved the Nuclear Energy Law by a 57–3 vote. The law aims to establish a nuclear power plant that is operated year-round by 400 personnel, produces 100 megawatts of energy, and accounts for 26% of El Salvador's electricity production by 2050. The Nuclear Energy Law was supposed to go into effect on 28 October 2025, but in September 2025, the Legislative Assembly voted to postpone its implementation until 28 June 2026.

In June 2025, the Lempa River Executive Hydroelectric Commission launched Mission SEED 2025 to evaluate where would be the best location to build a nuclear power plant with possible sites in Chalatenango and San Vicente. On 13 March 2026, Under Secretary of State for Arms Control and International Security Thomas G. DiNanno announced that the US and El Salvador had completed negotiations for Agreement 123 to establish nuclear technology cooperation between both countries under the Atomic Energy Act of 1954. El Salvador plans to have an operational nuclear power plant by 2030, becoming the fourth Latin American country with such a power plant after Argentina, Brazil, and Mexico.

== Opposition ==
The Nationalist Republican Alliance (ARENA) and Vamos were the only political parties whose deputies voted against the Nuclear Energy Law in October 2024. ARENA deputy Marcela Villatoro criticized the law as it would not affect Salvadorans for at least seven years and suggested that El Salvador should instead invest in renewable energy, arguing that "it's cheaper and generates three times more jobs" ("es más barata y genera tres veces más empleo"). Vamos deputy Claudia Ortiz described the law was "out of touch" ("desviada") with the needs of Salvadorans.

== See also ==
- Electricity sector in El Salvador
- Nuclear power by country
