= SIEPAC =

Power grid interconnection

SIEPAC Central American Electrical Interconnection System
- Map of SIEPAC; Central American Electrical Interconnection System

Location
- Country: Panama; Costa Rica; Honduras; Nicaragua; El Salvador; Guatemala

Ownership information
- Operator: Empresa Proprietaria de la Red

Construction information
- Commissioned: April 2013

Technical information
- Total length: 1,789.23 km (1,111.78 mi)
- Capacity: 300 MW
- AC voltage: 230 kV

SIEPAC (Central American Electrical Interconnection System, Spanish: Sistema de Interconexión Eléctrica de los Países de América Central) is an interconnection of the power grids of six Central American nations. The project has been discussed since 1987. The constructed new transmission lines connect 37 million consumers in Panama, Costa Rica, Honduras, Nicaragua, El Salvador, and Guatemala. It was expected to be completed in April 2013, and was completed in 2014. There is controversy about the benefits and indirect environmental impacts of the project.

== Technical description ==
SIEPAC network includes 21 interconnected 230 kV transmission lines totaling 1,789.23 kilometres (1,111.78 mi) with a capacity of 300 MW between South American countries Guatemala and Panama equipped with 10.24.5 MCM ACAR conductor and 2 guard wires, 21 substations as well as improvements to existing systems. At the second stage the capacity will be increased up to 600 MW via second circuit. SIEPAC cost about US$320 million without the proposed interconnections with Mexico (US$ 40M), Belize (US$ 30M) and Panama (US$ 200m). and, back in 2003, was scheduled for completion in 2006. SIEPAC lines had an uptime of 99.62% in 2023 with 68 breakdowns per 100 kilometres (62 mi).

== Expected benefits ==
Proponents of SIEPAC expect that interconnecting the nations' electrical transmission grids will alleviate periodic power shortages in the region, reduce operating costs, optimize shared use of hydroelectric power, create a competitive energy market in the region, and attract foreign investment in power generation and transmission systems. It has been claimed that the cost of energy for consumers could go down as much as 20% from US$0.11 per kWh to US$0.09 per kWh as a result of the project. A feasibility study in 1995 by Power Technologies Inc. outlined various scenarios for the expansion of power demand and supply in the region and associated investments. The median scenario foresaw that SIEPAC would induce annual investments of US$700m over a 10-year period once the regional electricity market had begun operating.

== Ownership and regulation ==
SIEPAC is owned by a regional operations entity (Empresa Proprietaria de la Red - EPR), created in 1999 with registration in Panama comprising public utilities and transmission companies from the six participating countries (75%) and private capital (25%). In some countries integrated utilities are shareholders - ENEE of Honduras, ICE and CNFL of Costa Rica - while in others shares are held by transmission companies - INDE of Guatemala, ETESA of Panama, and ENTE of Nicaragua. In the case of El Salvador the utility CEL and the transmission company ETESAL own the shares jointly. The private shareholders are Endesa of Spain and ISA from Colombia.

The establishment of a regional electricity regulator has been considered. While the Inter-American Development Bank (IDB) had suggested that electricity generating companies should not be allowed to hold shares in the transmission company, this has apparently been accepted by the governments of Central America.

The project is currently managed by a unit under the Central American Electrification Council (Consejo de Electrificación de América Central - CEAC).

== Financing ==
The funding for the project was originally expected to come from the Inter-American Development Bank, having initially pledged $170 million in hard and soft loans to the six Central American countries, the Spanish government, offering $70 million and the Central American nations. The contributions of the Central American nations had been initially estimated at up to US$106 million. However, it turned out that they will rather provide around US$35 million in-kind contributions, such as land and existing facilities. It had also been reported that Endesa would contribute 20% of the project costs through equity, an amount that was later reduced. Subsequently the IDB had to increase its exposure to US$240 million and the Central American Bank for Economic Integration (CBEI) was called in to provide additional support through three loans totaling US$90 million. The Colombian firm ISA also joined EPR as a shareholder.

More than 90% of the rights of way for the line had been acquired by May 2007. It is expected that the project can benefit from carbon finance under the Clean Development Mechanism of the Kyoto Protocol.

== Criticism ==
Critics have argued that the project will not make electricity cheaper for consumers in Central America, but may actually increase tariffs. Some critics also argue that SIEPAC will facilitate electricity exports to Mexico and not contribute to expand access in Central America. It is also argued that much of the increased generation capacity facilitated by SIEPAC would be in the form of large hydropower with associated social and environmental costs. Also, there are fears that the dominance of the power sector in Central America by large foreign corporations would increase. Finally, there are some environmental concerns related to the transmission line itself. The initial Environmental Impact Assessment financed by the IDB analyzed only the direct impacts of the transmission line and not its indirect impacts from induced power generation.

== See also ==
- Electricity sector in El Salvador
- Electricity sector in Honduras
- Electricity sector in Nicaragua
- Mesoamerica Project, formerly known as Puebla-Panama Plan (Plan Puebla-Panamá)
