= Virgen Dam =

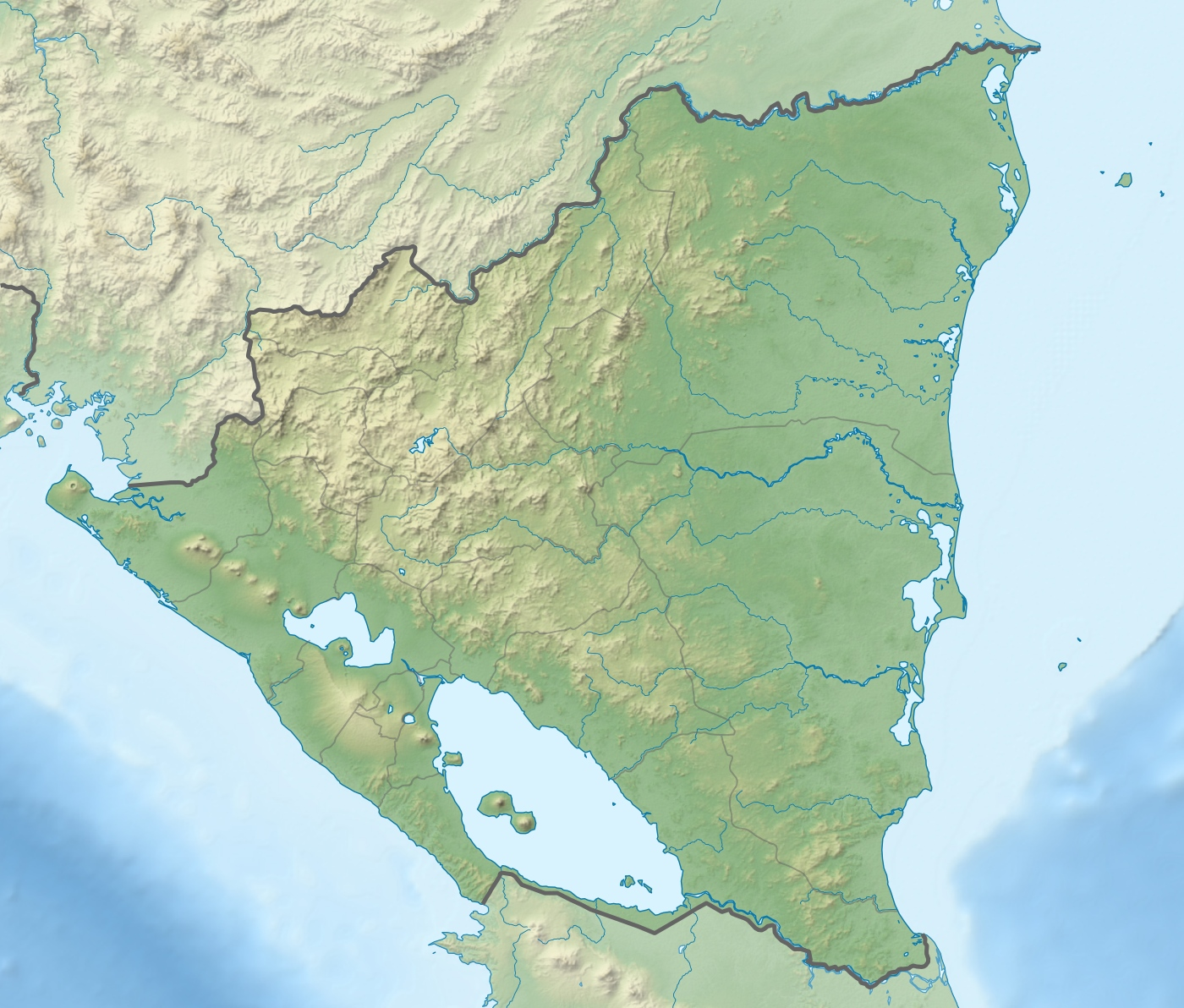
- Location within Nicaragua
- Official name: Presa La Virgen
- Country: Nicaragua
- Location: El Hato de La Virgen, Matagalpa Department
- Coordinates: 12°46′24.26″N 86°14′9.21″W
- Purpose: Power
- Status: Operational
- Opening date: 1972; 54 years ago
- Owner: Empresa Nicaragüense de Electricidad (ENEL)

Dam and spillways
- Type of dam: Embankment
- Impounds: Viejo River

Reservoir
- Creates: Lake Virgen
- Surface area: 6 km^{2} (2.3 mi^{2})

Carlos Fonesca (Santa Barbara) Plant
- Coordinates: 12°42′54.64″N 86°16′46.41″W
- Commission date: 1972
- Hydraulic head: 187 m (614 ft)
- Turbines: 2 x 25 MW (34,000 hp) Francis-type
- Installed capacity: 50 MW (67,000 hp)

The Virgen Dam is an embankment dam on the Viejo River near the town of El Hato de La Virgen in Matagalpa Department, Nicaragua. The primary purpose of the dam is hydroelectric power generation and it supports the 50 MW (67,000 hp) run-of-the-river Carlos Fonesca (Santa Barbara) Plant. The dam and power station were completed in 1972. Water from the dam is diverted along the left bank of the river through a 2.7-kilometre (1.7 mi) long channel before being piped underground over 4.8 km (3.0 mi) to the power plant near Santa Barbara on the Viejo River. The plant contains two 25 megawatts (34,000 hp) Francis turbine-generators. The difference in elevation between the dam and power station affords a hydraulic head (water drop) of 187 metres (614 ft).

In 1998 heavy rains and flooding from Hurricane Mitch severely damaged the Mancotal and El Dorado Dams, over-topping their spillways and nearly destroying the dams. The Virgen Dam was destroyed but later rebuilt.
