= Electricity sector in El Salvador =

El Salvador: Electricity sector

Data
- Electricity coverage(2006): 83.4% (total), 72% (rural), 97% (urban); (LAC total average in 2007: 92%)
- Installed capacity(2006): 1,312 MW
- Share of fossil energy: 40%
- Share of renewable energy: 60% (hydroelectric & geothermal)
- GHG emissions from electricity generation (2003): 1.57 MtCO_{2}
- Average electricity use (2006): 702 kWh per capita
- Distribution losses (2006): 12.4%
- Transmission losses (2006): 1.7%
- Residential consumption (% of total): 33%
- Industrial consumption (% of total): n/a
- Commercial consumption (% of total): n/a
- Average residential tariff (US$/kWh, 2006): 0.139; (LAC average in 2005: 0.115)
- Average industrial tariff (US$/kWh, 2006): 0.103; (LAC average in 2005: 0.107)
- Average commercial tariff (US$/kWh, 2006): n/a
- Annual investment in electricity: n/a

Institutions
- Sector unbundling: Yes
- Share of private sector generation: 65%
- Competitive supply to large users: Yes
- Competitive supply to residential users: No
- Number of service providers: 11 (generation), 1 (transmission), 5 (distribution)
- National electricity regulator: Yes (SIGET)
- Responsibility for policy setting: Ministry of Economy
- Responsibility for renewable energy: Ministry of Economy
- Responsibility for the environment: Ministry of Environment and Natural Resources (MARNA)
- Electricity Sector Law: Yes (1996)
- Renewable Energy Law: Yes (2007)
- CDM transactions related to the electricity sector: 3 registered CDM project; 385,533 t CO_{2}e annual emissions reductions

El Salvador's energy sector is largely focused on renewables. El Salvador is the largest producer of geothermal energy in Central America. Except for hydroelectric generation, which is almost totally owned and operated by the public company CEL (Comisión Hidroeléctrica del Río Lempa), the rest of the generation capacity is in private hands. With demand expected to grow at a rate of 5% in the coming years, the Government's 2007 National Energy Strategy identified several hydroelectric and geothermal projects as the best option to meet demand in the future and to diversify the country's energy mix.

This would also reduce the dependence on traditional thermal sources and, with that, the vulnerability to high oil prices that the country started to face in 2005. El Salvador is also one of the countries included in the SIEPAC project, which will integrate the electricity network of the country with the rest of the Central American region.

== Electricity supply and demand ==
=== Installed capacity ===
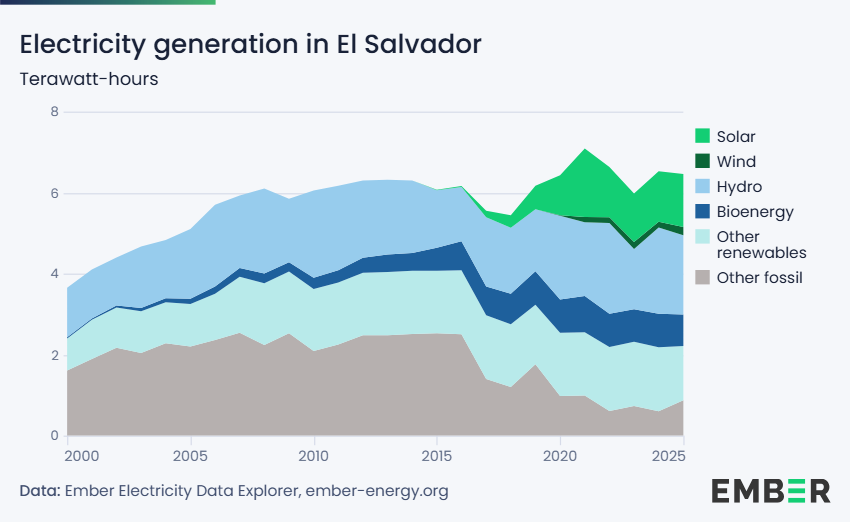
Electricity generation in El Salvador in terawatt-hours

El Salvador is the country with the highest geothermal energy production in Central America. Total installed capacity in 2006 was 1,312 MW, of which 52% was thermal, 36% hydroelectric and 12% geothermal. The largest share of generation capacity (65%) was in private hands. In terms of evolution, installed capacity has almost doubled in the last 20 years and increased by 200 MW since the year 2000.

Gross electricity generation in 2006 was 5,195 GWh, of which 40% came from traditional thermal sources, 38% from hydroelectricity, 20% from geothermal sources, and 2% from biomass.

=== Demand ===
In 2006, total electricity sold in El Salvador was 4,794 GWh, which corresponds to 702kWh annual per capita consumption. The residential sector accounted for 33% of the consumption, with the unregulated market making up for 11% of the electricity consumed.

Maximum demand in the wholesale electricity market was 881 MW, 6.3% higher than the figure for 2005.

=== Demand versus supply ===
Increase in maximum demand since the year 2000 has been matched by similar increases in installed capacity. Average annual increase in maximum demand has been 2.6%, while average increase in installed capacity has been 2.9%, with increase percentages above 6% for both measures for the year 2006. The nominal reserve margin for the system in 2004 was 36%. Although high, this number does not capture the vulnerability of the generation system to particular unit outages, especially those related to hydroelectric capacity and availability.

As for the future, demand is expected to grow at an annual rate of 5% in the coming years. Peak demand is expected to grow from 833 MW in 2005 to 1,030 MW in 2010. Planning simulations indicate that the risk of power rationing is unlikely to occur until 2010 even if there is a delay in the commissioning of the SIEPAC interconnection. The 2007 National Energy Strategy identifies the geothermal and hydroelectric projects more likely to be executed in order to close the gap between demand and supply in the future and to meet the objective of diversifying the country's energy mix.

== Access to electricity ==
In 1995, only 65.5% of the population in El Salvador had access to electricity. Currently, the electrification index is 83.4%. This coverage is higher than that in Guatemala (83.1%), Honduras (71.2%) and Nicaragua (55%) but lower than the one for Costa Rica (98.3%) and Panamá (87.1%) and also below the 94.6 average for LAC. Electrification in most major urban centers is estimated to be above 97%, whereas rural coverage is around 72%. The Ministry of Economy's plans seek to reach a 93% rural electrification index by 2009. This ambitious plan includes the expansion of the distribution network as well as the installation of photovoltaic solar panels in areas that are isolated from the network.

== Service quality ==
=== Interruption frequency and duration ===
In 2005, the average number of interruptions per subscriber was 12, while duration of interruptions per subscriber was 16 hours. This is very close to the weighted averages for LAC, which are 13 interruptions and 14 hours respectively.

=== Distribution and transmission losses ===
In 2006, distribution losses in El Salvador were 12.4%, only higher than those of Costa Rica (9.4%) and below the regional Central American average of 16.2%. On the other hand, transmission losses were as low as 1.7% for the same year.

== Responsibilities in the electricity sector ==
=== Policy and regulation ===
The regulatory entities for the electricity sector in El Salvador are:

- The Electrical Energy Directorate (DEE - Dirección de Energía Eléctrica), created in 2001, is the administrative Unit within the Ministry of Economy that is in charge of elaborating, proposing, coordinating and executing policies, programs, projects and other actions in the electricity sector.
- The General Superintendence of Electricity and Telecommunications (SIGET) is the regulatory body for both the electricity and telecommunications sector. SIGET is in charge of regulating the power market, the distribution companies and consumer prices.

In 2006, the President created the National Energy Council (CNE), which has the role of analyzing El Salvador's energy situation as well as the Government proposals, recommending the inclusion of new actions and strategies. The CNE seeks to contribute to a shift in generation towards renewable energy and to modify consumption patterns toward the efficient use of energy.

The Transactions Unit (UT) is the private company in charge of administering the wholesale electricity market, being in charge of system dispatch and performing clearing-house functions. UT is also responsible for the operation of the transmission system.

In 2025 the National Assebmbly published the new Ley General de Electricidad transforming the sector into a regulated market. Energy producers must seek approval from Direccion General de Energia y Minas before celebrating contracts with distributors such as AES CLESA or DEL SUR. This new authority gives the ministry power over pricing regardless of what generators and distributors are willing to agree.

The Ministry now holds authority over SIGET and UT, it is noteworthy that all these institutions and CEL (public power generation) are directed by Daniel Alvarez. The Ministry plans to instruct what prices buyers and sellers can transact at, a shift from previous authorities where private parties could agree on the termns of generation.

=== Generation ===
In 2006, there were 11 generation companies in El Salvador. Of the 22 generating plants, 18 were in private hands. The only public company with a stake in generation is CEL (Comisión Hidroeléctrica del Río Lempa), which owns 97% of the hydroelectric capacity. The number and type of plants operated by each company is as follows:

Type	Company name	No. of plants	Installed capacity (MW)
WHOLESALE MARKET		13	1,157.3
Public companies		4	460.3
Hydroelectric		4	460.3
	CEL	4	460.3
Private companies		9	697
Geothermal		2	151.2
	LaGeo	2	151.2
Thermal		7	545.8
	CESSA	1	32.6
	CLESA	1	0
	Duke	3	318
	Invers.Ene	1	51.2
	Nejapa	1	144
RETAIL MARKET		9	155.5
Private companies		9	155.5
Hydroelectric		3	12.3
	CECSA	1	8
	De Matheu	1	1.5
	Sensunapán	1	2.8
Thermal		6	143.2
	Borealis	1	13.6
	CASSA	1	29
	EGI Holdco	1	5.5
	Ing. Cabaña	1	21
	Ing. Ángel	1	30
	Textufil	1	44.1
TOTAL		22	1,312.8

Source: CEPAL 2007

=== Transmission ===
In El Salvador, one government-owned company, Etesal (Empresa Transmisora de El Salvador), which was constituted in 1999 after the restructuring of CEL (Comisión Ejecutiva Hidroeléctrica del Río Lempa), is responsible for the maintenance and expansion of the transmission system.

=== Distribution ===
In El Salvador, there are five distribution companies. The market share for each of them in 2006 was:

- CAESS: 44%
- Delsur: 25%
- AES-CLESA: 18%
- EEO: 10%
- Deusem: 2%

CAESS, CLESA, EEO (Empresa Eléctrica de Oriente) and Deusem (Distribuidora Eléctrica de Oriente) are controlled by AES Corporation.

== Renewable energy resources ==
The 2007 National Energy Policy supports the diversification and increase of energy sources, mainly through renewable energy such as hydroelectricity, geothermal, solar, wind power and biofuels (as well as mineral coal and natural gas). Besides hydroelectricity and geothermal energy, the government foresees the addition of 50 MW of renewable generation in the next 10 years in the form of wind power, solar power, biomass and mini-hydroelectric plants.

In November 2007, El Salvador approved the Fiscal Incentives Law for the Promotion of Renewable Energy. This new legal framework includes incentives such as a 10-year tax exemption for projects below 10 MW of generation capacity. A new System for the Promotion of Renewable Energy (SIFER) contemplates the creation of a Revolving Fund for the Promotion of Renewable Energy (FOFER) that would provide soft loans and guarantees and assist in the financing of feasibility studies for new projects.

=== Hydroelectricity ===
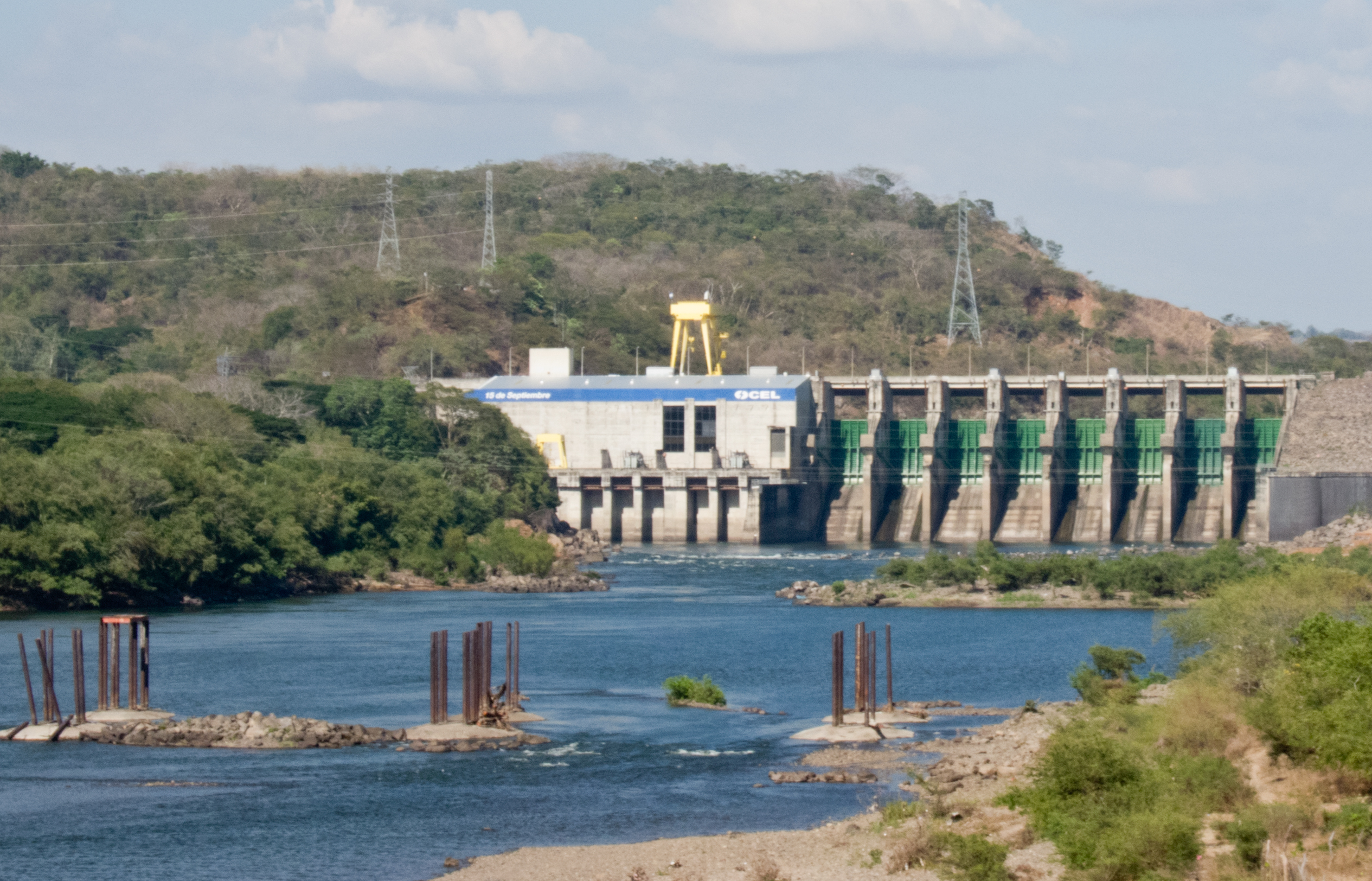
15 de Septiembre Hydroelectric dam over the Rio Lempa

Currently, hydroelectric plants account only for 36% of the electricity produced in El Salvador. The public company CEL (Comisión Hidroeléctrica del Río Lempa) owns and operates 97% of the capacity. The four hydroelectric plants in El Salvador are: 5 de Noviembre (81.4 MW), Guajoyo (15MW), Cerrón Grande (135 MW), and 15 de Septiembre (156.3 MW), all of them on the Lempa River.

In this sector, the projects currently underway are:

- Upgrading of the two units in the 15 de Septiembre plant with 24 MW of new capacity
- New hydroelectric plant, the 66 MW El Chaparral
- New hydroelectric plant, the 261 MW Cimarron Hydroelectric Power Plant

This expansion of the hydroelectric capacity would add 351 MW to the system in the next 5 years, a 76% increase in current capacity. In addition, if the bi-national projects El Tigre (in the Lempa River) and El Jobo and Piedra de Toro (in the Paz River) with Honduras and Guatemala were carried out, 488 MW of additional capacity would be added to the generation system.

=== Wind ===
El Salvador's wind potential is currently being studied by Comisión Hidroeléctrica del Río Lempa (CEL) and the Finnish Meteorological Institute (FMI).

=== Solar ===
A solar map of the country is also under development.

=== Geothermal ===
Currently, there are two geothermal facilities in operation in El Salvador, the 95 MW Ahuachapan, and the 66 MW Berlin plant. Majority state-owned power company LaGeo, formerly Gesal, operates the two plants. LaGeo is currently expanding the two existing geothermal plants, as well as conducting a feasibility study for a third plant, Cuyanausul. It is expected that the three projects add 64 MW of installed electric generation capacity by 2007.

The 2007 National Energy Strategy determines that potential geothermal capacity in El Salvador is about 450 MW. Expansion plans could result in 183 MW additional capacity in the period 2006-2014 (a 121% increase in the next 7 years), with projects to be developed in Ahuachapán (25 MW), Berlín (50 MW), San Vicente (54 MW) and Chinameca (54 MW).

== History of the electricity sector ==
=== Early history ===
Until the mid-1990s, the power sector in Salvador operated through the government owned Comisión Hidroeléctrica del Río Lempa (CEL), which provided generation, transmission and distribution services. The electricity sector restructuring that led to the unbundling of electricity generation, transmission and distribution and the horizontal division of generation and distribution into several companies was carried out in the period 1996-2000. The Electricity Law (Legislative decree No.843) and its secondary legislation were enacted in 1996 and 1997 respectively through initiatives led by the Electrical Energy Directorate (DEE) within the Ministry of Economy (MINEC). The General Superintendence for Electricity and Telecommunications (SIGET) was created as part of the reform and assigned the responsibility of applying the sector laws and monitoring compliance with them.

The electricity Law in El Salvador affords a high degree of liberty to market agents. Article 8 explicitly authorizes vertical integration in generation, transmission, distribution and supply. The only limitation consists of prohibiting generation, distribution and supply companies from owning shares in Etesal (Empresa Transmisora de El Salvador, S.A. de C.V.), the transmission company that resulted from the restructuring of CEL. Such an allowance, together with the organization of a price-based spot market, is surprising in a small system with few operators.

=== 21st century developments ===
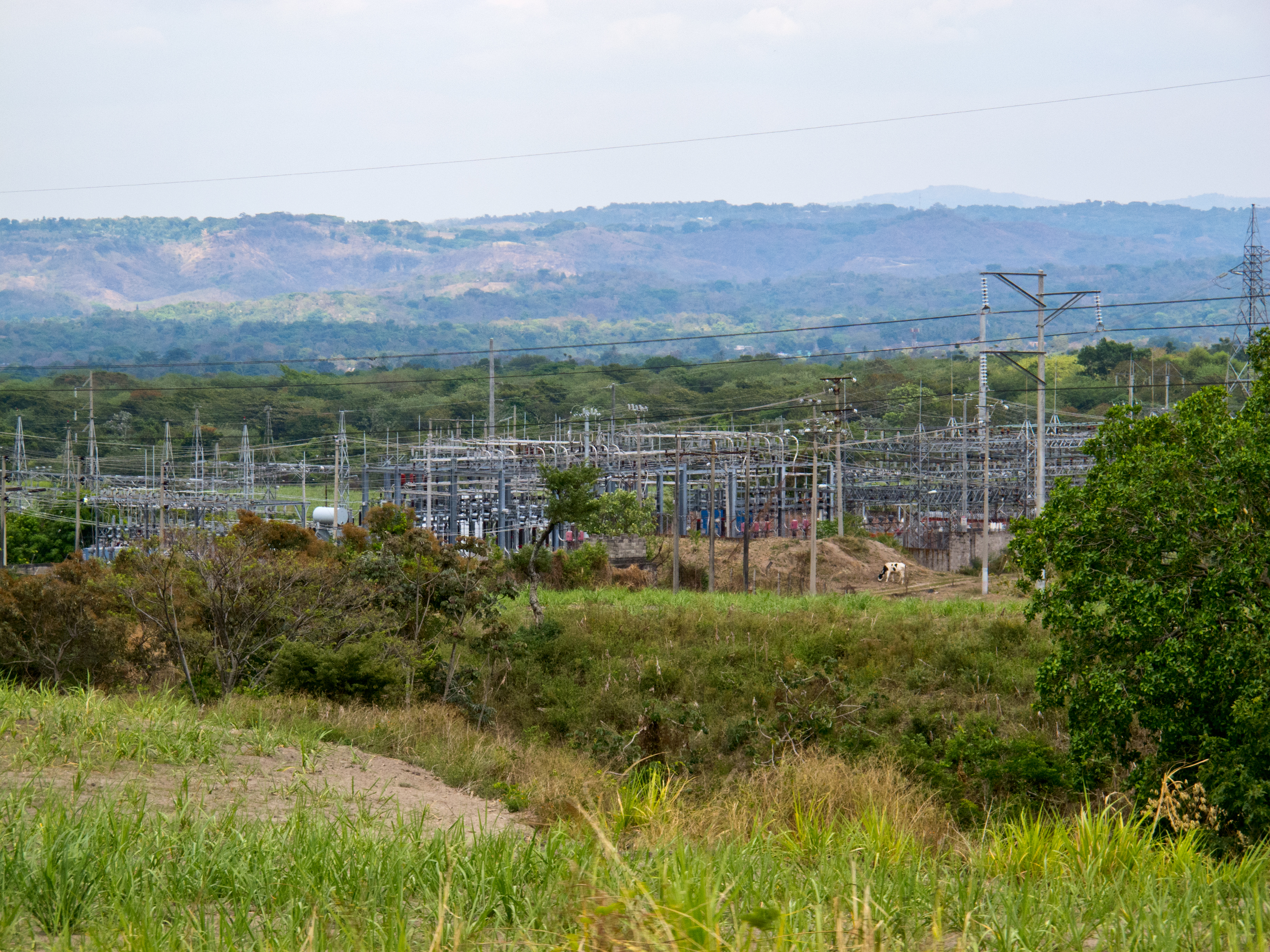
An electrical substation north of San Salvador, near Nejapa

The remuneration of generators in the spot market did not generate interest from private producers to obtain high returns and therefore install new capacity. As a result, the Government was concerned with the possibility that a lack of new generation capacity could lead both to higher spot prices and higher tariffs, lower reserve margins and eventually lead to a supply crisis in which it could be forced to invest in the sector. In order to address this problem, in 2003 and 2004, the Government instituted rules for allowing competitively bid long-term contract prices to be reflected in consumer tariffs and empowered the regulator to shift to a cost-based market if evidence of market manipulation emerged.

In July 2005, as a result of the high international oil prices, the government created the National Emergency Committee to Address High Oil Prices in an attempt to analyze and promote measures to minimize impacts. This Committee promoted certain specific actions such as the spreading out working schedules to reduce vehicle traffic. Less than one year after the creation of the Committee, the necessity to broaden its scope of action was acknowledged, which led to the creation, in July 2006, of the National Energy Council (CNE). The CNE will propose, manage and contribute to the agencies in charge of approving energy strategies that participate in the country's socio-economic development in harmony with the environment.

In May 2007, the Salvadoran government produced its National Energy Policy, whose main objectives are: (i) ensuring proper, continuous, quality and reasonably priced energy supply; (ii) reduce vulnerability in energy provision through diversification of the country's energy sources; (iii) minimize environmental impacts; and (iv) increase energy services coverage to the population and to the economic sectors. The specific objectives and strategic lines of the National Energy Policy include: (i) diversification and increase of energy sources; (ii) expansion of coverage; (iii) promotion of market efficiency and establishment of clear and stable rules; (iii) promotion of energy efficiency; and (iv) support for energy integration.

Since November 2007 the Salvadoran government has been evaluating a Natural Gas law, since Natural Gas is not included nor regulated under the current Hydrocarbons Law. This move has been propitiated because of a new large-scale natural gas project being developed by Cutuco Energy Central America. This project will use Natural Gas to generate 525 MW, more than half of what is currently generated in El Salvador.

In 2023, El Salvador began plans to open a nuclear power plant. In October 2024, it approved the Nuclear Energy Law. It plans to open a nuclear power plant by 2030.

=== Regional integration, the SIEPAC project ===
In 1995, after almost a decade of preliminary studies, the Central American governments, the government of Spain and the Inter-American Development Bank agreed to the execution of the SIEPAC project. This project, together with the Plan Puebla Panama aims at the electric integration of the region. Feasibility studies showed that the creation of a regional transmission system would be very positive for the region and lead to a reduction in electricity costs and to improvements in the continuity and reliability of supply. In 1996, the six countries (Panama, Honduras, Guatemala, Costa Rica, Nicaragua and El Salvador) signed the Framework Treaty for the Electricity Market in Central America.

The design of the Regional Electricity Market (MER) was done in 1997 and approved in 2000. MER is an additional market superimposed on the existing six national markets, with a regional regulation, in which the agents authorized by the Regional Operational Body (EOR) carry out international electricity transactions in the region. As for the infrastructure, EPR (Empresa Propietaria de la Red S.A.) is in charge of the design, engineering, and construction of about 1,800 km of 230kV transmission lines. The project is expected to be operational by the end of 2008.

(For a map of the regional transmission line, see SIEPAC)

== Tariffs and subsidies ==
=== Tariffs ===
Electricity prices are regulated by SIGET. They comprise generation, transmission, distribution, and supply components. In 2005, the average residential tariff in El Salvador was US$0.139 per kWh, which is above the US$0.105 per kWh weighted average for LAC. In contrast, the average industrial tariff for El Salvador, US$0.103 per kWh was below the US$0.107 per kWh average for LAC.

Electricity prices vary considerably from one distribution company to another. Small (high cost) consumers have high prices and larger (lower cost) consumers have lower prices. This is an indication that tariffs in El Salvador reflect costs better than those in other countries.

=== Subsidies ===
For residential users with consumption levels below 100 kWh, 86% of the difference between the full tariff and the maximum prices established in November 1999 is subsidized. Those maximum prices are:

- US$0.0640 per kWh for monthly consumption between 1kWh and 50kWh
- US$0.0671 per kWh for monthly consumption between 50kWh and 99kWh

In 2006, according to the available data, 809,536 users (i.e. 60.6% of the clients connected the distribution network) were subsidized. Together, these consumers accounted for 10.6% of the total energy demand at the distribution level.

== Investment and financing ==
Expansion plan requirements include, in addition to generation additions, transmission investments (including 230kV lines that link with the SIEPAC interconnection) and distribution investments, including rural electrification. Investment requirements for the period 2005-2009 were estimated as follows:

($US million)	Total	Public	Private	Public/ Private
Generation	298	8	84	206
Transmission	47	47		
Distribution	84		84	
Rural electrification	101	83	18	
TOTAL	530	138	186	206

Source: World Bank 2006

Public/private partnerships constitute the major source of financing for generation. They include investments in geothermal facilities through La Geo and its strategic investor, which are likely to go ahead; other investments in this category include the Chaparral power plant ($143 million). It is also important to note that these estimates are just for investments required within El Salvador. They do not take into account financing required for the 300 MW of firm generation capacity assumed to be available from regional sources through the SIEPAC line.

=== Rural electrification ===
The budgeted investment in rural electrification during 2004-2009 amounts to around US$100 million, financed as summarized in the following table:

($US million)	Government	Municipalities	Distribution companies	Total
Isolated systems	12	9.6	2.4	24
New lines	28.8	28.8	14.4	72
Substations	3.8		1.3	5
TOTAL	44.6	38.4	18.1	101

Source: World Bank 2006

Rural electrification projects are executed mainly through the Social Investment Fund for Local Development (FISDL), in operation since 1990. The FISDL has executed a large number of projects totaling over US$400 million, although it has faced obstacles to achieve its goals, mainly due to a lack of secure financing.

One of the most ambitious projects for rural electrification will be carried out during the next 5 years in the North of the country through a co-investment project of the Government with the Millennium Challenge Account (MCA) in 94 municipalities. The goal of the project is to increase service coverage from the current 78% to 97% in 2012. Total investment required has been estimated at US$40 million. This project will be implemented through the Electricity and Telephone National Investment Fund (FINET). According to the FINET Creating Law, resources for the construction and improvement of electrical infrastructure will be granted through the auctioning of subsidies. For the allocation of funds to implement this rural electrification sub-activity, electricity distribution companies, authorized by the Electricity and Telecommunications Superintendence (SIGET) will be able to participate.

== Summary of private participation in the electricity sector ==
Until the mid-1990s, the power sector in Salvador operated through the government owned Comisión Hidroeléctrica del Río Lempa (CEL), which provided generation, transmission and distribution services. The electricity sector restructuring that led to the unbundling of electricity generation, transmission and distribution and the horizontal division of generation and distribution into several companies was carried out in the period 1996-2000.

In 2006, there were 11 generation companies in El Salvador, with 18 out of 22 generation plants in private hands and 97% of hydroelectric capacity owned by the public company CEL (Comisión Hidroeléctrica del Río Lempa). As for transmission, it is in the hands of one government-owned company, Etesal (Empresa Transmisora de El Salvador), while distribution is controlled by five privately owned companies.

Activity	Private participation (%)
Generation	65% of installed capacity
Transmission	0%
Distribution	100%

== Electricity and the environment ==
=== Responsibility for the environment ===
The Ministry of Environment and Natural Resources (MARN) is the institution in charge of the conservation, protection and sustainable use of the natural resources and the environment.

=== Greenhouse gas emissions ===
OLADE (Latin American Energy Association) estimated that CO_{2} emissions from electricity production in 2003 were 1.57 million tons of CO_{2}, which corresponds to 25% of total emissions from the energy sector.

=== CDM projects in electricity ===
Currently (November 2007), there are three registered CDM projects in the electricity sector in El Salvador, with overall estimated emission reductions of 385,553 tCO_{2}e per year. One of the projects is a landfill gas project, another one a bagasse cogeneration project and the third one a geothermal plant project.

== External assistance ==
=== Inter-American Development Bank ===
The Inter-American Development Bank (IDB) is currently providing technical assistance to El Salvador in several electricity-related initiatives:

- Support for the Implementation of the Country Energy Policy: US$149,000
- Power Sector Generation Indicative Planning: US$145,000
- Studies on Dam Safety for Hydroelectric Power Plants: US$200,000

== See also ==
- Economy of El Salvador
- Water supply and sanitation in El Salvador
- Geothermal power in El Salvador
- Renewable energy by country

== Sources ==
- World Bank, 2002.
- CEPAL, 2007. Istmo Centroamericano: Estadísticas del Subsector Eléctrico
- Gobierno de El Salvador, 2007. Política Energética
- SIGET, 2007. Boletín de Estadísticas Eléctricas 2006
- World Bank, 2006. El Salvador - Recent Economic Developments in Infrastructure (REDI)
