= Lake Apanás =

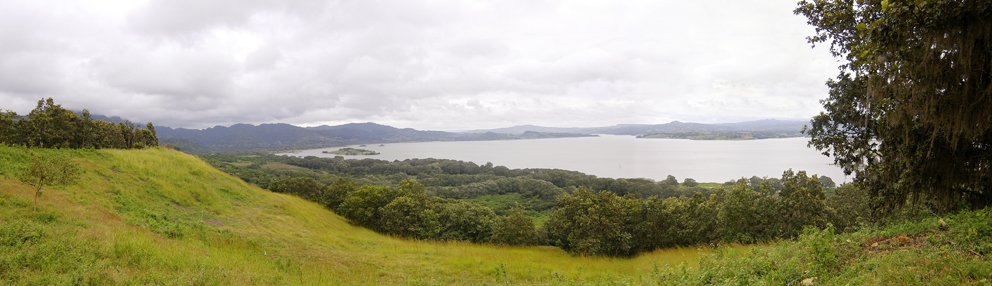

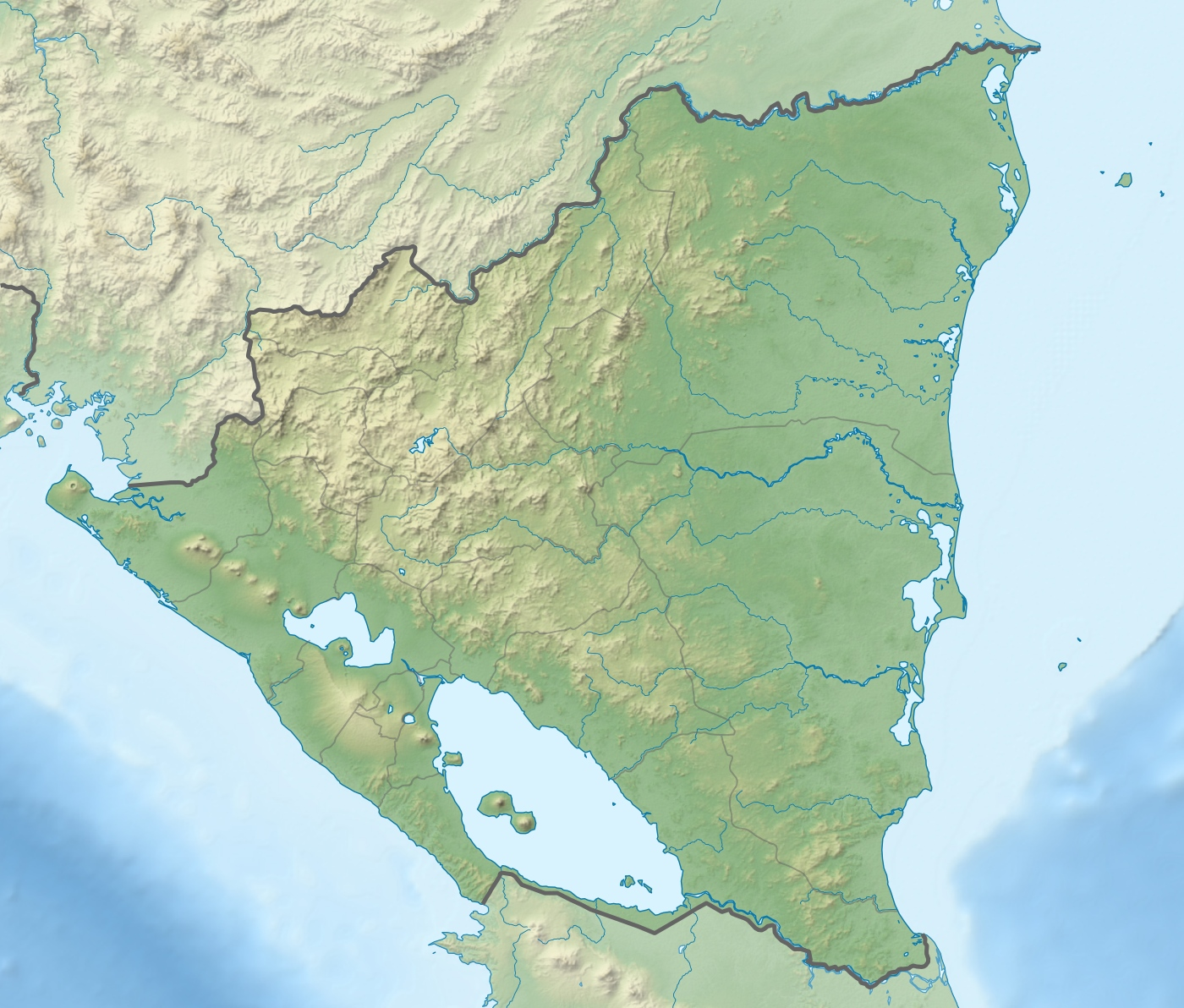
- Location within Nicaragua
- Location: Jinotega, Nicaragua
- Coordinates: 13°11′40″N 85°58′35″W
- Type: reservoir
- Primary inflows: Tuma River
- Primary outflows: Tuma River
- Basin countries: Nicaragua
- Surface area: 45.90 km^{2} (17.72 sq mi)

Ramsar Wetland
- Official name: Lago de Apanás-Asturias
- Designated: 8 November 2001
- Reference no.: 1137

Lake Apanás is a reservoir located in northern Nicaragua and formed by Mancotal Dam on the Tuma River to the north of Jinotega department (border with Honduras). The reservoir has an area of 45.90 square kilometres.

It is a source of much of nation's hydropower for the Centro América Power Plant.
