= Wawa River (Nicaragua) =

River in Nicaragua

Coordinates: 14°13′38″N 83°34′43″W

The Wawa River (Spanish pronunciation: [ˈwawa]), also known as Rio Wawa or Rio Hauhau, is a river located in the North Caribbean Coast Autonomous Region of Nicaragua that drains to the Caribbean Sea. It flows southeast through northeast Nicaragua to the Mosquito Coast (or Miskito Coast) region. The river joins Laguna de Karata, south of Puerto Cabezas, before exiting to the Caribbean Sea.

== See also ==
- List of rivers of Nicaragua
