= Tuma River =

Coordinates: 13°03′47″N 84°44′32.29″W

Tuma

Location
- Country: Nicaragua

Physical characteristics
- Mouth
  - location: Río Grande de Matagalpa
- Length: 180 km (110 mi)

The Tuma River is a river located in Nicaragua. The length of the Tuma is 180 kilometres (110 mi).

The river, a left tributary of the Río Grande de Matagalpa, is located in the Jinotega and Matagalpa Departments, North Caribbean Coast Autonomous Region, and South Caribbean Coast Autonomous Region. The source of the Tuma River is located in Jinotega Department, about 250 kilometers northeast of the capital, Managua. The river flows in the eastern direction, crosses into Matagalpa Department, in the lower course forms the border between Matagalpa Department and the North Caribbean Coast Autonomous Region, and between the North Caribbean Coast Autonomous Region and the South Caribbean Coast Autonomous Region where it joins Río Grande de Matagalpa.

The biggest towns on the banks of the Tuma are El Tuma in Matagalpa Department and Mulukuku in the North Caribbean Coast Autonomous Region.

In 1964, President Luis Somoza Debayle decided to dam the river with the Mancotal Dam to form Nicaragua's first man-made lake, Apanás Lake, which provides power for the 50-megawatt Centroamérica hydroelectric plant in the country's Central Highlands. It is also an important recreational area, as the river and lake provide a good deal of tourism for Jinotega department.

== See also ==
- Hydroelectricity in Nicaragua
