= Río Grande de Matagalpa =

Río grande de Matagalpa
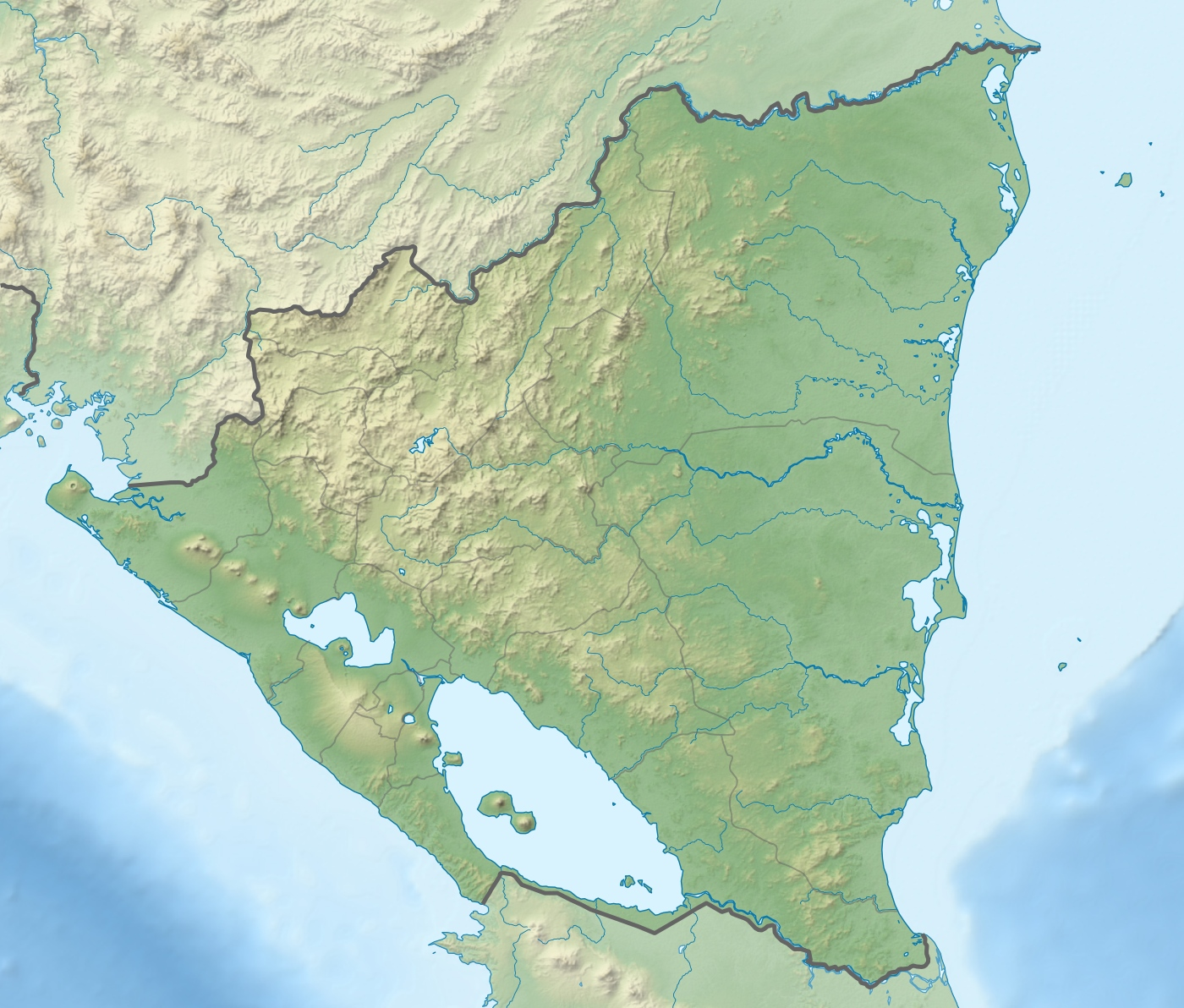
- Location of mouth

Location
- Country: Nicaragua

Physical characteristics
- Source
  - location: Selva Negra, Matagalpa
- Mouth
  - location: South Caribbean Autonomous Region
  - coordinates: 12°54′N 83°32′W
- Length: 267 mi (430 km)

Río Grande de Matagalpa (Spanish pronunciation: [mataˈɣalpa], Awaltara in Miskito, Ucumulalí in Matagalpa) is a river of Nicaragua. Running 430 kilometers (270 mi) from its source near Matagalpa to the Caribbean Sea in the northern part of the South Caribbean Autonomous Region it is the second longest river in Nicaragua. It gives it name to the city and municipality of La Cruz de Río Grande. The Tumarín Dam is being constructed on its lower reaches.
