= List of companies of Nicaragua =

Location of Nicaragua

Nicaragua is the largest country in the Central American isthmus. Nicaragua's capital, Managua, is the country's largest city and the third-largest city in Central America. Nicaragua is primarily an agricultural country; agriculture constitutes 60% of its total exports which annually yield approximately US $300 million. Nearly two-thirds of the coffee crop comes from the northern part of the central highlands, in the area north and east of the town of Estelí. Yields and exports have both been declining since 1985. Today most of Nicaragua's bananas are grown in the northwestern part of the country near the port of Corinto; sugarcane is also grown in the same district. Cassava, a root crop somewhat similar to the potato, is an important food in tropical regions. Cassava is also the main ingredient in tapioca pudding. Nicaragua's agricultural sector has benefited because of the country's strong ties to Venezuela. It is estimated that Venezuela will import approximately $200 million in agricultural goods. In the 1990s, the government initiated efforts to diversify agriculture. Some of the new export-oriented crops were peanuts, sesame, melons, and onions.

Mining is becoming a major industry in Nicaragua, contributing less than 1% of gross domestic product (GDP).

== Notable firms ==
This list includes notable companies with primary headquarters located in the country. The industry and sector follow the Industry Classification Benchmark taxonomy. Organizations which have ceased operations are included and noted as defunct.

Notable companies Status: P=Private, S=State; A=Active, D=Defunct
Name	Industry	Sector	Headquarters	Founded	Notes	Status	
Aeronica	Consumer services	Airlines	Managua	1981	Airline, defunct 1992	P	D
Aerosegovia	Consumer services	Airlines	Managua	1994	Charter airline, defunct 2003	P	D
Atlantic Airlines	Consumer services	Airlines	Managua	1997	Airline, defunct 2007	P	D
Avianca Nicaragua	Consumer services	Airlines	Managua	1999	Airline, formerly La Costeña	P	A
BAC Credomatic	Financials	Banks	Managua	1952	Part of Grupo Aval Acciones y Valores (Colombia)	P	A
Banco de la Producción	Financials	Banks	Managua	1991	Bank	P	A
Banco del Cafe	Financials	Banks	Managua	1978	Defunct 2001	P	D
Compañía Cervecera de Nicaragua	Consumer goods	Brewers	Managua	1926	Brewery	P	A
ECAMI	Oil & gas	Alternative energy	Managua	1982	Renewable energy, wind, solar	P	A
El Castillo del Cacao	Consumer goods	Food products	Matiguás	2005	Chocolate	P	A
Flor de Caña	Consumer goods	Distillers & vintners	Managua	1890	Rum	P	A
Gelateria Italiana	Consumer goods	Food products	Managua	2010	Ice cream	P	A
Joya de Nicaragua	Consumer goods	Tobacco	Estelí	1968	Cigars	P	A
Kola Shaler Industrial	Consumer goods	Soft drinks	Managua	1904	Soft drinks	P	A
Nicaragüense de Aviación	Consumer services	Airlines	Managua	2002	Commercial airline, defunct 2004	P	D
Selva Negra Mountain Resort	Consumer services	Hotels	Matagalpa	1976	Resort	P	A
Tip-Top Restaurant	Consumer services	Restaurants & bars	Managua	1959	Restaurant	P	A

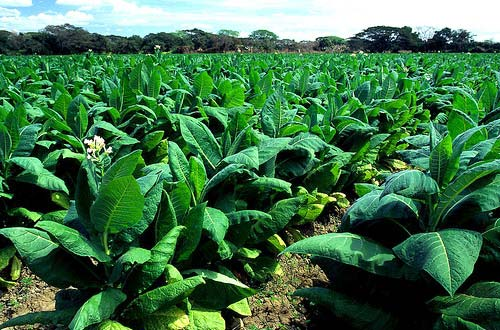
Tobacco plantation near Estelí.

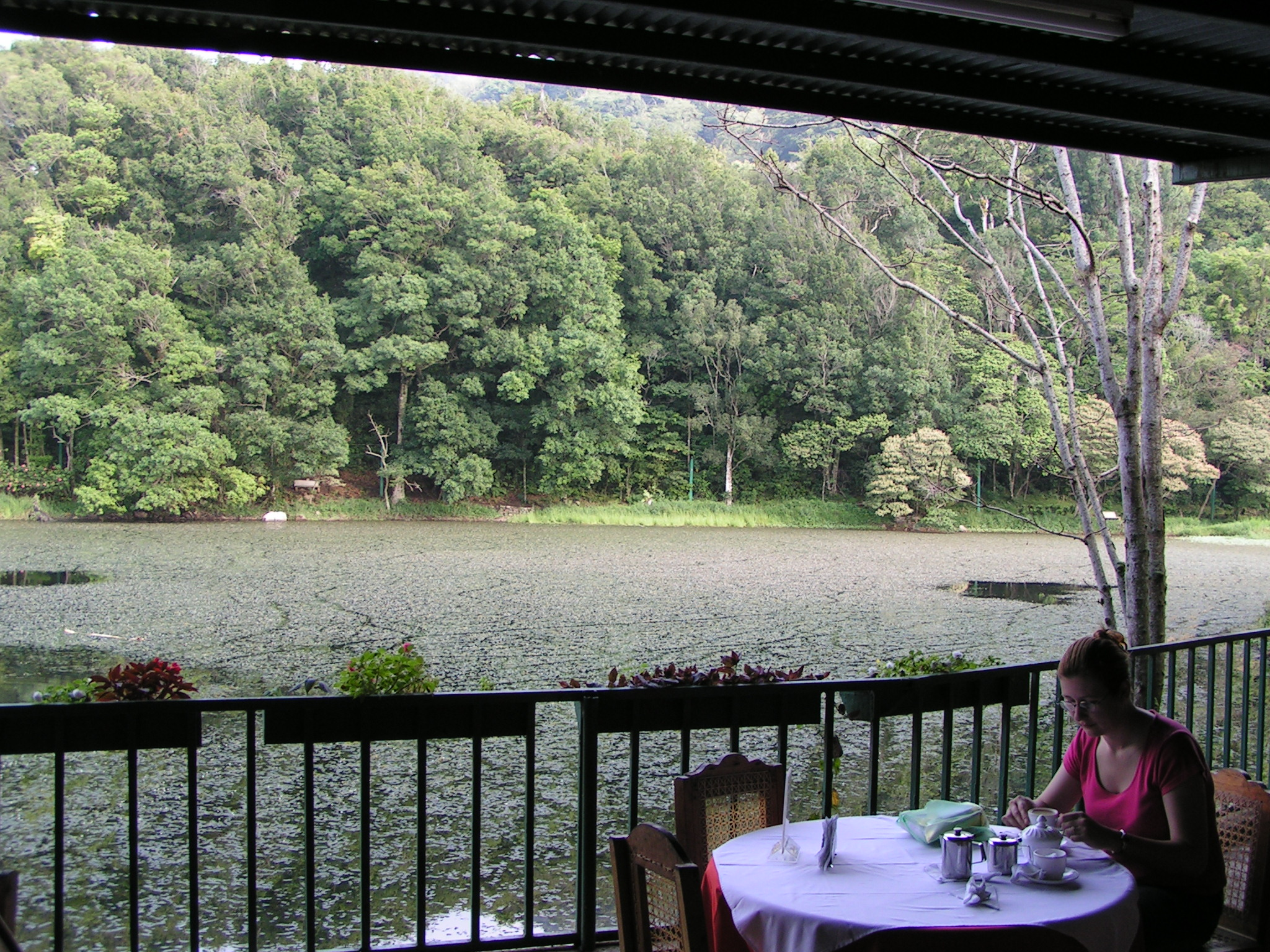
Visitor at Selva Negra Mountain Resort.

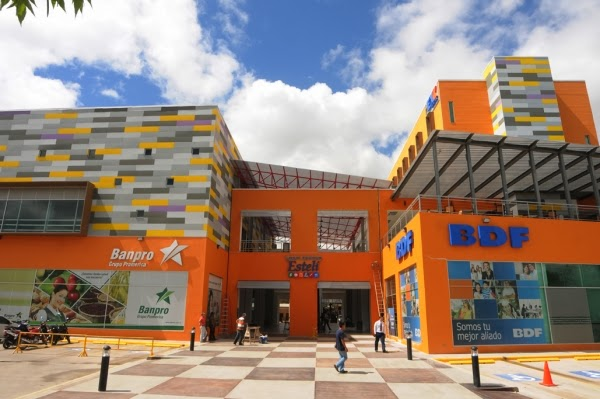
Multicentro Estelí in Estelí.
