= List of banks in Nicaragua =

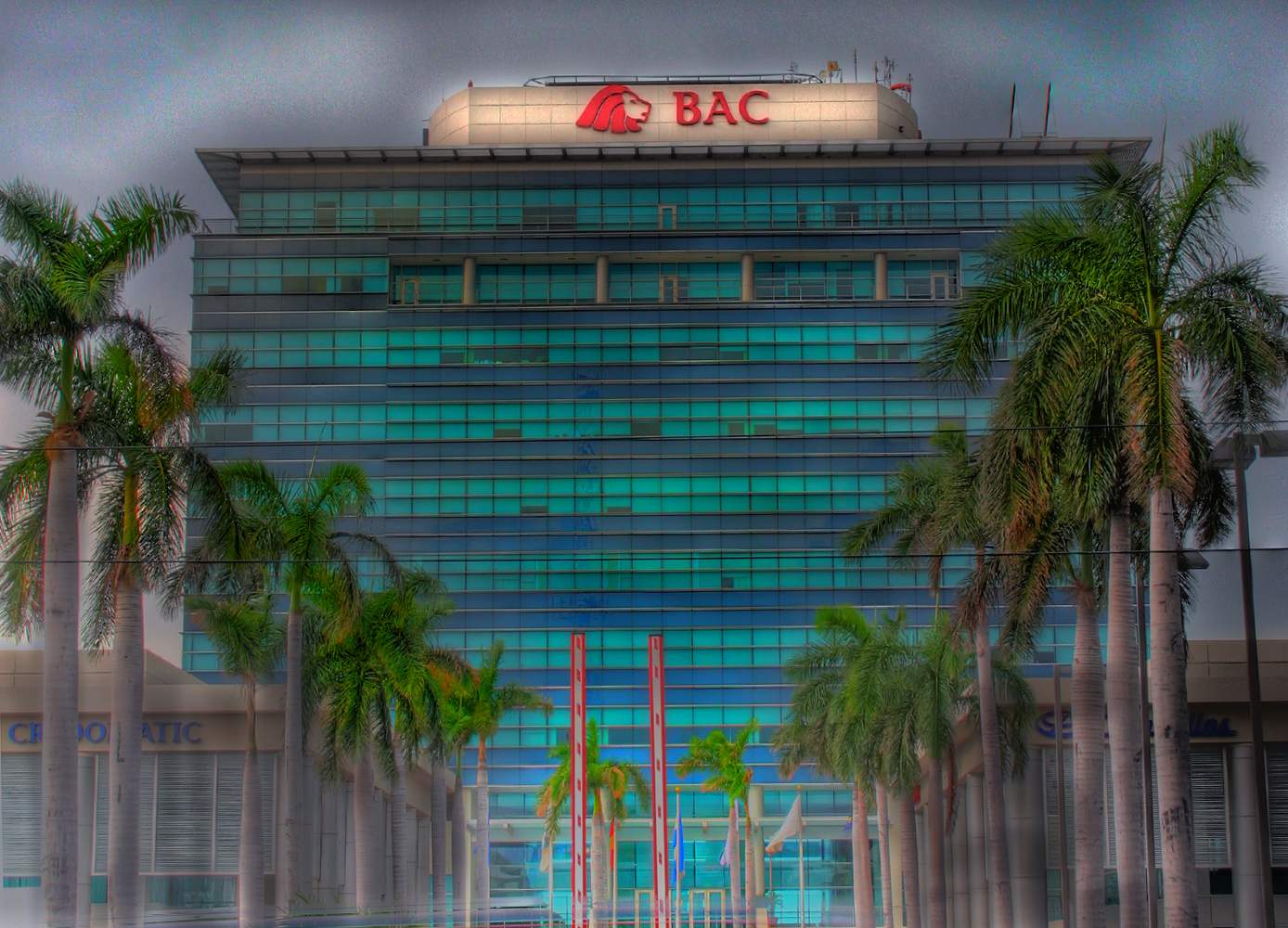
The building of the Banco de América Central (BAC) in Managua.

This is a list of banks in Nicaragua, including credit unions and other financial services companies that offer banking services and may be popularly referred to as "banks".

== History ==
The two first commercial banks in Nicaragua opened in 1888. The Bank of Nicaragua (Spanish: Banco de Nicaragua), later rebranded as the Bank of Nicaragua Limited, headquartered in London and then merged with the London Limited Bank of Central America, and the Mercantil Agricultural Bank (Spanish: Banco Agrícola Mercantil) that went bankrupt for non-payment of their debtors.

In 1911, the Government of Nicaragua granted a concession to the investment bank Brown Bros. & Co. from New York in order to establish a banking corporation with shared ownership, both from the Republic of Nicaragua and the North American bankers, which would operate under the laws of the United States of America.

The following year, the National Bank of Nicaragua, Incorporated (Spanish: Banco Nacional de Nicaragua, Incorporado) opened its doors in the capital city of Managua. In addition to regular banking services, the National Bank of Nicaragua was the only bank authorised to issue banknotes for the Republic of Nicaragua.

== List of banks ==
=== Central bank ===
- Central Bank of Nicaragua

=== Government-owned banks ===
- Banco de Fomento a la Producción (Produzcamos)

=== Commercial banks ===
- BAC Credomatic
- Banco de la Producción
- Banco Lafise Bancentro
- Banco Avanz
- Banco de Finanzas (BDF)

=== Foreign banks ===
- Banco Ficohsa, Honduras
- Banco Atlántida, Honduras

=== Defunct or merged or acquired banks ===
- Banco del Café
- Citi, United States of America
- Banco Procredit, Germany
- BanCorp, Albanisa-owned bank that closed in 2019

=== Credit Unions and other Financial Institutions ===
- Caja Rural Nacional (CARUNA)
- Financiera FAMA

== See also ==
- Banking in Nicaragua
