= Banking in Nicaragua =

Banking in Nicaragua refers to its financial system, which includes private and state-owned banks, microfinance institutions, financial cooperatives, and insurance providers. All institutions are regulated by the Superintendency of Banks and Other Financial Institutions (SIBOIF), which makes sure there compliance with domestic laws and international standards. The Nicaraguan banking sector has faced many changes and significant restructuring, marked by nationalization, liberalization, and regulatory reforms. It is currently considered stable, with banks remaining well-capitalized and liquid.

Remittances play an important role in Nicaragua's economy and financial system, since they account for over a quarter of the country's GDP in recent years. However, the banking structure has been affected by political developments, U.S. sanctions, and new domestic legislation, influencing the structure and independence of the banking sector.

== Economy of Nicaragua ==
Main Article: Economy of Nicaragua

=== Economic Situation ===
Nicaragua is currently the second poorest country in Latin America. This is mostly because of poor fiscal policies, high unemployment, and external debt. However, Economic growth in Nicaragua accelerated in 2023 and continued to strengthen in the first half of 2024 because of domestic demand. In 2024, real GDP surpassed potential output growth and it was supported by a recovery in private investment. Real GDP growth increased from 3.8% in 2022 to 4.6% in 2023. This was caused by high remittance inflows, stable employment, and rising consumer credit. Net exports saw a lower export volume, specially in coffee, but economic activity retail, hotels, and restaurants remained strong.

=== Agriculture ===
Nicaragua has historically depended on agriculture as its main economic sector. It also employs a significant part of the population, especially in rural areas. Economic disparities have increased during periods of agricultural difficulties, caused by natural disasters. Additionally, limited access to modern farming technology has caused challenges and disadvantages for those working in agriculture. Some argue that the government should grant financial assistance to farmers based on their scale of production, but this has not been accomplished.

=== Economic Vulnerability ===
Nicaragua is a country susceptible to hurricanes, droughts, and storms while also being highly dependent on agriculture. Variations in temperature and precipitation directly impact per capita consumption. There is a negative relationship between climate variability and household consumption, which implies poverty, proving that climate shocks such as El Niño increase poverty rates.

=== Poverty and Inequality ===
Nicaragua's poverty rate (income of less than $3.65 per day) declined from 14% in 2014 to 12.5% at the end of 2023, according to the World Bank. However, this is an estimate since data on poverty is limited since the last official statistics were released in 2014. The government and other institutions are looking for poverty reduction through investment in infrastructure, social programs, and increased labor force participation. Additionally, income inequality is still relatively high, with a Gini coefficient of 46.2 in 2014. In that year the richest 10% of the population controlled 37.2% of total income, and the disparities in wealth distribution have continued.

=== Tourism ===
Tourism is one of the main sources of income in Nicaragua, it has contributed to economic development and is still a growing sector.

=== International Investment ===
The Free Trade Agreement (2006) increased the GDP per capita by opening opportunities for businesses. Organizations like the IMF and World Bank have also provided economic support.

=== Remittances ===
Remittances account for a big part of the economy. In 2022, remittances reached $3,547 million, 23% of GDP, making them the main driver of economic growth though domestic consumption and macroeconomic stability. However, remittance flows are slowing and there is no significant increase in trade or borrowing, so economic growth is likely to start decreasing. The increased flow in remittances, rising 30% in 2022, was a direct result of mass migration following the April 2018 crisis, and it intensified with the April 2021 legal measures criminalizing democratic activity. Between 122,000 and 200,000 Nicaraguans are expected to migrate, and almost half of them are expected to send money back during their first year abroad. Remittances are expected to keep growing but at a lower pace, which may impact private consumption and savings in the coming years. In 2023, remittances increased to 26.1% of GDP, reinforcing Nicaragua's position being the most remittance-dependent country in Latin America considering the size of its economy. These inflows have improved the overall economy since they have boosted foreign reserves and supported household consumption. However, a large share of these remittances is spent on household consumption rather than investment, minimizing their effect on long-term economic sustainability. The increase in remittances has also caused the real exchange rate to appreciate, which is predicted can negatively impact the competitiveness of tradable goods exports.

=== Effects of the 2018 Sociopolitical Crisis ===
Poverty increased by 6.5% after 2018, contradicting the information provided by the government. This indicates that the crisis reversed years of economic progress, it directly caused a decline in employment and a rise in poverty.

== History ==
=== 1880 ===
Nicaragua's banking system began in 1888 with Banco de Nicaragua and Banco Agrícola Mercantil.

=== 1911-1912 ===
The government granted Brown Brothers & Company the power to create Banco Nacional de Nicaragua (Nicaraguan National Bank). It was created in 1912 and functioned as the central and commercial bank.

=== 1940 ===
The Banco Nacional de Nicaragua (Nicaraguan National Bank) was fully nationalized. The Superintendency of Banks was established as there were more private and foreign banks. It focused on regulating all financial institutions.

=== 1950s–1970s ===
The banking sector expanded with the creation of new private banks (Banco Nicaragüense, Banco de América) and foreign institutions (Citibank, Bank of America). The Superintendency of Banks expanded and became the main regulatory body, which oversaw commercial banks, savings and loans, and insurance companies.

=== 1979-1985 ===
After the revolution, when the Sandinista government got into power in 1979, they attempted to nationalize the country's banking system (Decree No. 25 of 1979) as part of their project to aid the poor in rural areas. They did this under the National Financial System. State institutions like Corporación Financiera (CORFIN) controlled financial assets, and regulatory functions were transferred to the General Comptroller's Office. All banking institutions became state-owned, including the Banco Nacional de Desarrollo, Banco de Crédito Popular, Banco Nicaragüense, Banco de América, and Banco Inmobiliario. New institutions were incorporated to manage the nationalized sectors of production. Foreign banks were allowed to continue their operations but could no longer accept local deposits. The Central Bank adopted an expansionary monetary policy, leading to rapid credit growth. Reserve requirements for banks were removed, increasing the money supply significantly. The banking system went from being conservative and driven by the private sector, to a state-controlled expansionary model.

=== 1985-1989 ===
In 1985, a new decree loosened state control of the banking system by allowing the establishment of privately owned local exchange houses. Then in 1988, the government created its largest exchange house under the direction of the Financial Corporation of Nicaragua (Corporación Financiera de Nicaragua - Corfin).In 1989 the Central Bank authorized the exchange house to operate a foreign money exchange office as an agent of the bank.

=== 1990-2000s ===
In 1990, the National Assembly passed legislation permitting private banks to resume operations. In 1991 a legislation allowed the establishment of the first private banks in the country, however only large industries and agribusiness producers of non-traditional crops for export qualified for credit thus leaving small business owners and producers of consumption crops with no access to loans or banking services.

In 1992, the largest stateowned commercial bank was the National Development Bank (Banco Nacional de Desarrollo - BND), originally established by Chase National Bank. Other state-owned commercial banks were the Bank of America (Banco de América - Bamer) and the Nicaraguan Bank of Industry and Commerce (Banco Nicaragüense de Industria y Comercio - Banic). The People's Bank (Banco Popular) specialized in business loans, and the Real Estate Bank (Banco Inmobilario - Bin) provided loans for housing. Three foreign banks continued operations: Bank of America, Citibank, and Lloyds Bank.

In December 1991, the Inter-American Development Bank (IDB) approved a US$3 million technical cooperation grant to restructure the Central Bank, and in March 1992, it approved a US$3 million loan to a new commercial bank, the Mercantile Bank (Banco Mercantil). The Mercantile Bank program was expected to make loans available to small and medium-sized private-sector enterprises and to finance investments to bolster fixed assets and create permanent working capital. The Mercantile Bank was the first private bank to be established in Nicaragua since 1979. Three additional new commercial banks were scheduled to open in 1992.

Restructuring of the National Financial System (Sistema Financiero Nacional - SFN) was one of the key elements of the government's economic reform program. According to an agreement between President Chamorro and the World Bank, Banic was to be merged with Bin. The BND would handle only rural credit operations, and the People's Bank was to take over all credit operations for small and medium-sized industry. International operations, which had been managed exclusively by the Central Bank since 1984, were transferred to the BND and Banic. The Central Bank would continue to handle operations pertaining to the central government, while the newly merged banks would be responsible for letters of credit, imports, transfers, and dollar checking accounts.

The Central Bank also auctioned off one of the government's largest exchange houses. This exchange house had been established in 1988 under the direction of the Financial Corporation of Nicaragua (Corporación Financiera de Nicaragua - Corfin). In 1989 the Central Bank authorized the exchange house to operate a foreign money exchange office as an agent of the bank. In May 1991, Corfin voted to turn over its shares in the exchange house to the Central Bank so that the exchange house could be sold.

Opponents charged that this sale was unconstitutional. They argued that the exchange house was the property of the Central Bank and could not be transferred. The Federation of Bank Workers also charged that the new government banking policy was weakening the state bank while giving the advantage to the private banks. Nicaragua had far fewer banking resources than its Central American counterparts by the end of 2002, with only six banks compared to the regional average of 107 per country.

== Current Banking System ==
The banking system includes:

- Private banks offering commercial and investment services.
- State-Owned Banks focused on economic development and public credit
- Financial Cooperatives and micro finance institutions supporting small enterprises.
- Insurance and Reinsurance Companies offering services to individuals and companies, regulated under modern financial laws.

They are all regulated by the Superintendence of Banks and other financial institutions (SIBOIF). It is in charge of applying global banking standards and ensuring regulatory compliance across the sector.

Overall, the financial sector is stable, with well-capitalized and liquid banks. However, non-performing loans (NPLs) have increased to 1.7 but are still at manageable levels as of 2024. In 2024, authorities focused on financial inclusion and expanding capital markets. They also worked on improving supervision of credit and savings to improve financial stability.

Credit to the private sector has grown steadily in the past years but is still under the pre-crisis levels. In 2024 there was an increase in consumer and commercial lending, so authorities implemented macroprudential measures, such as raising minimum credit card payments and activating countercyclical capital buffers. Foreign exchange (FX) risk remains a concern due to the high level of dollarization despite most borrowers earning income in local currency.

=== Active Banks ===
==== Central Bank ====
- Central Bank of Nicaragua (BCN)

==== State-Owned Bank ====
- Banco de Fomento a la Producción (Created by law No. 640)

==== Private Banks with correspondent relationships with banks in the United States ====
- Banco de la Producción (BANPRO)
- Banco Lafise (BANCENTRO)
- Banco de América Central (BAC)
- Banco de Finanzas (BDF)
- Banco Ficohsa Nicaragua
- Banco Avanz

==== Other Private Banks ====
- Banco Atlántida Nicaragua
- Banco Procredit

=== Financial Consumer Protection Law ===
The Financial Consumer Protection Law (Law N°. 842) describes and outlines the rights of users of financial services and the procedures for filing complaints, inquiries, or disputes. It gives institutions regulatory responsibilities to various institutions based on the type of financial service provider involved:

- The Superintendency of Banks (SIBOIF) supervises complaints involving banks and financial institutions under its regulation.
- The National Microfinance Commission is in charge of cases related to regulated microfinance institutions.
- The Central Bank of Nicaragua is responsible for payment systems, financial technology services, remittances, and currency exchange providers.
- The Ministry of Family, Community, Cooperative, and Associative Economy supervises cooperative financial institutions.
- The Ministry of Development, Industry, and Commerce supervises complaints involving unregulated financial service providers.

=== Effects of the Political Situation ===
Nicaraguan banks' relationship with banks in the US has been impacted by the political crisis, international sanctions on Nicaraguan banks and officials, and the Nicaraguan government's changes to the legislation. The United States government, since 2021 requires local Nicaraguan banks to deny services to "the State" and every sanctioned person and company. Nicaragua is also not allowed to receive financing, loan guarantees, or insurance for exports from the Export-Import Bank of the United States (EXIM Bank).

==== Foreign Agents Law ====
In recent years, the Nicaraguan government has implemented laws that have affected the financial and nonprofit sectors, such as the foreign agents law (Law N°.1040). The law requires individuals and organizations that receive funding from abroad to register with the Ministry of the Interior as "foreign agents." This involves obtaining a certificate by fulfilling reporting and documentation requirements. Then, registered entities have to regularly report on their activities, financial transactions, organizational changes, and planned uses of foreign funds. Without this certification, they are prohibited from conducting financial transactions or maintaining bank accounts. Non-compliance results in fines, loss of legal status, or asset confiscation. The Nicaraguan government put the law in place to defend Nicaragua's national sovereignty, independence, and self-determination. However, it has been criticized by international observers as a tool to consolidate state control over civil society and financial institutions. Over 3,000 nonprofit organizations have been shut down because of accusations of failing to comply with the new legal and financial requirements, with some facing allegations of money laundering.

==== Law for the Protection from External Sanctions and Aggressions ====
The Nicaraguan assembly passed the Law for the Protection from External Sanctions and Aggressions (Law N°. 1224) in 2024. The law was placed to protect national sovereignty, economic stability, and the rights of individuals and institutions from what it calls unilateral coercive measures imposed by foreign states, governments, or organizations. It declares that sanctions have no legal effect in Nicaragua, prohibiting public and private entities from denying goods or services because of the existence of foreign sanctions. Regulatory bodies will impose fines, suspend operations, and place criminal charges like treason, against those who apply or enforce the sanctions in Nicaragua. Sanctioned individuals may ask for restitution and compensation of damages under consumer protection laws. Banking executives who attempted to close accounts linked to sanctioned individuals faced government retaliation, including imprisonment. This law protects politically exposed people, including sanctioned individuals and their relatives from losing access to financial services. However, it has raised concerns about the weakening of financial sector independence and alignment to international banking standards which require banks to comply with the sanctions.

=== Remittances ===
Banks like Banco Lafise, Banpro and BAC Credomatic have focused on expanding its system for receiving remittances. In Lafise customers are currently able to receive remittances from more than 20 remitters. In BAC, customers can receive remittances with no commission. The bank promotes that when customers withdraw their remittance, there is no commission charged for the service. Banpro offers immediate so customers can receive their money on the same day it is sent.

== See also ==
- Nicaragua
- Economy of Nicaragua
- List of banks in Nicaragua
- Demographics of Nicaragua
