= Economy of Nicaragua =

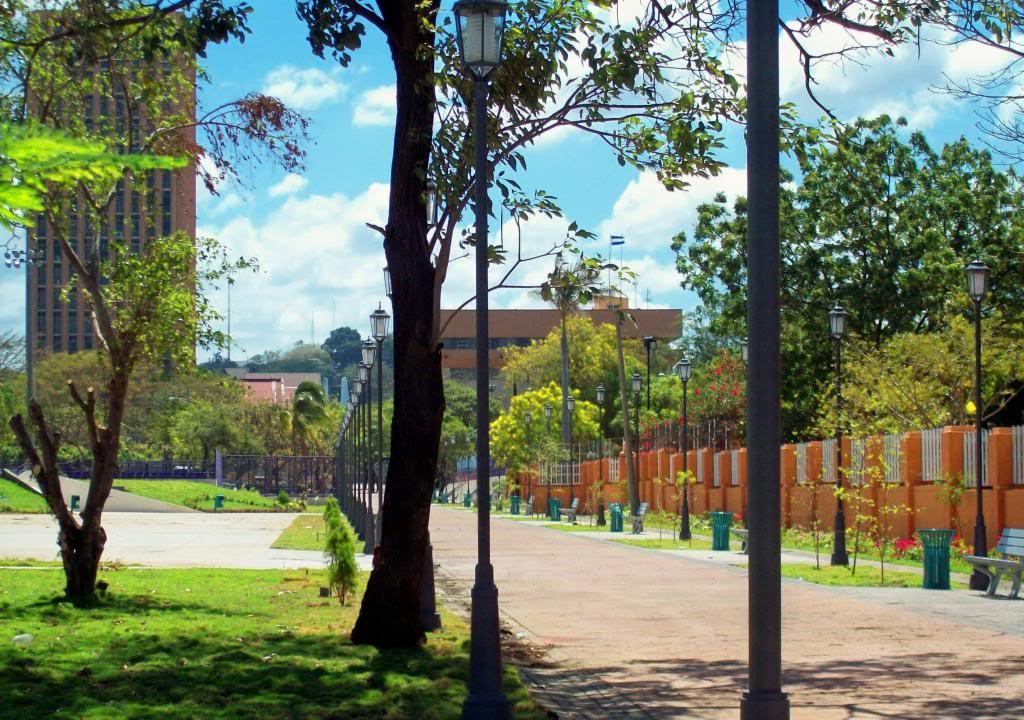
- Currency: Nicaraguan córdoba (NIO, C$)
- Fiscal year: Calendar year
- Trade organizations: WTO, CAFTA-DR
- Country group: Developing/Emerging; Lower-middle income economy

Statistics
- Population: ▲6.75 million (2024)
- GDP: ▲$24.22 billion (nominal, 2026); ▲$69.51 billion (PPP, 2026)
- GDP rank: 124th (nominal, 2026); 121st (PPP, 2026)
- GDP growth: 3.8% (2026)
- GDP per capita: ▲$3,559 (nominal, 2026); ▲$10,211 (PPP, 2026)
- GDP per capita rank: 136th (nominal, 2026); 128th (PPP, 2026)
- GDP per capita growth: 2.2% (2024)
- GDP by sector: agriculture: 15.5%; industry: 24.4%; services: 60%; (2017 est.)
- Inflation (CPI): ▼5% (2024)
- Population below national poverty line: ▼24.9% (2016)
- Gini coefficient: 46.2 high (2016)
- Human Development Index: ▲0.706 high (2023) (123rd); ▲0.535 low IHDI (104th) (2023)
- Labor force: ▲3,264,024 (2023); ▲62.4% (2023)
- Labor force by occupation: agriculture: 31%; industry: 18%; services: 50%; (2011 est.)
- Unemployment: ▼6.8% (2024)
- Main industries: food processing, chemicals, machinery and metal products, knit and woven apparel, petroleum refining and distribution, beverages, footwear, wood, electric wire harness manufacturing, mining

External
- Exports: ▲$6.95 billion (2021)
- Export goods: coffee, beef, gold, sugar, peanuts, shrimp and lobster, tobacco, cigars, automobile wiring harnesses, textiles, apparel
- Main export partners: United States 51.7%; Mexico 11.9%; Honduras 6.83% (2022)
- Imports: ▲$8.65 billion (2021)
- Import goods: consumer goods, machinery and equipment, raw materials, petroleum products
- Main import partners: United States 25.6%; China 11.1%; Honduras 9.56%; Guatemala 9.43%; Mexico 9.36% (2022)
- FDI stock: N/A; Abroad: N/A
- Current account: ▲ −$694 million (2017 est.)
- Gross external debt: ▲$11.31 billion (31 December 2017 est.)

Public finance
- Government debt: ▲33.3% of GDP (2017 est.) (Note: official data; data cover general government debt and include debt instruments issued (or owned) by Government entities other than the treasury; the data include treasury debt held by foreign entities, as well as intragovernmental debt; intragovernmental debt consists of treasury borrowings from surpluses in the social funds, such as retirement, medical care, and unemployment, debt instruments for the social funds are not sold at public auctions; Nicaragua rebased its GDP figures in 2012, which reduced the figures for debt as a percentage of GDP)
- Foreign reserves: ▲$2.758 billion (31 December 2017 est.)
- Budget balance: −2% (of GDP) (2017 est.)
- Revenue: 3.871 billion (2017 est.)
- Spending: 4.15 billion (2017 est.)
- All values, unless otherwise stated, are in US dollars.

The economy of Nicaragua is focused primarily on the agricultural sector. Even so, Nicaragua itself is the least developed country in Central America, and the second least developed in the Americas by nominal GDP, behind only Haiti. In recent years, under the administrations of Daniel Ortega, the Nicaraguan economy has expanded somewhat, following the Great Recession, when the country's economy actually contracted by 1.5%, due to decreased export demand in the American and Central American markets, lower commodity prices for key agricultural exports, and low remittance growth. The economy saw 4.5% growth in 2010 thanks to a recovery in export demand and growth in its tourism industry. Nicaragua's economy continues to post growth, with preliminary indicators showing the Nicaraguan economy growing an additional 5% in 2011. Consumer Price inflation have also curtailed since 2008, when Nicaragua's inflation rate hovered at 19.82%. In 2009 and 2010, the country posted lower inflation rates, 3.68% and 5.45%, respectively. Remittances are a major source of income, equivalent to 15% of the country's GDP, which originate primarily from Costa Rica, the United States, and European Union member states. Approximately one million Nicaraguans contribute to the remittance sector of the economy.

In early 2004, Nicaragua secured some $4.5 billion in foreign debt reduction under the International Monetary Fund and World Bank Heavily Indebted Poor Countries initiative. In April 2006, the US-Central America Free Trade Agreement went into effect, expanding export opportunities for Nicaragua's agricultural and manufactured goods. Textiles and apparel account for nearly 60% of Nicaragua's exports. In October 2007, the IMF approved an additional poverty reduction and growth facility program in support of the government's economic plans. Nicaragua relies on international economic assistance to meet internal- and external-debt financing obligations, although foreign donors curtailed this funding in response to widespread allegations of electoral fraud in Nicaragua's November 2008 elections.

== Economic history ==
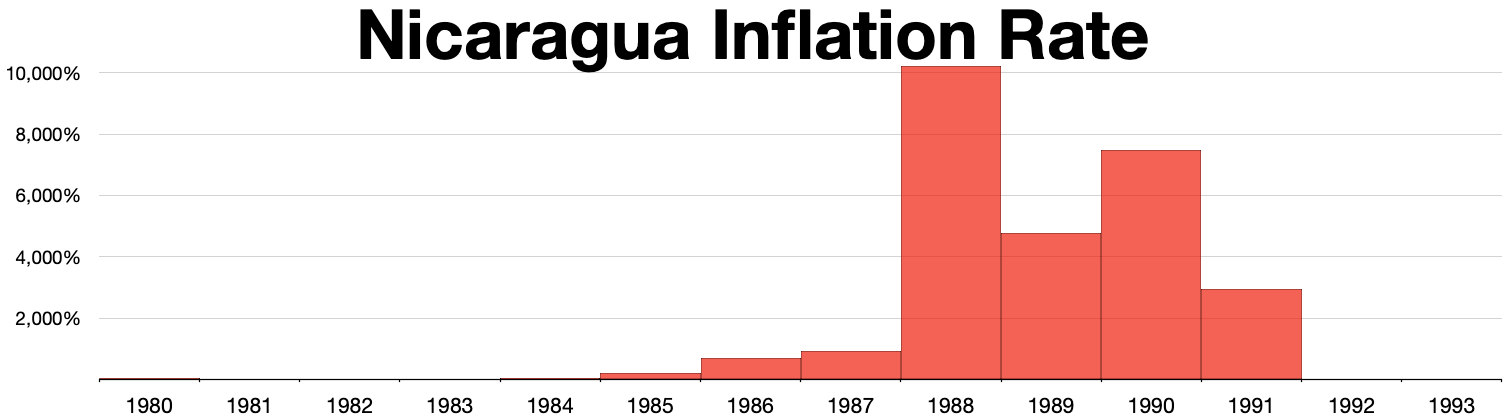
Nicaragua inflation rate 1980-1993

Nicaragua's economy was devastated in the 1980s by the Contra War, which saw the destruction of much of the country's infrastructure. At the same time, the US staged an economic blockade from 1985 onward.

Following the civil war, Nicaragua began free market reforms, privatizing more than 350 state companies and commencing a general trend of economic growth. Inflation has been reduced from 33,603% during the later years of the Sandinista period and 55,000% during the first year of the Chamorro government to more normal levels, averaging an annual rate of 9.5% over the 2000-2010 decade (based on World Bank figures).

Growth was slow (3%) in 2001 due to a combination of factors (a global recession, a series of bank failures, low coffee prices, and a drought), and in 2009 the economy actually contracted 1.5% due to the Great Recession). But even with the recessions, growth has averaged 3.4% between 2001 and 2011 (based on World Bank figures).

Nicaragua suffers from persistent trade and budget deficits and a high debt-service burden, leaving it highly dependent on foreign assistance—which represented almost 25% of GDP in 2001.

One of the key engines of economic growth has been production for export. Although traditional products such as coffee, meat, and sugar continued to lead the list of Nicaraguan exports, the fastest growth is now in nontraditional exports: textile and apparel; gold; seafood; and new agricultural products such as peanuts, sesame, melons, and onions. In 2007, exports topped US$1 billion for the first time in Nicaraguan history.

Nicaragua is primarily an agricultural country, but construction, mining, fisheries, and general commerce also have been expanding during the last few years. Foreign private capital inflows topped $300 million in 1999 but, due to economic and political uncertainty, fell to less than $100 million in 2001. In the last 12 years, tourism has grown 394%, the rapid growth has led it to become Nicaragua's second largest source of foreign capital. Less than three years ago, the nation's tourism budget was U.S. $400,000; today, it is over $2 million. Nicaragua's economy has also produced a construction boom, the majority of which is in and around Managua.

Nicaragua faces a number of challenges in stimulating rapid economic growth. An International Monetary Fund (IMF) program is currently being followed, with the aim of attracting investment, creating jobs, and reducing poverty by opening the economy to foreign trade. This process was boosted in late 2000 when Nicaragua reached the decision point under the Heavily Indebted Poor Countries (HIPC) debt relief initiative. However, HIPC benefits were delayed because Nicaragua subsequently fell "off track" from its IMF program. The country also has been grappling with a string of bank failures that began in August 2000. Moreover, Nicaragua continues to lose international reserves due to its growing fiscal deficits.

The country is still a recovering economy and it continues to implement further reforms, on which aid from the IMF is conditional. In 2005, finance ministers of the leading eight industrialized nations (G8) agreed to forgive some of Nicaragua's foreign debt, as part of the HIPC program. According to the World Bank Nicaragua's GDP was around $4.9 US billion dollars. Recently, in March 2007, Poland and Nicaragua signed an agreement to write off $30.6 million which was borrowed by the Nicaraguan government in the 1980s.

The U.S. is the country's largest trading partner, providing 25% of Nicaragua's imports and receiving about 60% of its exports. About 25 wholly or partly owned subsidiaries of U.S. companies operate in Nicaragua. The largest of those operations are in the energy, communications, manufacturing, fisheries, and shrimp farming sectors. Opportunities exist for expanded foreign investments in those sectors, as well as in tourism, mining, franchising, and the distribution of imported consumer, manufacturing, and agricultural goods. There also are copper mines in northeastern Nicaragua.

Gross Domestic Product (GDP) in purchasing power parity (PPP) in 2012 was estimated at US$20.04 billion, and GDP per capita in PPP at US$3,300, making Nicaragua the second poorest country in the Western Hemisphere. The service sector is the largest component of GDP at 56.7%, followed by the industrial sector at 25.8%(2012). Agriculture represents 17.5% of GDP and it's the largest percentage in a Central American country. Nicaraguan labor force is estimated at 2.961 million of which 28% is occupied in agriculture, 19% in the industry sector and 53% in the service sector (2012). Unemployment was 7.2% in 2023.

== Sectors ==
=== Agriculture and food production ===
Food and agriculture
Product	World rank
Coffee, green	4
Beans, Dry	17
Groundnuts in Shell	30
Indigenous cattle meat	30
Plantains	32
Sesame Seed	32
Sugar Cane	32
Pineapples	33
Castor Beans	37
Cocoa beans	41
Cassava	48
Oranges	49
Soybeans	50

Coffee became Nicaragua's principal crop in the 1870s, a position it still held in 1992 despite the growing importance of other crops. Cotton gained importance in the late 1940s, and in 1992 was the second biggest export earner. In the early 20th century, Nicaraguan governments were reluctant to give concessions to the large United States banana companies, and bananas never attained the level of prominence in Nicaragua that they reached in Nicaragua's Central American neighbors; bananas were grown in the country, however, and were generally the third largest export earner in the post-World War II period. Beef and animal byproducts, the most important agricultural export for the three centuries before the coffee boom of the late 19th century, were still important commodities in 1992.

From the end of World War II to the early 1960s, the growth and diversification of the agricultural sector drove the nation's economic expansion. From the early 1960s until the increased fighting in 1977 caused by the Sandinista revolution, agriculture remained a robust and significant part of the economy, although its growth slowed somewhat in comparison with the previous postwar decades. Statistics for the next fifteen years, however, show stagnation and then a drop in agricultural production.

The agricultural sector declined precipitously in the 1980s. Until the late 1970s, Nicaragua's agricultural export system generated 40 percent of the country's GDP, 60 percent of national employment, and 80 percent of foreign exchange earnings. Throughout the 1980s, the Contras destroyed or disrupted coffee harvests as well as other key income-generating crops. Private industry stopped investing in agriculture because of uncertain returns. Land was taken out of production of export crops to expand plantings of basic grain. Many coffee plants succumbed to disease.

In 1989, the fifth successive year of decline, farm production declined by roughly 7 percent in comparison with the previous year. Production of basic grains fell as a result of Hurricane Joan in 1988 and a drought in 1989. By 1990 agricultural exports had declined to less than half the level of 1978. The only bright spot was the production of nontraditional export crops such as sesame, tobacco, and African palm oil.

=== Energy ===
Nicaragua has the 2nd lowest electricity generation in Central America, ahead only of Belize. Nicaragua also possesses the lowest percentage of population with access to electricity. The unbundling and privatization process of the 1990s did not achieve the expected objectives, resulting in very little generation capacity added to the system. This, together with its high dependence on oil for electricity generation (the highest in the region), led to an energy crisis in 2006 from which the country struggled to recover from.

The recent figures are available at: https://web.archive.org/web/20130726102527/http://ine.gob.ni/DGE/serieHistorica.html

The Nicaraguan electricity system comprises the National Interconnected System (SIN), which covers more than 90% of the territory where the population of the country lives (the entire Pacific, Central and North zone of the country). The remaining regions are covered by small isolated generation systems. The Central American Electrical Interconnection System (SIEPAC) project will integrate the electricity network of the country with the rest of the Central American countries, which is expected to improve reliability of supply and reduce costs.

=== Mining ===
Nicaragua is the largest exporter of gold in Central America. Gold was discovered along the northeastern coast in 1880, with the industry becoming privatized in 1994. Unlike in other Central American countries (specifically El Salvador and Guatemala), mining was a non-partisan issue in the 1990s, with both former revolutionary government officials and incoming neo-liberal officials supporting the industry. Incentives from the Nicaraguan government in 2007 to encourage business led to further development of the industry. In more recent years, there have been rapid expansions from international companies, leading to violence against and displacement of Indigenous and Afro-Nicaraguan communities. Since 2020, gold has moved from the country's third largest export to its top export, over coffee, beef and manufactured goods.

=== Services ===
The service sector was estimated to account for 56.8% of the country's GDP, and employs 52% of the active population. This section includes transportation, commerce, warehousing, restaurant and hotels, arts and entertainment, health, education, financial and banking services, telecommunications as well as public administration and defense.

==== Finance and banking ====
Banking in Nicaragua refers to its financial system, which includes private and state-owned banks, microfinance institutions, financial cooperatives, and insurance providers. All institutions are regulated by the Superintendency of Banks and Other Financial Institutions (SIBOIF), which makes sure there compliance with domestic laws and international standards. The Nicaraguan banking sector has faced many changes and significant restructuring, marked by nationalization, liberalization, and regulatory reforms. It is currently considered stable, with banks remaining well-capitalized and liquid.

Remittances play an important role in Nicaragua's economy and financial system, since they account for over a quarter of the country's GDP in recent years. However, the banking structure has been affected by political developments, U.S. sanctions, and new domestic legislation, influencing the structure and independence of the banking sector.

==== Education ====
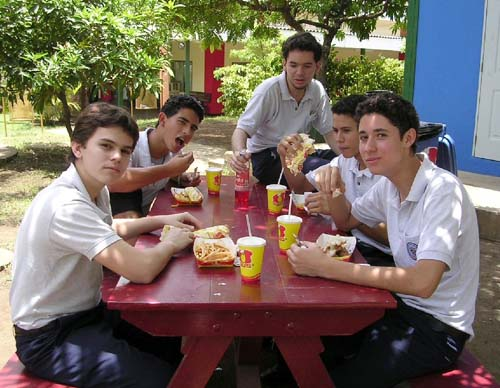
Boys at the American Nicaraguan School in Managua

Life in Nicaragua

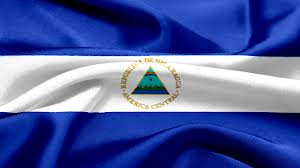

Cuisine
Culture
Demographics
Education
Holidays
Human Rights
Literature
Music
Politics
Religion
Tourism

Education in Nicaragua is free for all Nicaraguans. Elementary education is free and compulsory although this is not strictly enforced. Many children are not able to attend if their families need to have them work. Communities on the Caribbean Coast have access to education in both Spanish and the languages of the native indigenous tribes that live in the more rural areas of Nicaragua. Higher education has financial, organic and administrative autonomy, according to the law. Freedom of subjects is recognized. The school year runs from February through November.

The Human Rights Measurement Initiative (HRMI) finds that Nicaragua is fulfilling only 73.7% of what it should be fulfilling for the right to education based on the country's level of income. HRMI breaks down the right to education by looking at the rights to both primary education and secondary education. While taking into consideration Nicaragua's income level, the nation is achieving 92.3% of what should be possible based on its resources (income) for primary education but only 55.1% for secondary education. Nicaragua also has the lowest literacy rate in Central America with only 82.6% of the population age 15 and over literate.

==== Healthcare ====
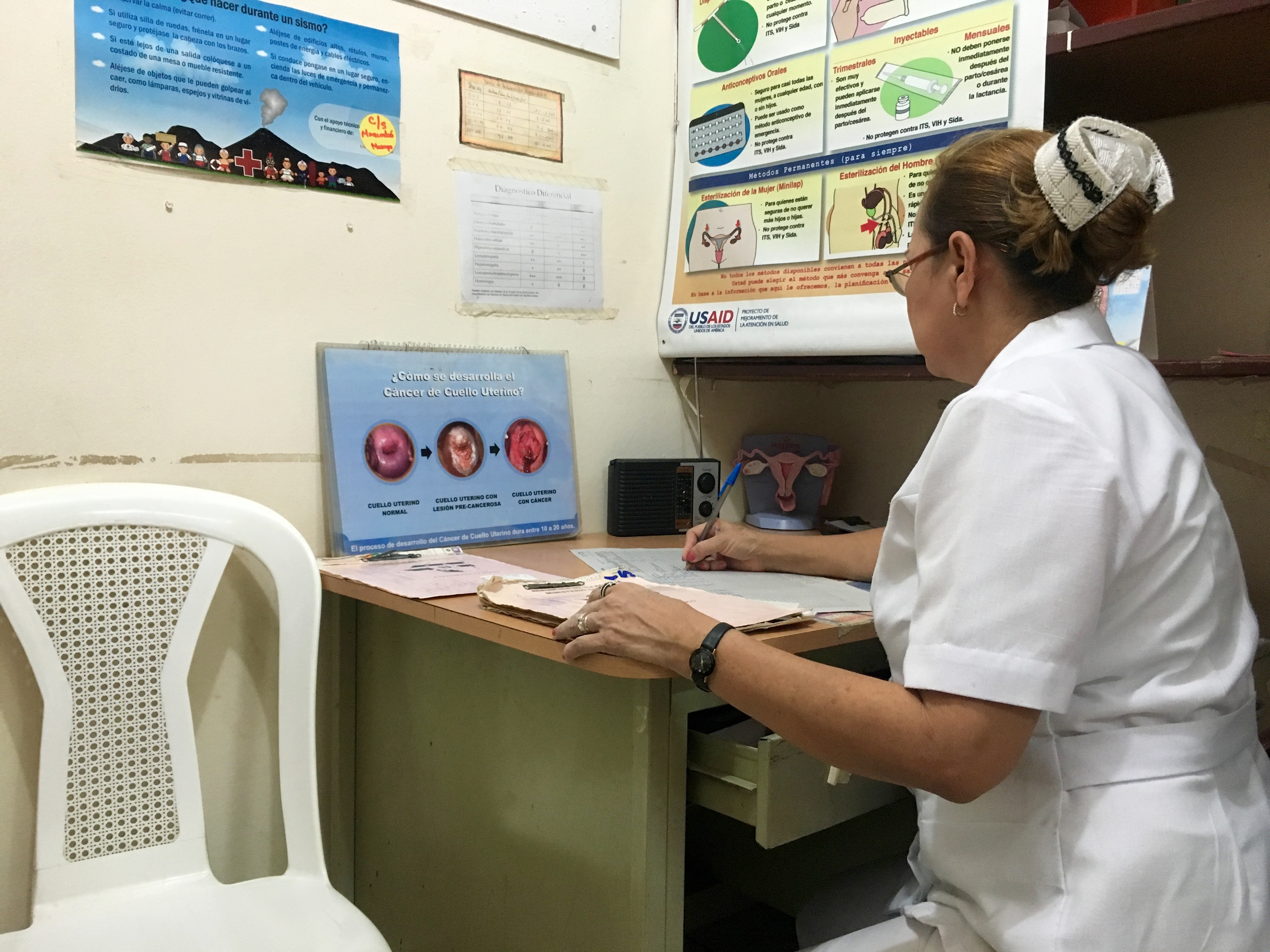
Nicaraguan nurse preparing to administer a Papanicolaou test

Healthcare in Nicaragua involves the collaboration of private and public institutions. Although Nicaragua's health outcomes have improved over the past few decades with the efficient utilization of resources relative to other Central American nations, it still confronts challenges responding to its population's diverse healthcare needs.

The Nicaraguan government guarantees universal free health care for its citizens. However, limitations of current delivery models and unequal distribution of resources and medical personnel contribute to the persistent lack of quality care in more remote areas of Nicaragua, especially among rural communities in the Central and Atlantic region. To respond to the dynamic needs of localities, the government has adopted a decentralized model that emphasizes community-based preventative and primary medical care.

==== Telecommunications ====
Telecommunications in Nicaragua include radio, television, fixed and mobile telephones, and the Internet.

==== Tourism ====
Tourism is one of the most important industries in the country. It is the second largest source of foreign exchange for the country and is predicted to become the first largest industry in 2007. The growth in tourism has positively affected the agricultural, commercial, finance, and construction industries as well.

=== Water supply and sanitation ===
Drinking water and sanitation in Nicaragua are provided by a national public utility in urban areas and water committees in rural areas. Despite relatively high levels of investment, access to drinking water in urban areas has barely kept up with population growth, access to urban sanitation has actually declined and service quality remains poor. However, a substantial increase in access to water supply and sanitation has been reached in rural areas.

The water sector underwent major reforms in 1998 that separated policy, regulatory, and operating functions. Decentralization has been proposed for a decade, but implementation was very slow and in mid-2007 was reversed when the national water company took over two municipal systems.

== Current economic outlook ==
Historical GDP per capita development of Nicaragua

Nicaragua has ratified Free Trade Agreements with major markets such as the United States, the Dominican Republic (DR-CAFTA), Taiwan and Mexico, among others. As evidence of continuous efforts in improving the business climate, Nicaragua has been ranked favorably in a variety of independent evaluations.

The 2011 Doing Business Report, published by The World Bank Group, a report that benchmarks various indicators of the investment climate in 183 nations, ranked Nicaragua as the top location in Central America in starting a business, investor protection, and closing a business. Additionally, the country improved in the following categories: ease of doing business, registering property, paying taxes, trading across borders, and enforcing contracts.

=== Data ===
The following table shows the main economic indicators in 1980–2020 (with IMF staff stimtates in 2021–2026). Inflation below 5% is in green.

Year	GDP (in Bil. US$PPP)	GDP per capita (in US$ PPP)	GDP (in Bil. US$nominal)	GDP per capita (in US$ nominal)	GDP growth (real)	Inflation rate (in Percent)	Unemployment (in Percent)	Government debt (in % of GDP)
1980	6.2	n/a	1.8	n/a	▲4.6%	▲35.1%	13.4%	n/a
1981	▲7.1	n/a	▲2.2	n/a	▲5.4%	▲23.8%	▼11.8%	n/a
1982	▲7.5	n/a	▲2.5	n/a	▼-0.8%	▲28.5%	▲12.4%	n/a
1983	▲8.2	n/a	▲2.9	n/a	▲4.6%	▲33.6%	▼11.0%	n/a
1984	▲8.3	n/a	▲4.0	n/a	▼-1.6%	▲141.3%	▲12.0%	n/a
1985	▼8.2	n/a	▼3.9	n/a	▼-4.1%	▲571.4%	▲12.5%	n/a
1986	▲8.3	n/a	▲5.8	n/a	▼-1.0%	▲885.2%	▲13.1%	n/a
1987	▲8.5	n/a	▼3.4	n/a	▼-0.7%	▲13,109.5%	▲14.0%	n/a
1988	▼7.7	n/a	▼1.5	n/a	▼-12.4%	▲4,775.2%	▲14.2%	n/a
1989	▲7.8	n/a	▲2.1	n/a	▼-1.7%	▲7,428.7%	▲15.0%	n/a
1990	▲8.1	n/a	▼0.5	n/a	▼-0.1%	▲3,004.1%	▲15.5%	n/a
1991	▲8.4	n/a	▲3.7	n/a	▼-0.2%	▲116.6%	▼14.9%	n/a
1992	▲8.6	n/a	▲3.9	n/a	▲0.4%	▲21.9%	▼14.4%	n/a
1993	▲8.8	n/a	▼3.7	n/a	▼-0.4%	▲13.5%	▲15.0%	n/a
1994	▲9.4	2,191.5	▲3.9	898.2	▲5.0%	▲3.7%	▲17.1%	n/a
1995	▲10.2	▲2,301.4	▲4.1	▲935.3	▲5.9%	▲11.1%	▼16.9%	n/a
1996	▲11.0	▲2,425.3	▲4.3	▲947.1	▲6.3%	▲11.7%	▼16.0%	n/a
1997	▲11.7	▲2,498.7	▲4.4	▼940.1	▲4.0%	▲9.2%	▼14.3%	86.4%
1998	▲12.2	▲2,568.9	▲4.6	▲973.1	▲3.7%	▲13.0%	▼13.2%	▲86.5%
1999	▲13.3	▲2,733.8	▲4.9	▲999.4	▲7.0%	▲11.2%	▼10.7%	▲99.8%
2000	▲14.1	▲2,852.6	▲5.1	▲1,030.7	▲4.1%	▲11.5%	▼9.8%	▼95.2%
2001	▲14.9	▲2,942.9	▲5.3	▲1,054.7	▲3.0%	▲7.4%	▼6.4%	▼87.5%
2002	▲15.2	▲2,950.8	▼5.2	▼1,011.9	▲0.8%	▲3.8%	▲12.2%	▲110.4%
2003	▲15.9	▲3,023.2	▲5.3	▼1,010.2	▲2.5%	▲5.3%	▼7.0%	▼109.5%
2004	▲17.2	▲3,204.1	▲5.8	▲1,077.8	▲5.3%	▲8.5%	▼6.5%	▼84.0%
2005	▲18.5	▲3,377.8	▲6.3	▲1,152.8	▲4.3%	▲9.6%	▼5.6%	▼66.6%
2006	▲19.8	▲3,588.9	▲6.8	▲1,224.7	▲3.8%	▲9.1%	▼5.2%	▼51.2%
2007	▲21.4	▲3,822.5	▲7.4	▲1,326.7	▲5.1%	▲11.1%	▲5.9%	▼30.9%
2008	▲22.5	▲3,977.5	▲8.5	▲1,498.9	▲3.4%	▲19.8%	▲6.1%	▼26.0%
2009	▼21.9	▼3,821.7	▼8.3	▼1,444.9	▼-3.3%	▲3.7%	▲8.2%	▲29.3%
2010	▲23.2	▲3,987.4	▲8.8	▲1,506.1	▲4.4%	▲5.5%	▼7.8%	▲30.3%
2011	▲25.2	▲4,196.7	▲9.8	▲1,630.0	▲6.3%	▲8.1%	▼5.9%	▼28.8%
2012	▲26.5	▲4,363.4	▲10.5	▲1,734.8	▲6.5%	▲7.2%	▼5.9%	▼27.9%
2013	▲28.0	▲4,556.3	▲11.0	▲1,790.4	▲4.9%	▲7.1%	▼5.7%	▲28.8%
2014	▲30.4	▲4,897.5	▲11.9	▲1,916.8	▲4.8%	▲6.0%	▲6.6%	▼28.7%
2015	▲32.9	▲5,260.5	▲12.8	▲2,036.9	▲4.8%	▲4.0%	▼5.9%	▲28.9%
2016	▲35.9	▲5,672.5	▲13.3	▲2,099.6	▲4.6%	▲3.5%	▼4.5%	▲30.9%
2017	▲38.3	▲5,995.6	▲13.8	▲2,156.1	▲4.6%	▲3.9%	▼3.7%	▲34.1%
2018	▼37.9	▼5,871.2	▼13.0	▼2,016.2	▼-3.4%	▲4.9%	▲5.5%	▲37.7%
2019	▼37.2	▼5,697.3	▼12.6	▼1,934.1	▼-3.7%	▲5.4%	▲6.1%	▲41.7%
2020	▼36.9	▼5,679.2	12.6	▲1,942.6	▼-2.0%	▲3.7%	▲7.3%	▲47.9%
2021	▲40.1	▲6,132.8	▲13.4	▲2,047.1	▲5.0%	▲4.1%	▲11.1%	▲49.5%
2022	▲42.7	▲6,454.9	▲13.9	▲2,109.3	▲3.5%	▲3.6%	▼7.5%	▼48.1%
2023	▲44.7	▲6,684.3	▲14.3	▲2,143.8	▲2.2%	▲3.5%	▼7.2%	▲48.9%
2024	▲46.8	▲6,928.6	▲14.7	▲2,183.2	▲2.4%	▲3.5%	▼6.8%	▲50.1%
2025	▲49.0	▲7,188.3	▲15.3	▲2,237.7	▲2.6%	▲3.5%	▼6.4%	▲50.6%
2026	▲51.4	▲7,461.3	▲15.9	▲2,312.8	▲2.8%	▲3.5%	▼6.0%	▼50.6%

== Other statistics ==
Exports of Nicaragua by product category (2019) Chemical products Transportation Machines Mineral products Plastics and rubbers Metals Foodstuffs Precious metals Textiles Instruments Animal products Vegetable products Paper goods Footwear and headwear Miscellaneous Stone and glass Wood products Animal and vegetable bi-products Animal hides Arts and antiques Weapons

Household income or consumption by percentage share: lowest 10%: 1.4%; highest 10%: 41.8 (2005)

Industrial production growth rate: 2.4% (2005)

Electricity - production: 2.778 billion kWh (2006)

Electricity - production by source: fossil fuel: 53.43%; hydro: 35.34%; nuclear: 0%; other: 11.23% (1998). A large number of wind turbines have been installed along the SW shore of Lake Nicaragua since, and some geothermal plants have been constructed as well. As of 2013, the breakdown was: fossil fuel: 50%; wind power: 15%; geothermal: 16%, hydropower: 12%, biomass power: 7%.

Electricity - consumption: 2.929 billion kWh (2006)

Electricity - exports: 69.34 million kWh (2006)

Electricity - imports: 0 kWh (2006)

Agriculture - products: coffee, bananas, sugarcane, cotton, rice, corn, tobacco, sesame, soya, beans, beef, veal, pork, poultry, dairy products; shrimp, lobsters

Exports - commodities: coffee, beef, shrimp, lobster, cotton, tobacco, peanuts, sugar, bananas, gold

Imports - commodities: consumer goods, machinery equipment, raw materials, petroleum products

Currency: 1 gold Cordoba (C$) = 100 centavos

Exchange rates: Córdoba (C$) per US$1 – 17.582 (2006), 16.733 (2005), 15.937 (2004), 15.105 (2003), 14.251 (2002)

Price inflation:

- 2007: 16.88%
- 2008: 13.37%

== See also ==
- List of companies of Nicaragua
- Bolsa de Valores de Nicaragua
- Central America–United Kingdom Association Agreement
- Corruption in Nicaragua
- Economy of Central America
- Nicaragua and the World Bank
- Nicaraguan Canal and Development Project
- Nicaraguan Social Security Institute
- Protests against Daniel Ortega
- Social Protection Network
