= Nicaraguan córdoba =

Currency of Nicaragua

Córdoba nicaragüense (Spanish)
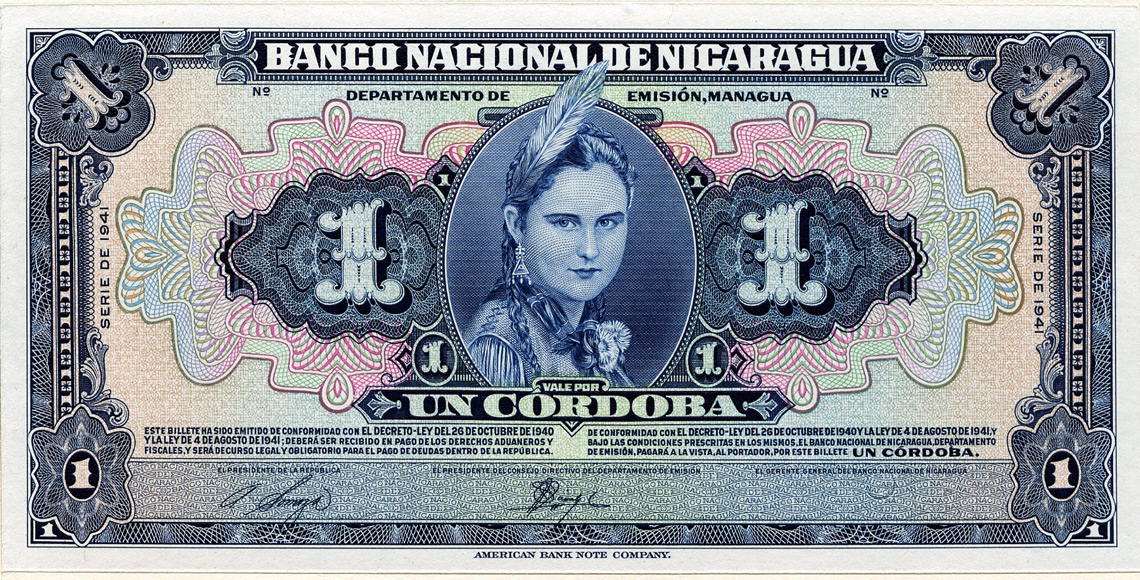
- 1 córdoba banknote issued in 1941, displaying the daughter of Anastasio Somoza García

ISO 4217
- Code: NIO (numeric: 558) before 1991: NIC
- Subunit: 0.01

Units of account
- Symbol: C$
- Subunit
- 1/100: centavo

Denominations
- Banknotes: C$5, C$10, C$20, C$50, C$100, C$200, C$500, C$1000
- Coins: 10, 25, 50 centavos, C$1, C$5, C$10
- Rarely used: 5 Centavos, 10 Cordobas

Demographics
- Date of introduction: 1912
- Replaced: Nicaraguan peso
- User(s): Nicaragua

Issuance
- Central bank: Central Bank of Nicaragua
- Website: www.bcn.gob.ni

Valuation
- Inflation: 0.87% (2025)

The córdoba (Spanish pronunciation: ['koɾ.ðo.βa], sign: C$; code: NIO) is the currency of Nicaragua. It is subdivided into 100 centavos.

== History ==
The first córdoba was introduced with the new National Bank of Nicaragua (Banco Nacional de Nicaragua Incorporado) which was created in 1912, after which the government of Adolfo Díaz promulgated the Monetary Conversion Law, in March 1912. This law created the monetary unit "córdoba", named after Francisco Hernández de Córdoba, founder of Nicaragua and the cities of León and Granada, but due to the prevailing political instability at that time, the córdoba did not circulate until 1913. It replaced the peso moneda corriente, the Nicaraguan currency between 1878 and 1912.

In 1960 the Central Bank of Nicaragua (BCN) was founded and the banknotes and coins that until that date were issued by the National Bank of Nicaragua, began to be issued by the central bank.

From 1979 onwards, a period characterised by high inflation began, which caused the currency to lose value and led to the currency exchange and conversion operation of 14 February 1988, in which the córdoba, under the Sandinista regime's "Operation Berta" (Operación Berta), was replaced by the "new córdoba" (córdoba nuevo) at an exchange rate of 1,000 to 1. In the period 1988–1990, the period of high inflation continued, which led to the córdoba nuevo being replaced by the córdoba oro, with parity against the US dollar. In 1992, the "córdoba" was established and persists to this day.

== Coins ==
=== First córdoba ===
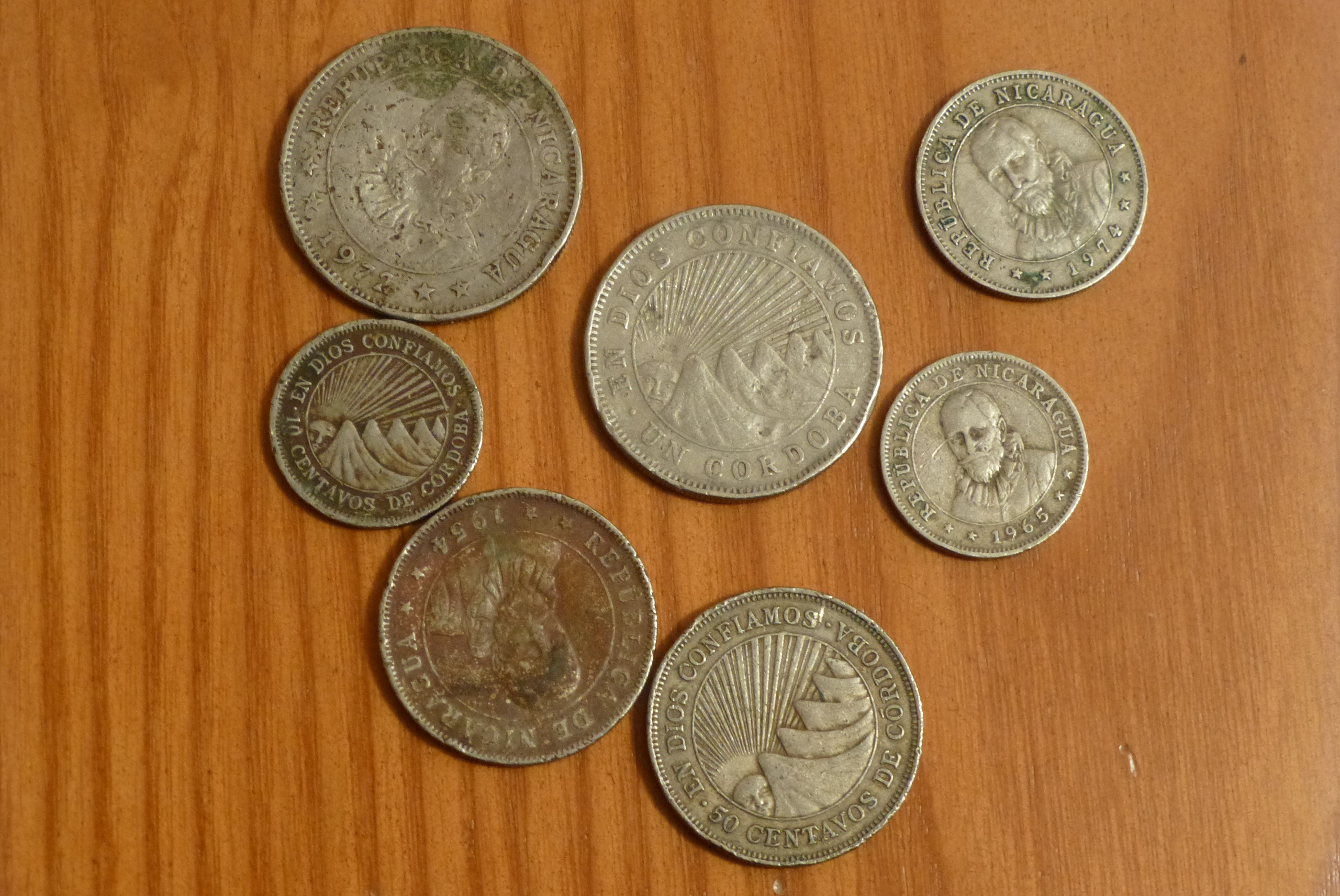
Various coins before the FSLN took power in 1979

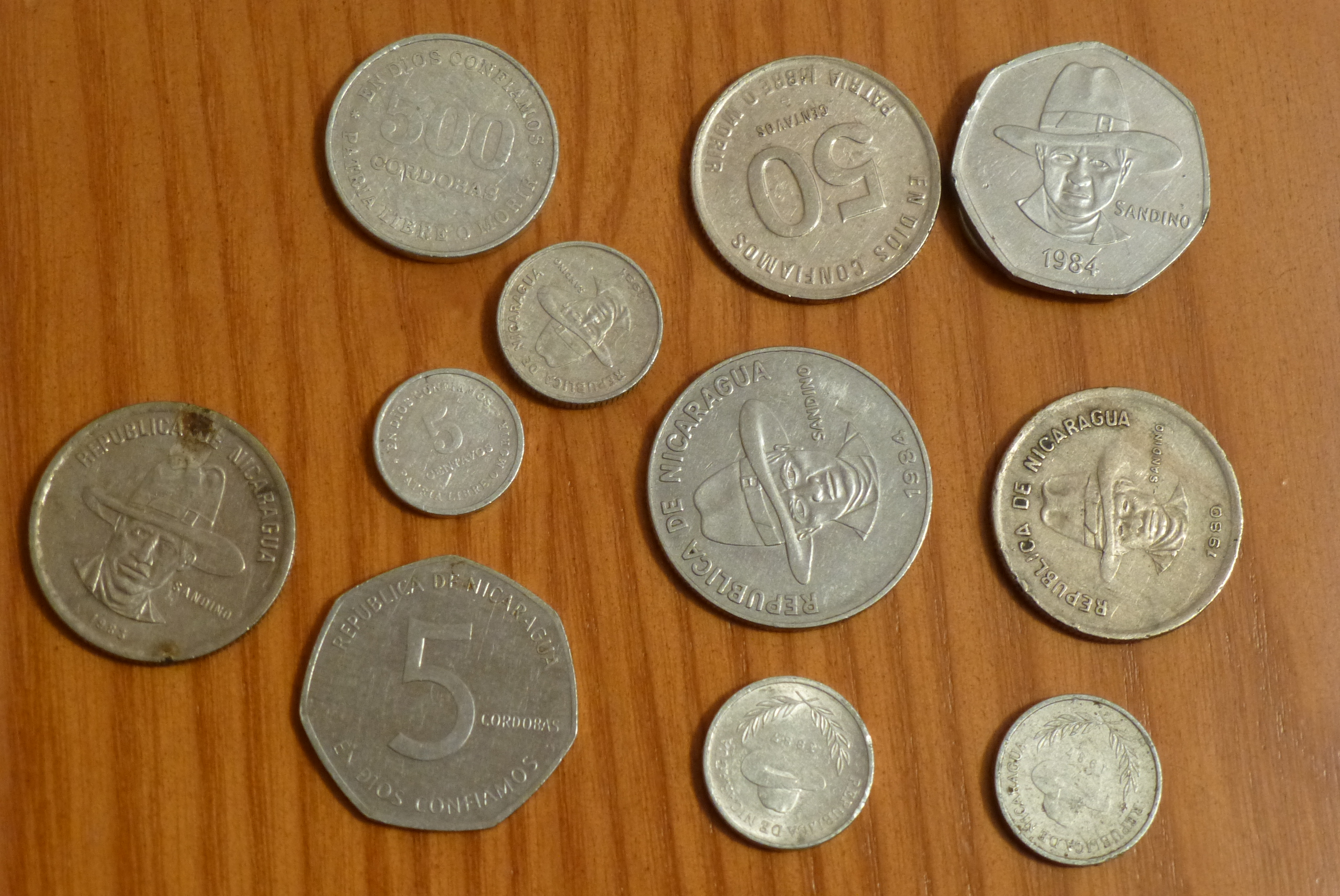
Various coins after the FSLN took power in 1979

In 1912, coins were introduced in denominations of 1/2, 1, 5, 10, 25, and 50 centavos and 1 córdoba. The 1/2 and 1 centavo were minted in bronze, the 5 centavos in cupro-nickel and the higher denominations in silver. The 1 córdoba was only minted in 1912, whilst 1/2 centavo production ceased in 1937.

In 1939, cupro-nickel replaced silver on the 10, 25, and 50 centavos. In 1943, a single year issue of brass 1, 5, 10, and 25 centavos was made. These were the last 1 centavo coins. In 1972, cupro-nickel 1 córdoba coins were issued, followed, in 1974, by aluminium 5 and 10 centavos.

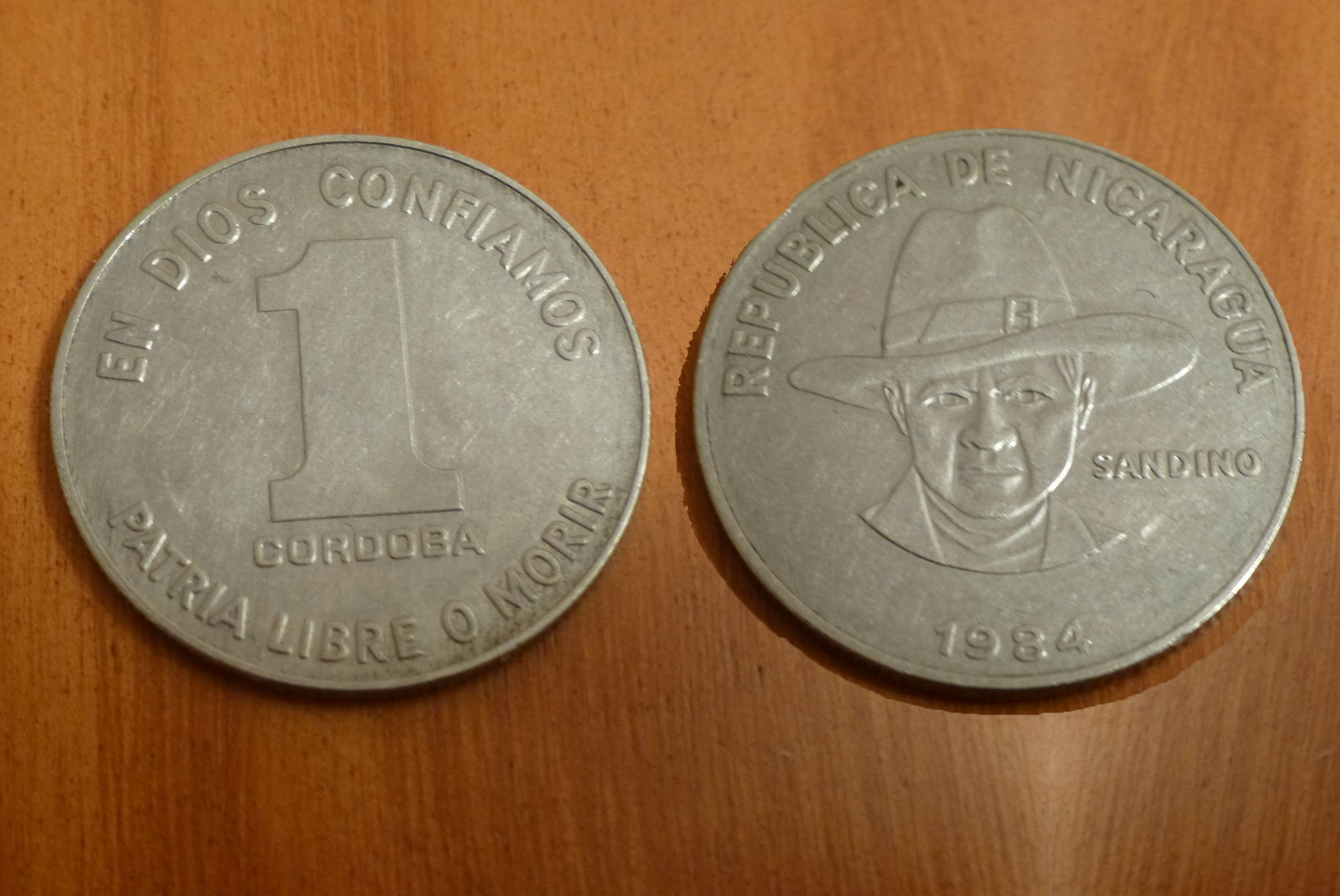
1 córdoba coin from the Nicaraguan Revolution depicting Augusto César Sandino

A new series of coins, featuring a portrait of Augusto César Sandino, was introduced in 1981, consisting of aluminum 5 and 10 centavos, nickel-clad steel 25 centavos and cupro-nickel 50 centavos, 1 and 5 córdobas. Nickel clad steel replaced cupro nickel between 1983 and 1984. In 1987, the final coins of the 1st córdoba were issued, featuring Sandino's characteristic hat. Aluminum 500 córdobas were issued.

The 25 and 50 centavo coins, along with 1 córdoba coins, minted in 1985 were mostly recalled and destroyed by the Central Bank. A few of the 1 córdoba were circulated as seen.

=== Second córdoba ===
No coins were issued for this currency.

=== Third córdoba (córdoba oro) ===
In 1991, coins dated 1987 but actually introduced with that year's re-denomination, in denominations of 5, 10, and 25 centavos and aluminum-bronze 50 centavos. 1 and 5 córdobas were issued.

In 1994, coins were issued in denominations of 5, 10, 25, and 50 centavos. All were minted in chrome-plated steel. In 1997, nickel-clad steel 50 centavos, 1 and 5 córdobas were introduced, followed by copper-plated steel 5 centavos and brass-plated steel 10 and 25 centavos in 2002 and brass-plated steel 10 córdobas in 2007.

1994 Series
| Value(₡) | Years | Composition | Shape | Diameter | Weight | Obverse | Reverse | Image |
|---|---|---|---|---|---|---|---|---|
| 5 Centavos | 1994 | Chromium plated Steel | Circular | 15 mm | 2.1 g | National coat of arms | Dove over map of Nicaragua with date and value below | |
| 10 Centavos | 1994 | Chromium plated Steel | Circular | 17 mm | 2.68 g | National coat of arms | Dove over map of Nicaragua with date and value below | |
| 25 Centavos | 1994 | Chromium plated Steel | Circular | 19 mm | 3.86 g | National coat of arms | Dove over map of Nicaragua with date and value below | |
| 50 Centavos | 1994 | Chromium plated Steel | Circular | 22 mm | 4.6 g | National coat of arms | Dove over map of Nicaragua with date and value below | |

1997 Series
| Value(₡) | Years | Composition | Shape | Diameter | Weight | Obverse | Reverse | Image |
|---|---|---|---|---|---|---|---|---|
| 50 Centavos | 1997 | Nickel clad Steel | Circular | 22 mm | 5 g | National coat of arms | Face value and date | |
| 1 Córdoba | 1997, 2000 | Nickel clad Steel | Circular | 25 mm | 6.25 g | National coat of arms | Face value and date | |
| 5 Córdobas | 1997, 2000 | Nickel clad Steel | Circular | 28 mm | 7.8 g | National coat of arms | Face value and date | |

2002 Series
| Value(₡) | Years | Composition | Shape | Diameter | Weight | Obverse | Reverse | Image |
|---|---|---|---|---|---|---|---|---|
| 5 Centavos | 2002 | Copper plated Steel | Circular | 18.5 mm | 3 g | National coat of arms | Face value and date | |
| 10 Centavos | 2002 | Brass plated Steel | Circular | 20.5 mm | 4 g | National coat of arms | Face value and date | |
| 25 Centavos | 2002, 2003, 2007 | Brass plated Steel | Circular | 23.25 mm | 5.1 g | National coat of arms | Face value and date | |
| 1 Córdoba | 2002, 2007, 2008, 2009, 2010, 2012, 2014 | Nickel clad Steel | Circular | 25 mm | 6.25 g | National coat of arms | Face value and date | |

2007 Series
| Value(₡) | Years | Composition | Shape | Diameter | Weight | Obverse | Reverse | Image |
|---|---|---|---|---|---|---|---|---|
| 10 Centavos | 2007, 2012, 2015 | Aluminium | Circular | 20.5 mm | 1.4 g | National coat of arms | Face value and date | |
| 25 Centavos | 2007, 2014 | Brass plated Steel | Circular | 23.25 mm | 5.1 g | National coat of arms | Face value and date | |
| 50 Centavos | 2007, 2014 | Nickel clad Steel | Circular | 22 mm | 5 g | National coat of arms | Face value and date | |
| 5 Córdobas | 2007, 2014 | Nickel clad Steel | Circular | 28 mm | 7.8 g | National coat of arms | Face value and date | |
| 10 Córdobas | 2007 | Brass plated Steel | Circular | 26.5 mm | 8.5 g | National coat of arms | Statue of Andrés Castro with face value, date, and latent image | |

In 2012, the Central Bank issued a 5 Córdobas coin to commemorate the 100th anniversary of the introduction of the Córdoba.

2022 Series
| Value(₡) | Years | Composition | Shape | Diameter | Weight | Obverse | Reverse | Image |
|---|---|---|---|---|---|---|---|---|
| 25 Centavos | 2022 | Aluminium | Circular | N/a | N/a | National coat of arms | Face value and date | |
| 50 Centavos | 2022 | Stainless Steel | Circular | N/a | N/a | National coat of arms | Face value and date | |
| 1 Córdoba | 2022 | Stainless Steel | Circular | N/a | 6 g | National coat of arms | Face value and date | |
| 5 Córdobas | 2022 | Stainless Steel | Circular | N/a | N/a | National coat of arms | Face value and date | |

== Banknotes ==
=== First córdoba ===
In 1912, the National Bank of Nicaragua introduced notes for 10, 25, and 50 centavos, 1, 2, 5, 10, 20, 50, and 100 córdobas, together with old half- and 1-peso moneda corriente notes overprinted for 4 and 8 centavos of the new currency. In 1934, all circulating banknotes were exchanged for notes which had been overprinted with "REVALIDO" ("revalidated"). The last notes for less than 1 córdoba were dated 1938. In 1945, 500-córdoba notes were introduced, followed by 1,000-córdoba notes in 1953.

A 1,000-córdoba banknote, which was reprinted with a value of 200,000 córdobas during the inflationary period of the late 1980s.

In 1962, the Central Bank of Nicaragua took over paper money issuance by a bank resolution of 8 February 1962 and executive decree No. 71 of 26 April 1962. The 1-córdoba notes were replaced by coins in 1972. After 5-córdoba coins were introduced in 1981, 2 and 5-córdoba notes were withdrawn. In 1987, 5000-córdoba notes were introduced, followed by overprinted 10,000 (on 10), 20,000 (on 20), 50,000 (on 50), 100,000 (on 100), 100,000 (on 500), 200,000 (on 1,000), 500,000 (on 1,000), and 1,000,000 (on 1,000) córdobas notes as inflation drastically reduced the córdoba's value.

=== Second córdoba ===
The second córdoba was only issued in banknote form. Notes (dated 1985) were issued in 1988 in denominations of 10, 20, 50, 100, 500, and 1000 córdobas together with undated 5000 córdobas. In 1989, notes for 10,000, 20,000, 50,000, and 100,000 córdobas were introduced, followed the next year by 200,000, 500,000, 1 million, 5 million, and 10 million córdobas notes.

=== Third córdoba (córdoba oro) ===
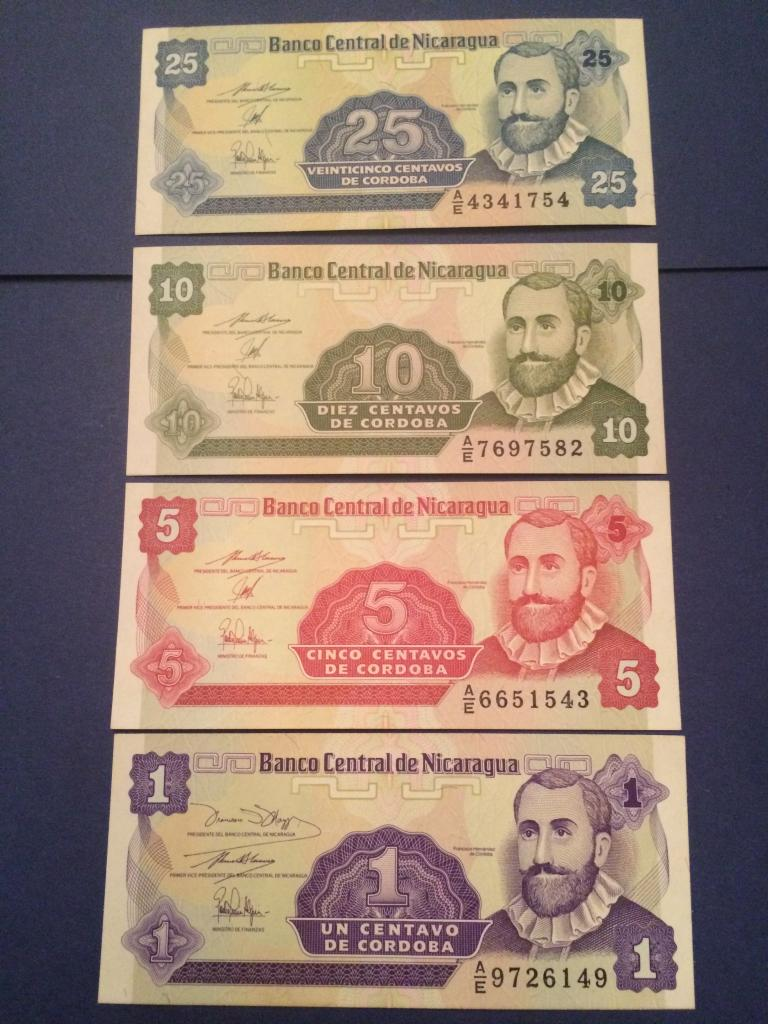
1991 córdobas with conquistador Hernández de Córdoba

In 1991, notes were introduced for 1, 5, 10, and 25 centavos, 1/2, 1, 5, 10, 20, 50, and 100 córdobas. The notes below 1 córdoba were replaced by coins in 1994, with 5 córdobas notes also being replaced in 1997. 500 córdobas notes were introduced in 2002.

Famous people from Nicaragua's history are depicted on the obverses of the current banknotes. The reverses depict landmarks or natural habitats in the country.

2002 series (Resolution of 10 April 2002)
| Image | Value | Main Color | Description | | Date of printing |
| Image | Value | Main Color | Obverse | Reverse | Date of printing |
|---|---|---|---|---|---|
| | C$10 | Green | Miguel Larreynaga | Islets of Granada | 2002 |
| | C$20 | Orange | José Santos Zelaya | Atlantic Beach | 2002 |
| | C$50 | Purple | Pedro Joaquín Chamorro | Fortress of El Castillo de la Inmaculada Concepción | 2002 |
| | C$100 | Blue | Rubén Darío | Rubén Darío National Theatre | 2002 |
| | C$500 | Red | José Dolores Estrada | Hacienda San Jacinto | 2002 |
For table standards, see the banknote specification table.

=== 2009 series ===
On May 15, 2009, polymer ten and twenty córdoba notes were issued to circulate alongside their paper counterparts. A new polymer two hundred and a paper one hundred córdoba banknote was first issued on June 1, 2009. A new polymer 50 córdoba was issued on December 3, 2009. The new designed paper 500 córdoba banknote was introduced on January 12, 2010. A commemorative design of the 50 córdobas was introduced on September 15, 2010, to commemorate the Banco Central de Nicaragua's 50th anniversary of its establishment. In 2012, the Banco Central de Nicaragua (Central Bank of Nicaragua) began issuing a new series of córdoba banknotes with revised security features, beginning with the 10, 20, and 200 córdoba polymer banknotes, which is similar to their first issue, but the notable change is the embossed "10", "20", and "200" on the see-through window now being of an opaque white.

The 100 córdoba banknote was also revised. The notable differences from the first issue is that the note was issued on the 100th anniversary of the córdoba currency. Also notable is the wider security thread, a revised registration device, a repositioned serial number, subtle underprint design changes and the commemorative text "1912-2012 Centenario del Córdoba" in pearlescent ink at the left front of the note. The 500 córdoba banknote was also revised. The most notable change for the note is the bank logo patch, now a holographic patch instead of an optically variable device and a wider security thread.

2009 series (Resolution of 12 September 2007)
| Image | | Value | Dimensions | Main Colour | Description | | | Date of | |
| Obverse | Reverse | Value | Dimensions | Main Colour | Obverse | Reverse | Watermark | printing | issue |
|---|---|---|---|---|---|---|---|---|---|
| | | 10 córdobas^{1} | 131 × 67 mm | Green | Fortress of the Immaculate Conception, Rio San Juan | Hacienda San Jacinto | "10", slighted tilted above El Castillo on the upper right hand side. | 2009 | May 15, 2009 |
| | | 20 córdobas^{2} | 136 × 67 mm | Yellow | Hut of natives on the eastern coast of the Caribbean. | Illustration of the Palo de Mayo dance | "20", Girl pounding grain | 2009 | May 15, 2009 |
| | | 50 córdobas | 141 × 67 mm | Violet | National ceramic of Nicaragua | Canyon of Somoto | National ceramic of Nicaragua, "50" watermark | 2009 | December 3, 2009 |
| | | 50 córdobas | 67 x 141 mm | Violet | First building of the Central Bank | Canyon of Somoto | "50" watermark | 2010 | September 16, 2010 |
| | | 100 córdobas | 146 × 67 mm | Blue | Monument to Rubén Darío | León Cathedral | Emblem of the Central Bank of Nicaragua; watermark of a lion. | 2009 | June 1, 2009 |
| | | 200 córdobas | 151 × 67 mm | Brown | El Güegüense | Ometepe Island, the national bird, the Momotus momota. | "200", The Güegüense with watermark and cape. | 2009 | June 1, 2009 |
| | | 500 córdobas | 156 × 67 mm | Red | Residential Museum of Augusto César Sandino | Native statues | "500" watermark, Sandino | 2010 | January 12, 2010 |
These images are to scale at 0.7 pixel per millimetre (18 pixel per inch). For table standards, see the banknote specification table.

=== 2015 and 2017 series ===
On 26 October 2015, the Banco Central de Nicaragua introduced a new family of banknotes in denominations of 10, 20, 50, 100, 200, and 500 Córdobas. The six lower denominations are printed in polymer, while the 500 Córdobas note is printed on cotton paper substrate. On 1 December 2016, the Banco Central de Nicaragua introduced a 1,000 Córdobas banknote to ease high-value transactions. A commemorative design was issued on 1 December 2016 to commemorate the 100th anniversary of the death of poet Rubén Darío and a regular issue was issued on 2 January 2017.

In July 2019, the 500 and 1000 Córdoba banknotes were reissued in polymer, to circulate in parallel with existing issues.

2015–2017 series (resolution of 26 March 2014)
| Image | | Value | Dimensions | Main Color | Description | | Material | Date of issue |
| Obverse | Reverse | Value | Dimensions | Main Color | Obverse | Reverse | Material | Date of issue |
|---|---|---|---|---|---|---|---|---|
| | | C$5 | 126 x 67 mm | Grey | Building of the nicaraguan central bank | Las Piedrecitas overpass | Polymer | October 2015 |
| | | C$10 | 131 x 67 mm | Green | Puerto Salvador Allende, Managua | La Vaquita (Patron Saint festivities of Managua) | Polymer | October 2015 |
| | | C$20 | 136 x 67 mm | Orange | Moravian church, Laguna de Perlas | Mayo Ya Festival | Polymer | October 2015 |
| | | C$50 | 141 x 67 mm | Violet | Artisan Market, Masaya | Folkloristic ballet | Polymer | October 2015 |
| | | C$100 | 146 x 67 mm | Blue | Cathedral of Granada | Horse cart | Polymer | October 2015 |
| | | C$200 | 151 x 67 mm | Brown | Rubén Darío National Theater, Managua | El Güegüense comedy ballet | Polymer | October 2015 |
| | | C$500 | 156 x 67 mm | Red | Cathedral of León | Momotombo Volcano | Paper | October 2015 |
| | | C$500 | 156 x 67 mm | Red | Cathedral of León | Momotombo Volcano | Polymer | July 2019 |
| | | C$1,000 | 161 x 67 mm | Dark green | Nicaraguan poet Rubén Darío | Poem by Darío | Paper | December 2016 |
| | | C$1,000 | 161 x 67 mm | Dark green | Hacienda San Jacinto, Tipitapa | Castle of the Immaculate Conception, Río San Juan | Paper | January 2017 |
| | | C$1,000 | 156 x 67 mm | Dark green | Hacienda San Jacinto, Tipitapa | Castle of the Immaculate Conception, Río San Juan | Polymer | July 2019 |

== Exchange rate ==
In 1991, the Central Bank of Nicaragua established a crawling peg scheme in accordance with FMI exchange rate policies with a 12% annual rate of devaluation; "as of 2014", this scheme continued to devalue the córdoba against the United States dollar by 5% per annum and decrease further at 3% per annum, subsequently. Since January 2024 the Nicaraguan Central Bank has maintained a fixed exchange rate of 36.6243 córdobas to one US dollar.

Current NIO exchange rates
| From Google Finance: | AUD CAD CHF CNY EUR GBP HKD JPY USD CRC HNL |
| From Yahoo! Finance: | AUD CAD CHF CNY EUR GBP HKD JPY USD CRC HNL |
| From XE.com: | AUD CAD CHF CNY EUR GBP HKD JPY USD CRC HNL |
| From OANDA: | AUD CAD CHF CNY EUR GBP HKD JPY USD CRC HNL |

=== Historical exchange rates ===
- US$1 =
  - 36.6243 (Banco Central de Nicaragua) (April 6, 2025)
  - 36.773 (XE) (November 2024)
  - 32.949 (XE) (July 2019)
  - 25.005 córdobas (August 2013)(XE)
  - 20.865 (Yahoo) or 20.8623 (XE) or 20.5250 (Oanda) (January 10, 2010)
  - 20.425 (Yahoo) or 20.4263 (XE) or 20.222 (Oanda) or 20.4268 (Central Bank of Nicaragua) córdobas (August 4, 2009)
  - 18.032 (Yahoo) or 19.874 (XE) or 20.113 (Oanda) córdobas (January 3, 2009)
  - 18.032 córdobas (June 19, 2008)
  - 18.032 córdobas (April 24, 2007)
  - 17.066 córdobas (June 5, 2006)
  - 17.1754 córdobas (January 13, 2006)
  - 16.300 córdobas (April 2005)
  - 15.5515 córdobas (December 2003)
- €1 =
  - 38.899 (XE) (November 2024)
  - 37.084 (XE) (July 2019)
  - 36.9441 (XE) (October 23, 2018)
  - 30.0562 (Yahoo) or 30.0772 (XE) or 29.5661 (Oanda) (January 10, 2010)
  - 29.3674 (Yahoo) or 29.3721 (XE) or 28.93586 (Oanda) córdobas (August 4, 2009)
  - 25.1033 (Yahoo) or 27.532 (XE) or 28.008 (Oanda) córdobas (January 3, 2009)
  - 29.8987 córdobas (June 19, 2008)
  - 24.583 córdobas (April 24, 2007)
  - 22.1168 córdobas (June 5, 2006)
  - 19.910 córdobas (January 2006)
  - 21.361 córdobas (April 2005)
  - 19.6462 córdobas (December 2003)

== See also ==
- Economy of Nicaragua

== Sources ==
- Krause, Chester L.; Clifford Mishler (1991). Standard Catalog of World Coins: 1801–1991 (18th ed.). Krause Publications. ISBN 0873411501.
- Pick, Albert (1994). Bruce, Colin R. II; Shafer, Neil (eds.). Standard Catalog of World Paper Money: General Issues (7th ed.). Krause Publications. ISBN 0-87341-207-9.and in the reference of tomorrow die
