= Nicaragua and the World Bank =

Nicaragua and the World Bank details the relationship between the state of Nicaragua and the World Bank and its antecedents.

== History ==
Nicaragua first entered into the World Bank when it signed the IBRD Articles of Agreement in 1946 along with other Latin American countries such as El Salvador and Panama. In 1951, Nicaragua took its first loan from the World Bank in the form of the Highway Project. The goal of the Highway Project was to finance the construction of 266 kilometers of paved roads in order to facilitate the economic growth of Nicaragua. The creation of reliable roads helped open up new sections of land to agricultural development in Nicaragua. The Nicaraguan Revolution from 1979 to 1990 led to troubles with the World Bank as in 1984, Nicaragua became the first country to go into nonaccrual status with the IBRD. An onset of debt issues during the Nicaraguan Revolution led to a nonaccrual status with the IBRD and prompted fears of repayment issues. After the Nicaraguan Revolution, Nicaragua signed the MIGA Articles of Agreement in 1992 making it the 81st member of this group within the World Bank. The Multilateral Investment Guarantee Agency (MIGA) was created to promote foreign investment in developing countries by providing insurance and credit enhancement to lenders and investors. The World Bank continues to operate in Nicaragua and notes that political unrest in 2018 has caused the economy to contract 3.8 percent prompting concerns that recent efforts to combat poverty levels will be undermined.

== Recent projects ==
The World Bank continues to be heavily involved in Nicaragua. From 2018 to 2022, Nicaragua's Country Partnership Strategy (CPF) will be the main pathway to addressing poverty and creating prosperity for its citizens. The main goals of the CPF is to enable private investment, invest in human capital, and to strengthen public institutions to support risk management. One of the World Bank projects that falls under this mission is the Integrated Public Provision of Health Care Services project. The goal of the Integrated Public Provision of Health Care Services Project is to extend the coverage of health care to less advantaged groups while also increasing the quality of the health care. The cost of this World Bank project is sixty millions U.S. dollars. The loan will be used to finance consulting, training, and operation costs in order to support the goals of the project. Another modern project from the World Bank is the Rural and Urban Access Improvement Project which seeks to improve the accessibility of markets in rural areas through the development of roads and the strengthening of road management institutions. The cost of this project is $96.80 million. Another main component of this project is to make resources available to the Nicaraguan government in the case of a crisis or emergency that warrants the use of the provided funds.
