= Central Bank of Nicaragua =

Central Bank of Nicaragua Banco Central de Nicaragua
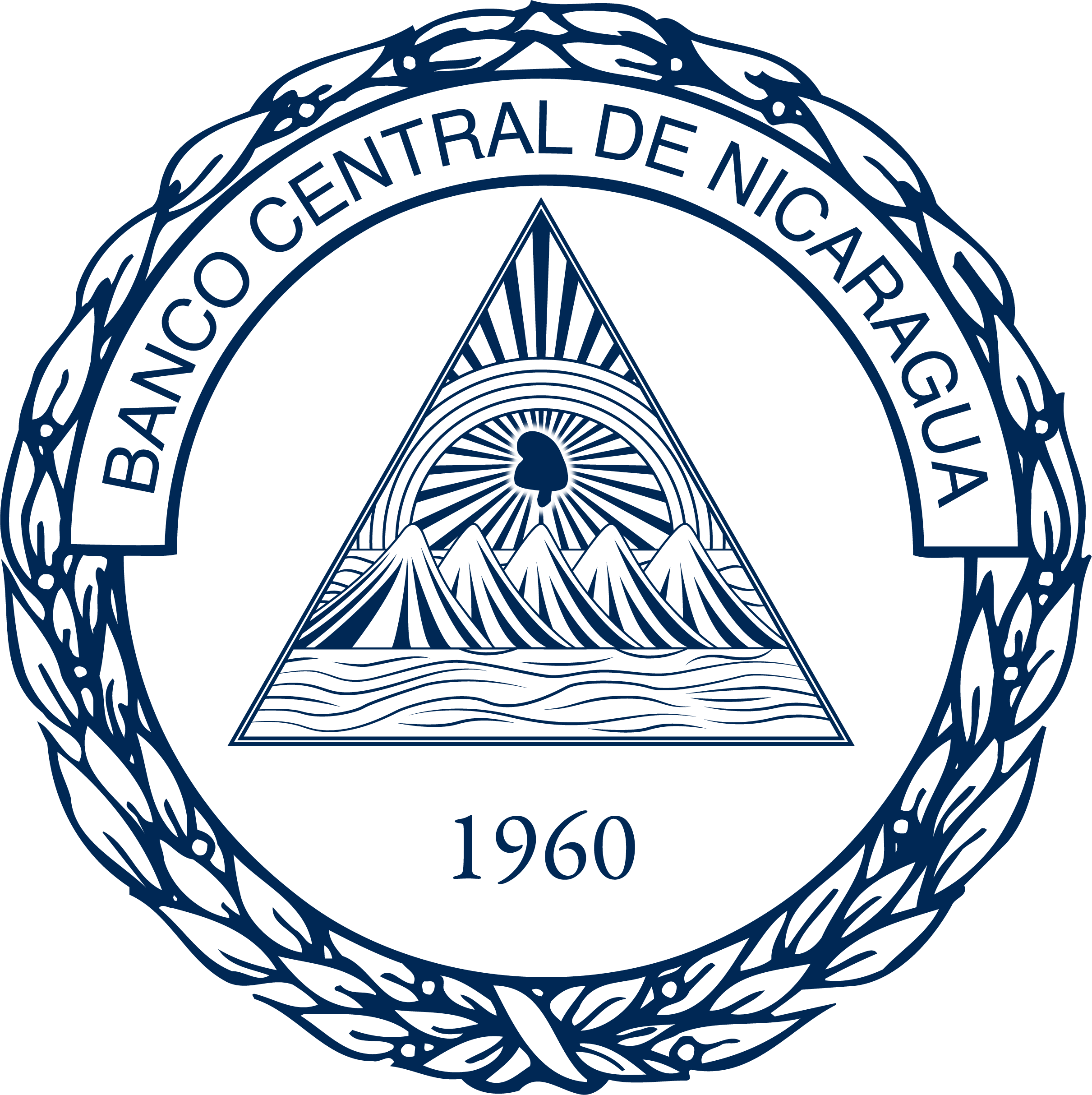
- Central bank of: Nicaragua
- Headquarters: Managua, Nicaragua
- Established: 16 September 1960 (legal); 1 January 1961 (commenced operations)
- Ownership: 100% state ownership
- President: Leonardo Ovidio Reyes Ramírez
- Currency: Nicaraguan córdoba NIO (ISO 4217)
- Reserves: 2 350 million USD
- Website: www.bcn.gob.ni

The Central Bank of Nicaragua (Spanish: Banco Central de Nicaragua) is the central bank of Nicaragua.

== History ==
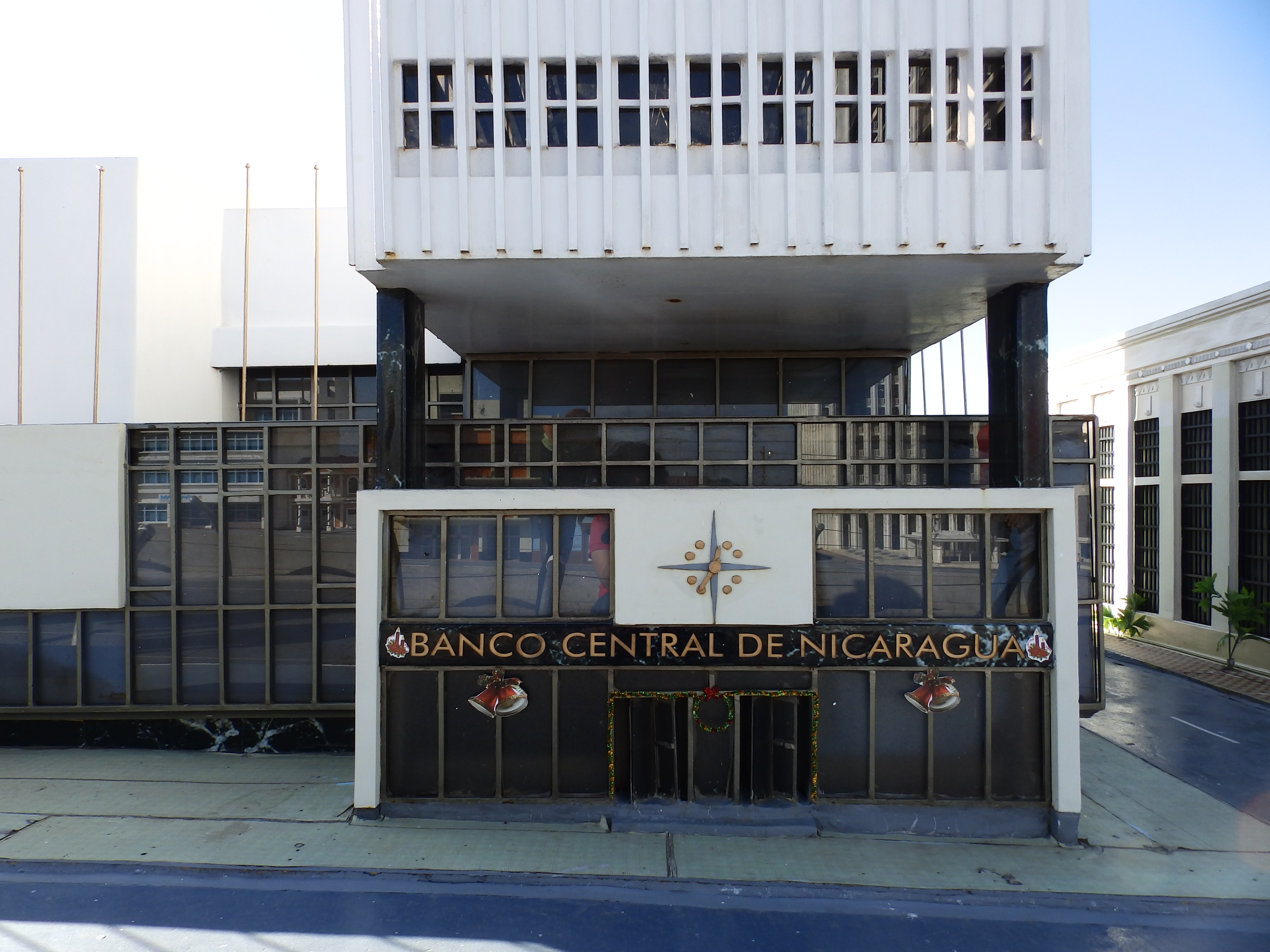

The bank was established in 1960 and commenced operations on 1 January 1961.

== Presidents ==
- Francisco Laínez Matamoros, January 1961 - May 1968
- Gustavo A. Guerrero, May 1968 - June 1969
- Roberto Incer Barquero, August 1969 - July 1979
- Arturo Cruz Porras, July 1979 - May 1980
- Alfredo Alaniz Downing, May 1980 - June 1981
- Alfredo César Aguirre, June 1981 - May 1982
- Luis Enrique Figueroa, May 1982 - August 1985
- Joaquín Cuadra Chamorro, August 1985 - April 1990
- Francisco Mayorga, April 1990 - October 1990
- Raúl Lacayo Solórzano, October 1990 - January 1992
- Silvio De Franco Montalván, January 1992 - September 1992
- José Evenor Taboada, October 1992 - January 1997
- Noel Ramírez Sánchez, January 1997 - January 2002
- Mario Alonso Icabalceta, January 2002 - May 2006
- Mario Arana Sevilla, May 2006 - January 2007
- Antenor Rosales Bolaños, January 2007 - February 2012
- Alberto Guevara Obregón, February 2012 - January 2014
- Leonardo Ovidio Reyes Ramírez, January 2014 -

== See also ==
- Banking in Nicaragua
- Nicaraguan córdoba
- Economy of Nicaragua
- List of central banks
