= Kola Shaler =

Nicaraguan soda brand

- Type: Cola
- Manufacturer: Kola Shaler Industrial
- Origin: Nicaragua
- Introduced: 1904
- Related products: Coca-Cola, Pepsi

Kola Shaler is a cola soft drink manufactured in Nicaragua, invented by David Robleto Alemán in 1904. Today, the drink is manufactured in Managua by Kola Shaler Industrial SA. Kola Shaler has been described as one of the "pioneers" in the soft drink industry in Nicaragua due to its longevity and continued popularity.

== History ==
Kola Shaler was launched in 1904 by David Robleto Alemán, in his native city of León, Nicaragua. Robleto Alemán devised the name "Shaler", intending it to resonate with the popular soft drinks of the era, most of which bore English or German monikers. He believed that brands with Spanish names couldn't compete with drinks with English or German names.

In 1925, Kola Shaler moved production to Managua, the country's capital. The original Managua factory withstood one earthquake, in 1931, before being ultimately destroyed in the 1972 Nicaraguan earthquake, which leveled an estimated 70% of the city.

Post the earthquake, Aurora Robleto de Cárdenas, the daughter of the factory's founder, Robleto Alemán, worked with her husband to salvage the undamaged machinery and established a new factory in the eastern region of Managua. As of 2022, the factory continues to be operational.

In July 2022, the Kola Shaler factory was recognized as a historic business by Reyna Rueda, the Mayor of Managua.

Kola Shaler ingredients are imported from England. Since 2004, the drink's recipe remains the same till date.

== Cultural impact ==
In 2004, the brand celebrated its 100-year anniversary. Popular Nicaraguan newspaper La Prensa published a retrospective of the brand to commemorate the occasion, noting that during its production history, Kola Shaler had weathered "two earthquakes, an armed conflict, and the fierce competition of the transnational soft drink business."

Critics have attributed the brand's continued success to nostalgia and brand loyalty, especially among expatriate populations in Florida and California.

It has been called "the other national drink of Nicaragua", after Pinol and Pinolillo."
