= El Castillo del Cacao =

Chocolate company in Nicaragua

El Castillo del Cacao is Nicaragua's first commercial chocolate factory based in Matagalpa, on the outskirts of cacao growing areas of Matiguás and Waslala. It was established in 2005 by a Dutch national who was surprised by the wasting of cacao in the countryside, yet no chocolate in the local supermarkets.

Starting with a 3000 Euro investment, the company now sells chocolate bars throughout Central America.
