= Tip-Top Restaurant =

Nicaraguan restaurant chain

Tip Top
- Industry: Fast food
- Founded: 1959; 67 years ago in Managua, Nicaragua
- Website: www.restaurantestiptop.com

Tip-Top (often referred to as 'Pollo Tip-Top') is a national chain of restaurants in Nicaragua, predominantly selling chicken. It is headquartered in the country's capital city of Managua and is a franchise of Tip Top Industry.

== History ==
Claudio Rosales and Lina Lacayo de Rosales started the business, in Nicaragua, in 1959 with the sale of processed crude chicken, a market of which dominated 70% a long time. The first restaurant was opened in 1959 in the center of old Managua

== Expansion ==
Pollo Tip Top began its expansion in 2004 due to the creation of its tax exemption. The first were established in the cities of Estelí and Chinandega, in Nicaragua, but their goal for 2005 was to expand into Honduras, Panama, Costa Rica, and El Salvador.

== Locations ==
- Nicaragua
- 13 (in Managua)
- 2 (in Matagalpa)
- 3 (in León)
- 2 (in Chinandega)
- 1 (in Bluefields)
- 2 (in Granada)
- 2 (in Estelí)
- 1 (in Juigalpa)
- 1 (in Corn Island)
- 1 (in Nueva Segovia)
- 1 (in Masaya)
- 1 (in Carazo)
- 1 (in Rivas)
- 1 (in Jinotenga)

== See also ==
- List of chicken restaurants
