= Gelateria Italiana =

Ice cream parlor chain in Nicaragua

Gelateria Italiana, S.A
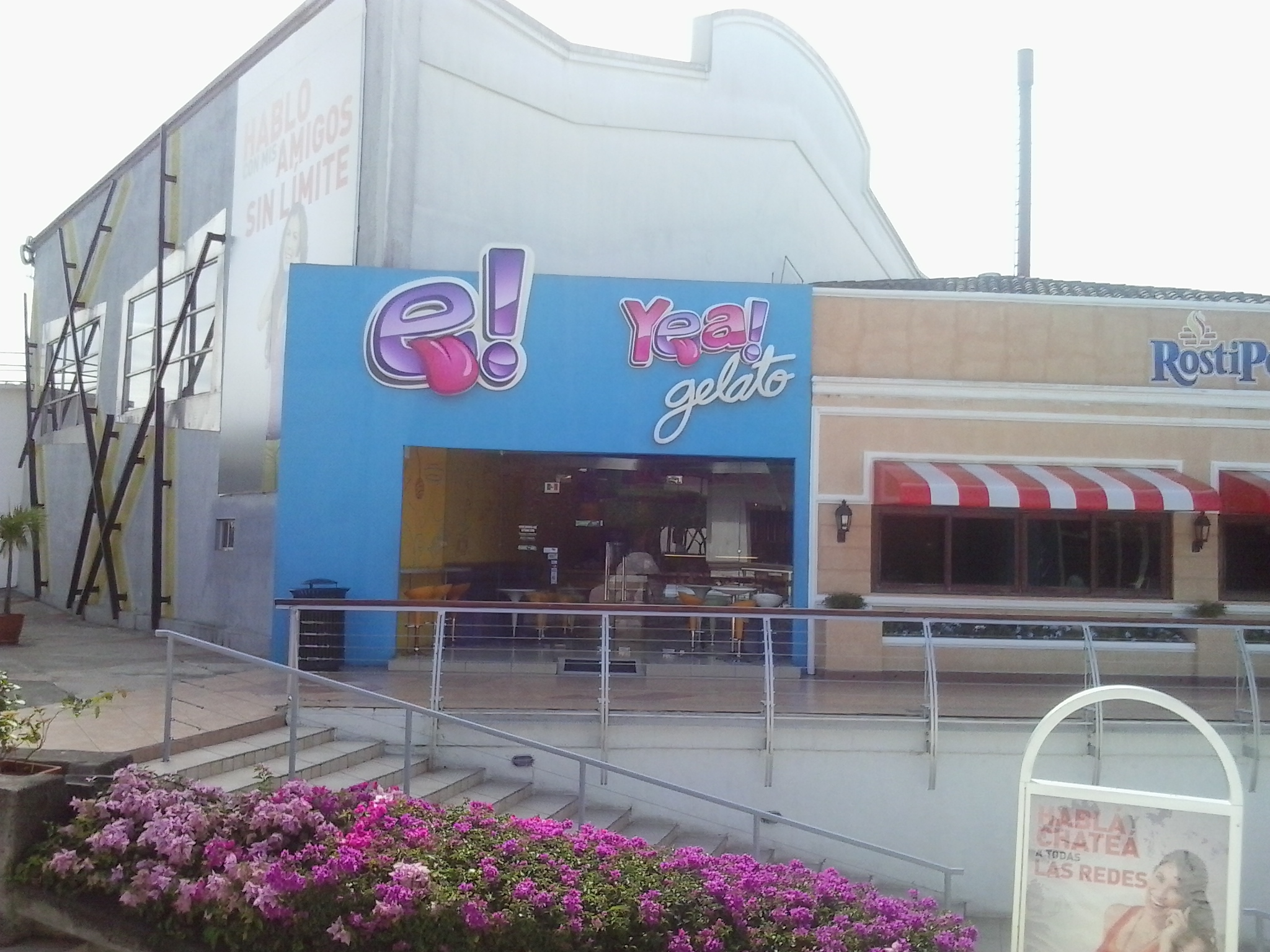
- Industry: Food Processing
- Founded: Managua, Nicaragua (2010)
- Founder: Patricio Lanuza; Adriana Sanint
- Headquarters: Managua, Nicaragua
- Products: Ice cream
- Website: www.yeagelato.com

Gelateria Italiana, S.A. is an ice cream chain that produces and sells the Yea! Gelato brand Italian style ice cream from Managua, Nicaragua.

== History ==
The first Yea! Gelato shop opened on November 24, 2010, in the Galerías Santo Domingo shopping mall in Managua, Nicaragua. Gelateria Italiana sells the Yea! Gelato brand ice cream, a soft ice cream containing little or no air, made with milk, cream, various sugars, and flavoring such as fresh fruit and nut purees.

In addition to the ice cream shops, the more than 100 flavors of the Yea! Gelato brand can also be found at the Supermercados La Colonia and La Unión (Walmart) supermarket chains.

== Yea! Gelato shops ==
- Galerías Santo Domingo
- Metrocentro Managua
- Multicentro Las Américas
- Universidad Centroamericana
