= Banco de la Producción =

Nicaraguan bank

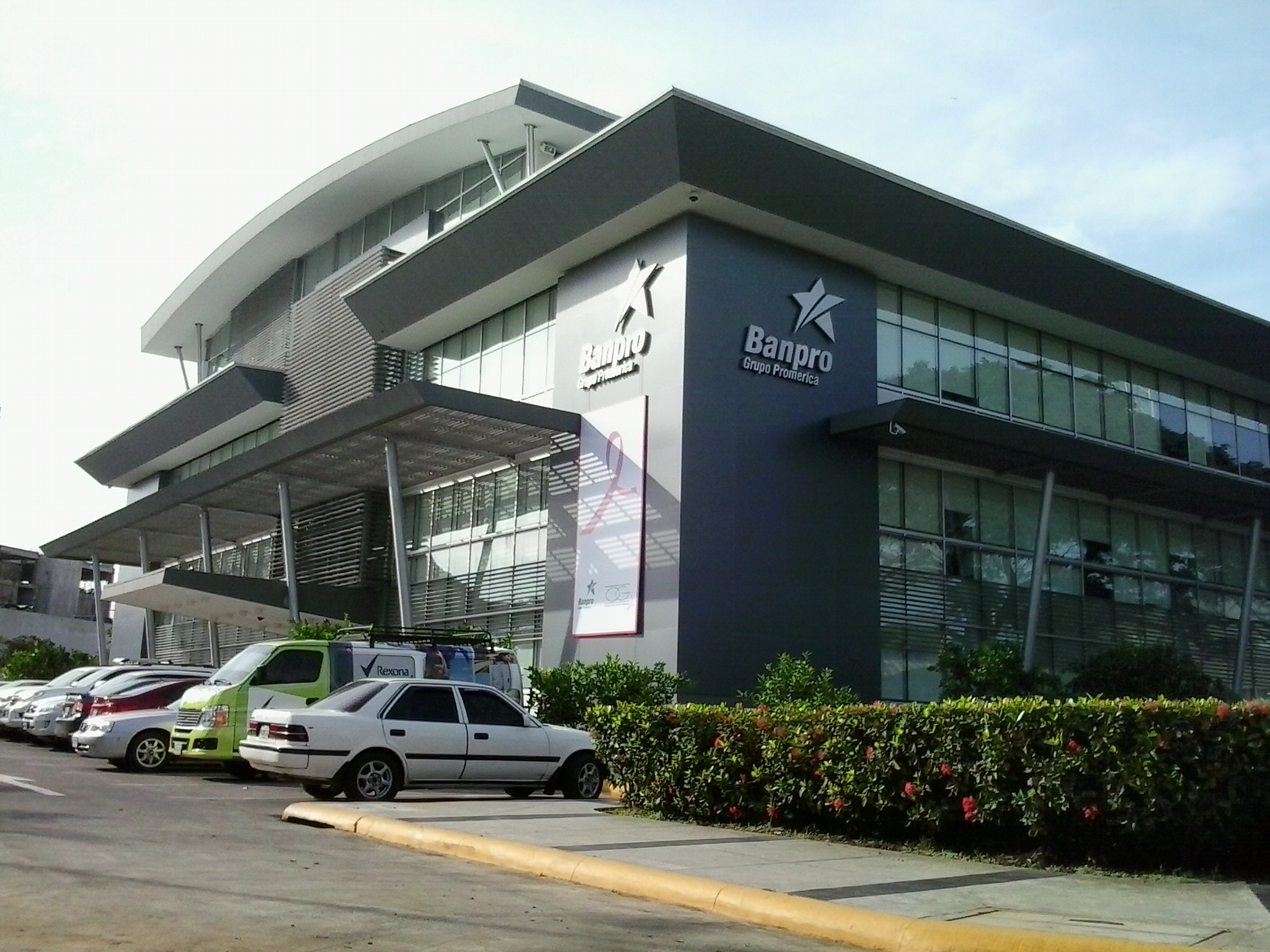
- Company type: Private
- Industry: Financial services
- Founded: Managua, Nicaragua (November 11, 1991)
- Headquarters: Managua, Nicaragua
- Products: Financial services, Banking
- Revenue: ▼US$ 5.203 million (2012)
- Total assets: ▼US$ 1,496.2 million (2012)
- Parent: Grupo Promerica
- Website: www.banpro.com.ni

Banco de la Producción (BANPRO) is a bank in the city of Managua, Nicaragua.

== History ==
BANPRO was founded as a private bank in 1991 in Managua, Nicaragua. During the Nicaraguan banking crisis (2000–2002), BANPRO assumed the performing loans in Banco Intercontinental's (INTERBANK) portfolio, while the Central Bank took over control of the nonperforming loans.
