= Banco del Cafe =

BANCAFÉ
- Native name: Banco del Café
- Company type: Private
- Industry: Banking; Insurance; Pension funds
- Founded: October 16, 1978 in Guatemala City
- Defunct: October 19, 2006; 18 years ago
- Headquarters: Guatemala City
- Products: Retail Banking; Insurance; Investments; Accounting & Payroll; Mortgages; Consumer Finance; Credit cards

Banco del Café (English: Bank of the Coffee), commonly known as Bancafé, was a bank in Guatemala that collapsed because of bad loans and panicked withdrawals set off by an investigation by Guatemala's Superintendencia de Bancos in 2006. This eventually brought the bank down.
