= BAC Credomatic =

Central American financial institution founded in 1952

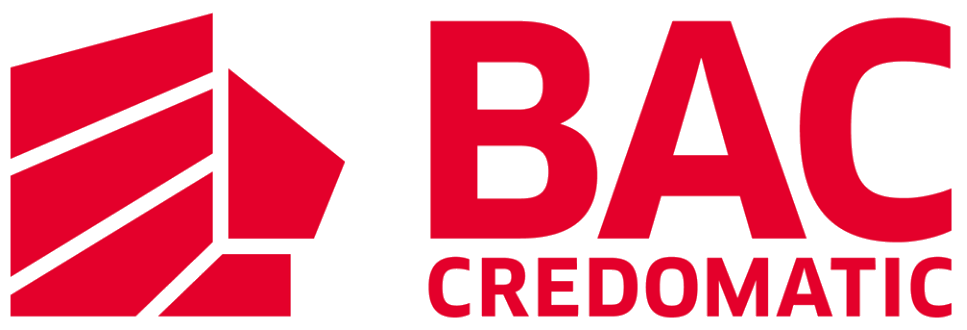
- Formerly: Banco de América Central (BAC)
- Type: Private
- Industry: Financing
- Founded: Managua, Nicaragua (1952)
- Headquarters: San José, Costa Rica
- Key people: Rodolfo Tabash Espinach (CEO)
- Products: Financial services, Banking
- Number of employees: +10,000
- Parent: BAC HOLDING CORP
- Website: www.baccredomatic.com

BAC Credomatic is a financial group in Central America, with operations in Guatemala, El Salvador, Honduras, Nicaragua (where it was founded and former headquarters in the city of Managua), Costa Rica (current headquarters), Panama, Grand Cayman, The Bahamas, and the United States.

== History ==
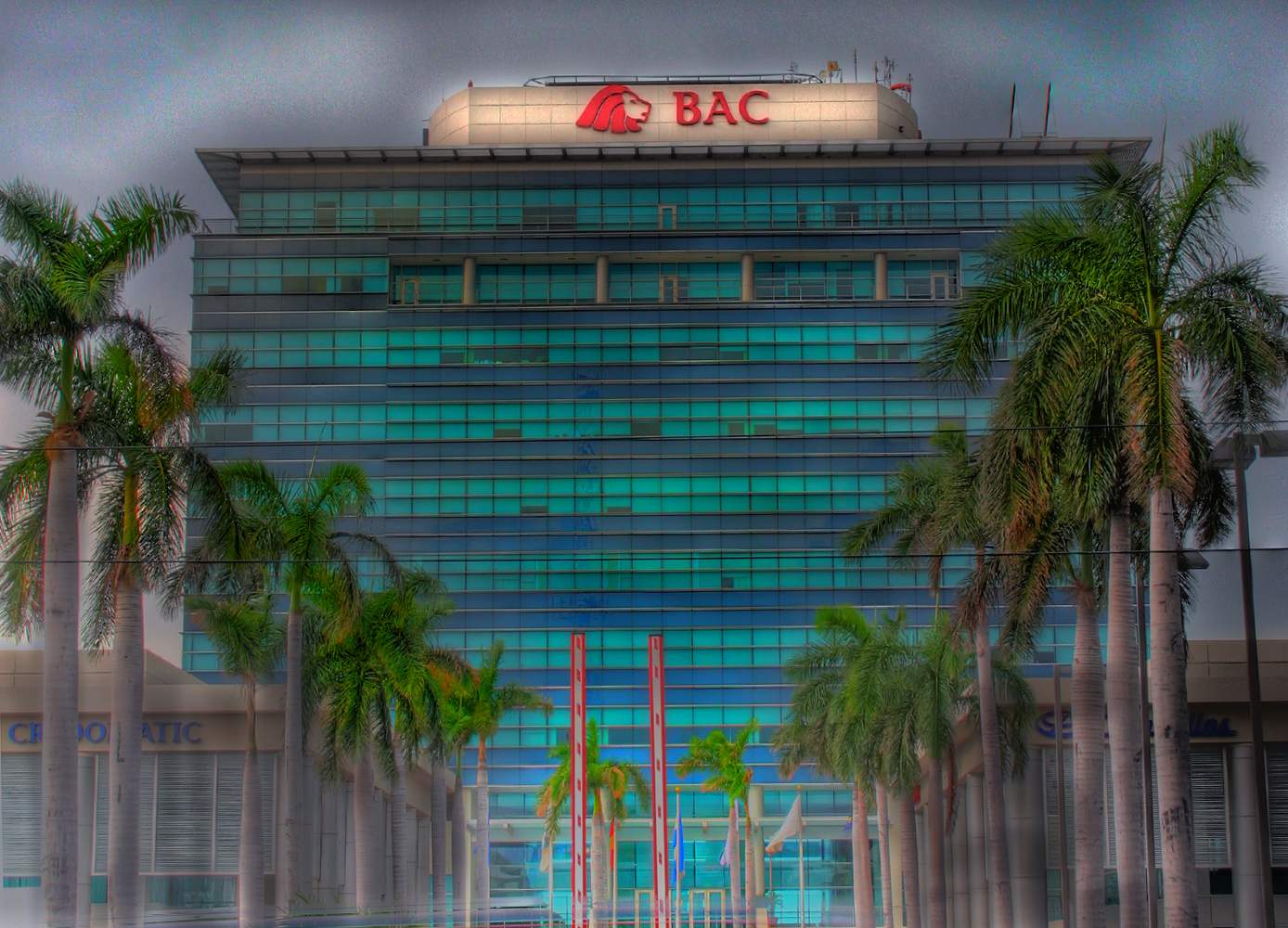
Former BAC building in Managua, 2007

Founded in 1952 in Managua as Banco de América Central, BAC was the forerunner of what is now known as the BAC Credomatic Group (Spanish: Grupo BAC Credomatic). By the 1970s, the bank had ventured into the credit card business using the Credomatic brand.

In the mid-1980s, the Group decided to enter other markets in the region, starting in Costa Rica with the acquisition of what is now known as Banco BAC San José. BAC Credomatic has a presence throughout Central America, as well as in the United States, Cayman Islands and The Bahamas.

In 2004, the Group started its credit card operations in Mexico, which were later sold to Banco Invex in 2016.

In December 2010, Grupo Aval completed the purchase of the BAC Credomatic banking group.

In 2016, Credomatic de México S.A. de C.V., a subsidiary of BAC International Inc., signed a contract to transfer its Mexican credit card business to Banco Invex S.A.

In 2017, the group started using BAC Credomatic as the brand for all its banking and credit card services, adopting a new logo.

== See also ==
Grupo Aval Acciones y Valores
