= Cimarron =

Cimarron may refer to:

== Film and television ==
- Cimarron (1931 film), an Academy Award-winning film starring Richard Dix
- Cimarron (1960 film), a western film starring Glenn Ford directed by Anthony Mann
- Cimarrón (telenovela), a Venezuelan telenovela
- El Cimarrón (film), a Puerto Rican film released in 2007
- Cimarron City (TV series), a 1958-1959 U.S. western television series set in Oklahoma, starring George Montgomery
- The Cimarron Kid, a 1952 western film starring Audie Murphy, directed by Budd Boetticher
- Cimarron Strip (1967–68), a U.S. western television series
- Rose of Cimarron (film), a 1952 Western film starring Mala Powers
- Spirit: Stallion of the Cimarron, a 2002 film produced by DreamWorks Animation

== Music ==
- The Cimarons, a 1967 British reggae band
- El Cimarrón (Henze), a 1970 musical work by Hans Werner Henze
- Cimarron (album), a 1981 album by Emmylou Harris
- "Cimarron", a 1995 song by alternative rock band Come
- Rose of Cimarron (album), a 1976 album and single by country rock band Poco
- Cimarrón (band), a Colombian joropo music and dance group

== Places in the United States ==
=== Populated places ===
- Cimarron, Colorado, an unincorporated community
- Cimarron Hills, Colorado, a census-designated place
- Cimarron, Kansas, a city
- Cimarron, New Mexico, a village
- Cimarron City, Oklahoma, a town
- Cimarron County, Oklahoma, a county
- Cimarron, Texas, an unincorporated community
- Cimarron Township (disambiguation)

=== Other geographical places ===
- Cimarron Territory, a provisional territory in the Oklahoma Panhandle
- Cimarron Lake, a reservoir in Mohave County, Arizona
- Cimarron Ridge, a ridge in Colorado
- Cimarron Range in the Sangre de Cristo Mountains in New Mexico
- Cimarron National Grassland, in southwest Kansas
- Cimarron River (disambiguation)
- Cimarron Turnpike, a highway which runs between Tulsa and Stillwater, Oklahoma
- Cimarron Cutoff, part of the Santa Fe Trail

== Other uses ==
- Cimarrón (drink), or mate, a South American beverage
- Cimarrones, descendants of Africans in the Americas who formed settlements away from slavery
  - Cimarron people (Panama)
- Cimarron (novel), a 1929 novel by Edna Ferber
- USS Cimarron, US Navy ships
- Cadillac Cimarron, an American automobile
- Cimarrón Uruguayo, a breed of dog
- Cimarron Hydroelectric Power Project, a projected dam in El Salvador
- Cimarron Fuel Fabrication Site, a former US nuclear fuel fabrication facility
- Cimarrones de Sonora, a mexican association football team
