= Cimarron Township, Kansas =

Cimarron Township, Kansas may refer to:

- Cimarron Township, Gray County, Kansas
- Cimarron Township, Meade County, Kansas
- Cimarron Township, Morton County, Kansas

== See also ==
- List of Kansas townships
- Cimarron Township (disambiguation)
