= Statue of Philip Sheridan =

Statue of Philip Sheridan may refer to:

- Equestrian statue of Philip Sheridan, Washington, D.C.
- Statue of Philip Sheridan (New York City)
