= Cimarron Township =

Cimarron Township may refer to:

== Kansas ==
- Cimarron Township, Gray County, Kansas
- Cimarron Township, Meade County, Kansas, Meade County
- Cimarron Township, Morton County, Kansas, Morton County

== Oklahoma ==
- See list of Oklahoma townships

== See also ==
- Cimarron (disambiguation)
