= USS Cimarron =

USS Cimarron may refer to the following ships of the United States Navy:

- USS Cimarron (1862) was a gunboat launched in 1862.
- USS Cimarron (AO-22) was an oiler, launched in 1939 and decommissioned in 1968
- USS Cimarron (AO-177) was an oiler, launched in 1979 and decommissioned in 1999
