= Statue of Philip Sheridan (New York City) =

Bronze sculpture of Philip Sheridan in Manhattan, New York, U.S.

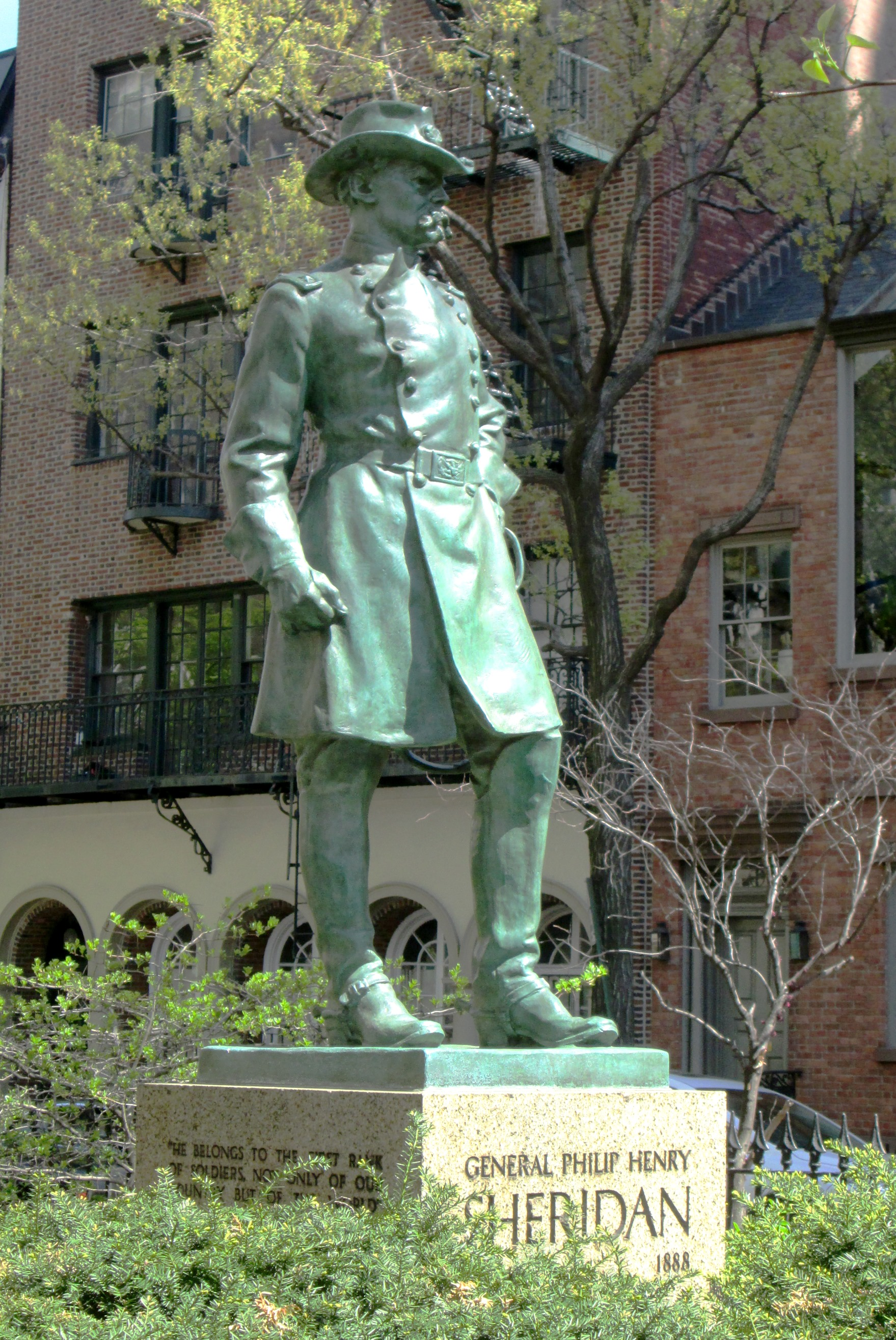
- The sculpture in 2014
- Artist: Joseph Pollia
- Year: 1936
- Type: Sculpture
- Medium: Bronze
- Subject: Philip Sheridan
- Location: Manhattan, New York, United States; 40.73365°N 74.00208°W

General Philip Henry Sheridan, also known as the Sheridan Memorial, is an outdoor bronze sculpture of Philip Sheridan by Joseph Pollia, located in Christopher Park in Manhattan, New York. The statue was installed in 1936.

== See also ==
- 1936 in art
- Sheridan Circle
