= Cimarron River =

Cimarron River may refer to:

- Cimarron River (Arkansas River tributary), a tributary of the Arkansas River with headwaters in New Mexico
- Cimarron River (Canadian River tributary), a tributary of the Canadian River entirely within New Mexico
- Cimarron River (Gunnison River tributary), a tributary of the Gunnison River in Colorado
