= Cimarron Township, Gray County, Kansas =

Cimarron Township
- Township
- Location in Gray County
- Coordinates: 37°47′35″N 100°19′27″W
- Country: United States
- State: Kansas
- County: Gray

Area
  - Total: 98.28 sq mi (254.54 km^{2})
  - Land: 98.25 sq mi (254.47 km^{2})
  - Water: 0.027 sq mi (0.07 km^{2}) 0.03%
- Elevation: 2,598 ft (792 m)

Population (2020)
  - Total: 2,418
  - Density: 24.61/sq mi (9.502/km^{2})
- GNIS feature ID: 0471651

Cimarron Township is a township in Gray County, Kansas, United States. As of the 2020 census, its population was 2,418.

== Geography ==
Cimarron Township covers an area of 98.28 square miles (254.5 km^{2}) and contains one incorporated settlement, Cimarron, which is also the county seat.

== Transportation ==
Cimarron Township contains one airport or landing strip, Cimarron Municipal Airport.
