= Climate change in Nicaragua =

Climate change in Nicaragua carries significant implications for the Central American country as its geographical and systemic features make it extremely vulnerable. Climate change will cause Nicaragua to become hotter and drier during the 21st century. Along with temperature increase, climate change will bring an increased risk of natural disasters, like hurricanes and floods.

The impacts on the natural environment in Nicaragua will carry social and economic effects. Nicaragua's agricultural sector, especially smallholder farmers, will face challenges. The production of Nicaragua's largest export, coffee, is one of the agricultural sectors that will be impacted. As with other countries in Central America, the effects of climate change are thought to be a contributing factor to emigration from Nicaragua.

Nicaragua has outlined strategies for climate mitigation and has participated in climate conventions and agreements. Nicaragua's 2022 National Climate Change Policy describes climate policies to achieve adaption. However, Nicaragua faces challenges in implementing climate change related policy.

== Impacts on the environment ==
=== Natural disasters ===
Part of Nicaragua's vulnerability to the effects of climate change is a result of its geographical location and geological features. Nicaragua is one of the most at-risk countries for natural disasters, ranking third among other Central American countries for the number of disasters between 1950 and 2016. Nicaragua is more likely to be exposed to extreme climate events, like floods, hurricanes, and droughts, which are projected to increase in frequency as a result of climate change.

Tropical cyclones pose a significant and consistent threat to Nicaragua, as its location increases its exposure to these events. In recent decades, the strength and wetness of tropical cyclones has increased, which scientists attribute to warming temperatures that impact both ocean and air temperature. Hurricanes in Nicaragua have been extremely destructive, notably Hurricane Mitch in 1998 and the Eta and Iota hurricanes of 2020. As hurricanes are predicted to intensify in Nicaragua, measures to minimize risk following natural disasters is recommended by scientists.

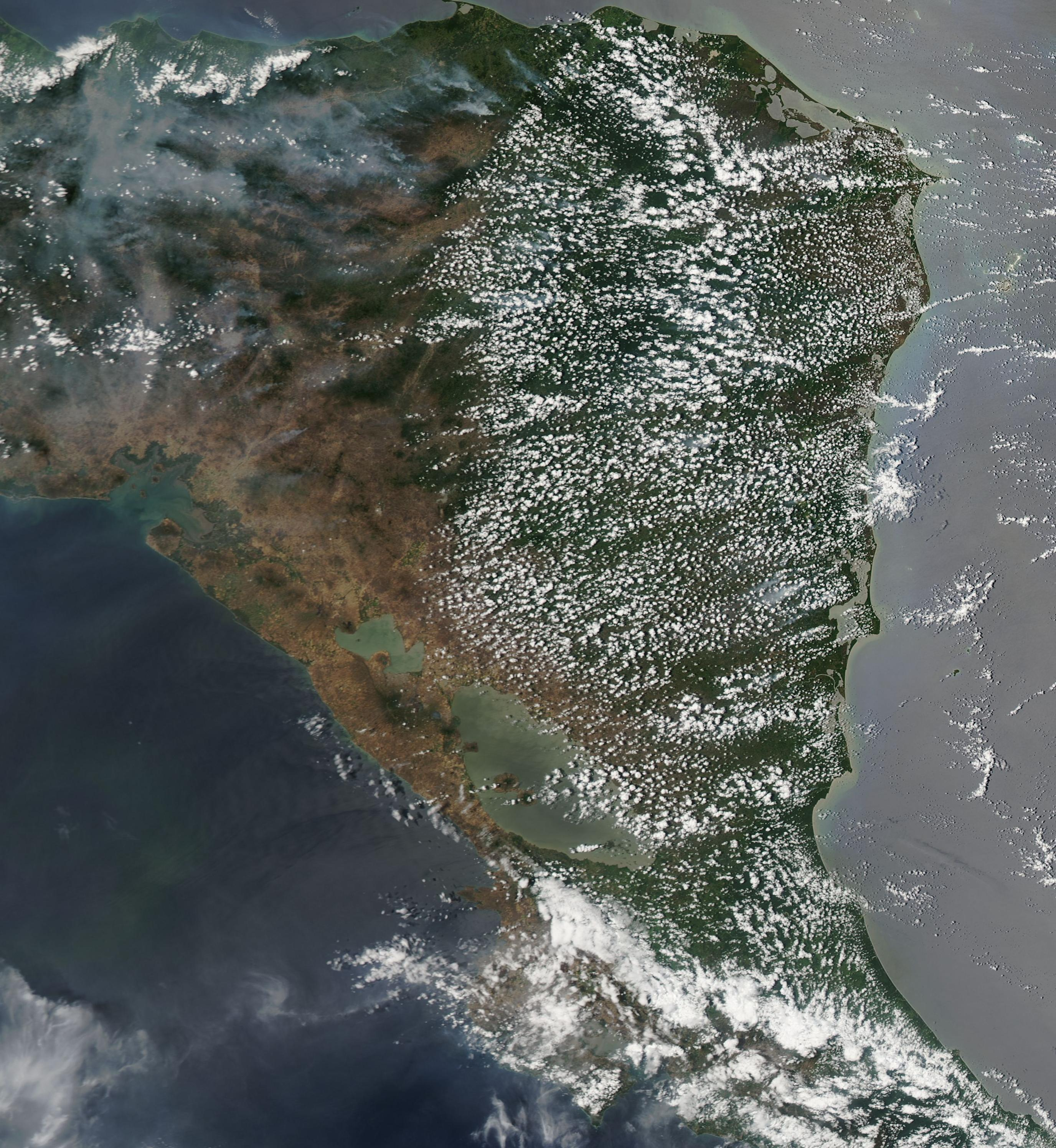
Satellite image of drought conditions in Nicaragua, 2015.

=== Temperature and precipitation ===
Given the sensitive geographical position of Nicaragua, it is predicted to be subject to a larger increase in average temperature. It is already determined that since 1950 the average temperature has risen by 1 °C. This temperature increase is estimated to triple or quadruple in the next 100 years. Precipitation in the region is expected to decrease as the effects of climate change take hold. This decrease is especially significant for regions in Nicaragua that rely on certain climate conditions, like regions engaged in coffee production.

== Impacts on people ==
=== Agriculture and the coffee industry ===
In 2022, 28% of Nicaragua's workforce was employed in agriculture. The agriculture sector was responsible for 15% of the GDP in 2023. Climate change threatens agricultural productivity, and maize, bean, and coffee crops are already being impacted. Nicaragua's GDP is likely to be damaged by climate change effects, with estimates that a 1 °C increase in temperature translates to a 1% decrease in productivity growth. The coffee industry is extremely important in Nicaragua, contributing significantly both to GDP and employment. Over 50% of agricultural employment is related to coffee production in Nicaragua. Additionally, smallholder coffee farmers are far more common. These farmers are more vulnerable to industry adversity, thus any climate change related agricultural loss will impact their livelihood. The coffee zones of Nicaragua are predicted to experience both precipitation declines and hotter temperatures by 2050. These estimates carry threatening implications for coffee farming. Temperature increases and a lack of precipitation will damage coffee production and quality, as the area that can support coffee production will narrow. This has led to some farmers experimenting with different varieties to make their crops more resilient.

=== Displacement ===
Adverse effects of climate change could result in increased migration from Nicaragua. Globally, it is estimated that up to 216 million people could be displaced by climate change by 2050. In Nicaragua, added stress on agricultural and food systems as a result of increased droughts and rainfall could drive environmental migrants. Populations dependent on income from agriculture may be displaced as climate change harms crops and livestock. Migration motivated by climate is a trend already seen in regions like Mexico during periods of crop failure, and environmental migrants from Nicaragua may become more common as climate change disrupts food and agricultural systems.

== Mitigation ==
=== Climate justice ===
Nicaragua's ability to adapt to climate change and the accompanying impacts is hindered by its larger condition of poverty. Nearly a quarter of Nicaraguans lived in poverty in 2023 and Nicaragua is considered a low-income country, among the poorest when compared to other Latin American countries. Poverty creates an added challenge of funding climate change-related projects, such as reinforcing houses and buildings for inevitable climate disasters. The burden of climate change will be disproportionate for Nicaragua, especially considering Nicaragua has contributed only 0.01% of global cumulative CO_{2} emissions.

=== National commitments and strategy ===
Climate change policy development and implementation are challenges for the Nicaraguan government. A lack of funding and a focus on other pressing issues, like political stability, create barriers for the government to prioritizing climate mitigation. While Nicaragua has climate change mitigation targets, it does not have a legal framework to reinforce these commitments.

Nicaragua has created official policy documents like the 2022 National Climate Change Policy, which focuses on addressing climate change through health, water management, conservation, and sustainable resource use. The Ministry of the Environment and Natural Resources (MARENA), established in 1979, is Nicaragua's primary government institution that oversees projects and research to address climate change. Nicaragua has created a goal to reduce its emissions by 8% by 2030, aligning with a global net-zero vision. Their strategy to achieve this goal involves strengthening their renewable energy sector and protecting their forests.

Nicaragua is part of many climate-related agreements, including the Climate-Resilient Sustainable Agriculture Strategy for the SICA Region 2018-2030, which outlines mitigation strategies. Nicaragua ratified the Kyoto Protocol in 1999 and ratified the Paris Agreement in 2017. The country initially did not ratify the agreement, due to its climate envoy Paul Oquist's opposition to the voluntary nature of nationally determined contributions.
