= Coffee in Nicaragua =

Coffee in Nicaragua may refer to:

- Coffee production in Nicaragua
- Coffee consumption in Nicaragua
