= Water resources management in Nicaragua =

- Withdrawals by sector 2000: Domestic: 14.62%; Agriculture: 83.03%; Industry: 2.3%
- Renewable water resources: 189.7 km^{3} (45.5 cu mi)
- Surface water produced internally: 192.6 km^{3} (46.2 cu mi)
- Groundwater recharge: 59 km^{3} (14 cu mi)
- Overlap shared by surface water and groundwater: 55 km^{3} (13 cu mi)
- Renewable water resources per capita: 34,692 m^{3}/a (1,225,100 ft^{3}/a)
- Wetland designated as Ramsar sites: 405,691 ha (1,002,480 acres)
- Hydropower generation: 10%

Water resources management in Nicaragua is carried out by the National water utility and regulated by the Nicaraguan Institute of water. Nicaragua has ample water supplies in rivers, groundwater, lagoons, and significant rainfall. Distribution of rainfall is uneven though with more rain falling on an annual basis in the Caribbean lowlands and much lower amounts falling in the inland areas. Significant water resources management challenges include contaminated surface water from untreated domestic and industrial wastewater, and poor overall management of the available water resources.

The legal framework has historically been fundamentally flawed by a lack of specific water laws and regulations with numerous agencies sharing management duties. There was a 1998 reform aimed a specifying management roles for each of the management institutions and a National Water Law was approved in 2007 that focuses on water resources and regulates water use of different sectors.

== Water management challenges ==
Although water covers ten percent of Nicaragua's surface, environmental degradation, pollution, and simple scarcity in some regions threaten the country's ability to provide potable water to sustain its population and productivity. Today, nearly a third of Nicaraguans do not have access to potable water. In rural areas, where 72% of people lack such access, citizens must often procure their water from shallow wells, rivers, streams, and lakes that are polluted with residential sewage, pesticides, and industrial toxins. Although 93% of urban residents can claim to have either legal or illegal water connections, cities are subject to frequent water outages, particularly during the dry season.

Many of the problems in water management were due to the lack of a national water sector and national water law before the passing of such a law in 2007. Lack of technical capacity and inconsistent leadership of water resource management institutions is a significant and ongoing challenge.

Deforestation, with its devastating environmental consequences, is a serious problem. Deforestation accelerates soil erosion, decreases the amount of recharge to aquifers by increasing surface runoff, damages barrier reefs and ecosystems, increases turbidity which affects mangroves, decreases agricultural production, and causes increased maintenance of water infrastructure. Decades of land abuse and environmental neglect exacerbated the devastation of Hurricane Mitch (1998), where deforestation played a major role.

=== Competing demands ===
The nexus between competing demands such as irrigation, navigation, and hydroelectric potential has created management challenges and conflicts between these sectors. Conflicts with water use are one of barriers whenever a plan for hydroelectric power or construction of an inter-oceanic canal is presented. This point is especially poignant since between 300 and 400 m^{3}/s of the existing river flow is already used to meet the requirements for potable water and irrigation of suitable farmland in the Pacific Region of Nicaragua.

There are 742,000 hectares (1,830,000 acres) of land suitable for irrigation in León-Chinandega plain. However, a proposed plan to irrigate this land would appropriate yet more water from Lake Colcibolca and further reduce its ability to supply enough water for navigation and existing irrigation projects in the surrounding region.

Other aspects to be considered with this idea are the adverse effects on aquatic life of the San Juan River, lakes Managua and Colcibolca, the existing flora and fauna in the area that would be flooded by a proposed dam in the plan, and the environmental impact of the dam construction and all of the other related works. There is a conflict in the use of water for this irrigation project because the more area that is irrigated, the less water that is available for power generation and drinking water supply.

=== Dispute with Costa Rica over the San Juan River ===
Dating back two hundred years, there have been disputes over the management and usage of the San Juan River forming a border between Nicaragua and Costa Rica. The San Juan River has also long been thought by both countries as offering the promise for another canal route across Central America. This was the case when the Panama Canal site was chosen rather than the San Juan River as the ultimate ship navigation route across the Americas.

The conflict between Nicaragua and Costa Rica continues. The Nicaraguan government announced in August 2009 that it will begin construction at the end of September 2009 to reroute the San Juan River. The head of the committee for development of the San Juan River in Nicaragua said that the $1 million project is intended to "recover the 1,700 cubic meters per second of water that was lost after Costa Rica rerouted it toward its Colorado River between 1945 and 1950."

Costa Rica responded, issuing a statement that said a ruling by an international court "forcefully denies Nicaragua's wish to dredge a new route on the San Juan River." In July 2009, the United Nations’ International Court of Justice (ICJ) unanimously reaffirmed Nicaragua's sovereignty over the river and upheld the ban that does not allow Costa Rican police and military forces to use the river. Nicaragua's exclusive sovereignty over the San Juan River was established in 1858 with the Cañas-Jerez treaty.

According to the 151-year-old Cañas-Jerez treaty, the San Juan River is fully Nicaraguan property. Costa Rica can use the river freely for transport, without any restrictions from its neighbouring country. Costa Rica says Nicaragua is reneging on its obligations by requiring visas and forcing Costa Rican boats to stop for military inspection on the northern bank. All passengers are made to pay a $5 fee and every boat must fly the Nicaraguan flag. Nicaragua also banned commercial fishing by Costa Rican fisherman in retribution of Costa Rica initiating the ICJ suit in 2005.

== Water resource base ==
San Juan River
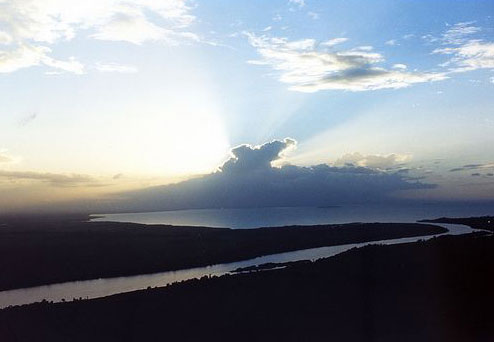

The wet or rainy season in Nicaragua lasts from May until October, while December through April is dry. Average rainfall in the country is about 80 inches per year. The Pacific region which covers the Pacific rim and portions of the San Juan River receive lower mean rainfall totals ranging between 40 and 60 inches per year.

Groundwater is abundant and the capital city of Managua is completely supplied by subterranean resources including 'lagoons' or water that has infiltrated through Volcano craters. The Atlantic and Caribbean sloping lowlands receive between 100 and 255 inches of rainfall per year making stormwater runoff and flooding a considerable challenge.

=== Groundwater and Surface water resources ===
The availability of surface water varies markedly from east to west. The eastern Atlantic sloping side has water basins covering 15,000 km^{2}, many flowing rivers and abundant water resources overall. Thirteen major watersheds discharge into the Atlantic from this side accounting for 91% of the land area. By contrast, the Pacific slope on the western side of the country has water basins covering only 4,000 km^{2}, rivers less than 20 km in length and with lower flows. There are eight watersheds that account for 9% of the land area and drain to the Pacific Ocean.

Annual internal renewable water resources stand at 189.7 km^{3} while also featuring 6.9 km^{3} of annually shared water from the San Juan River which forms the border with Costa Rica. Because water has been so abundant and demand is low, there are no treaties for joint utilization. The Cañas-Jerez treaty of 1858 however, established Nicaragua's sovereignty over the San Juan River and has sparked conflict between Nicaragua and Costa Rica over many years.

The potential of abundant groundwater is much greater on the Pacific side and relatively lower in the Central and Atlantic regions. On the Pacific side, permeable volcanic soil favors water infiltration and the formation of aquifers or "lagoons" with great output potential. In an average year, 42 km^{3} of water infiltrates these aquifers, and 16 km^{3}/year can be easily exploited for use.

=== Major lakes & reservoirs ===
Lake Nicaragua
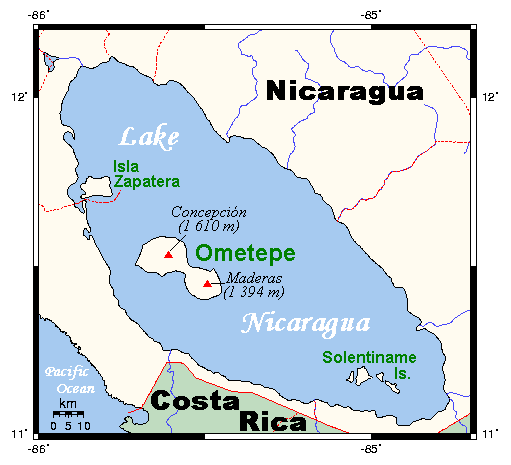
- Concepción on Ometepe island

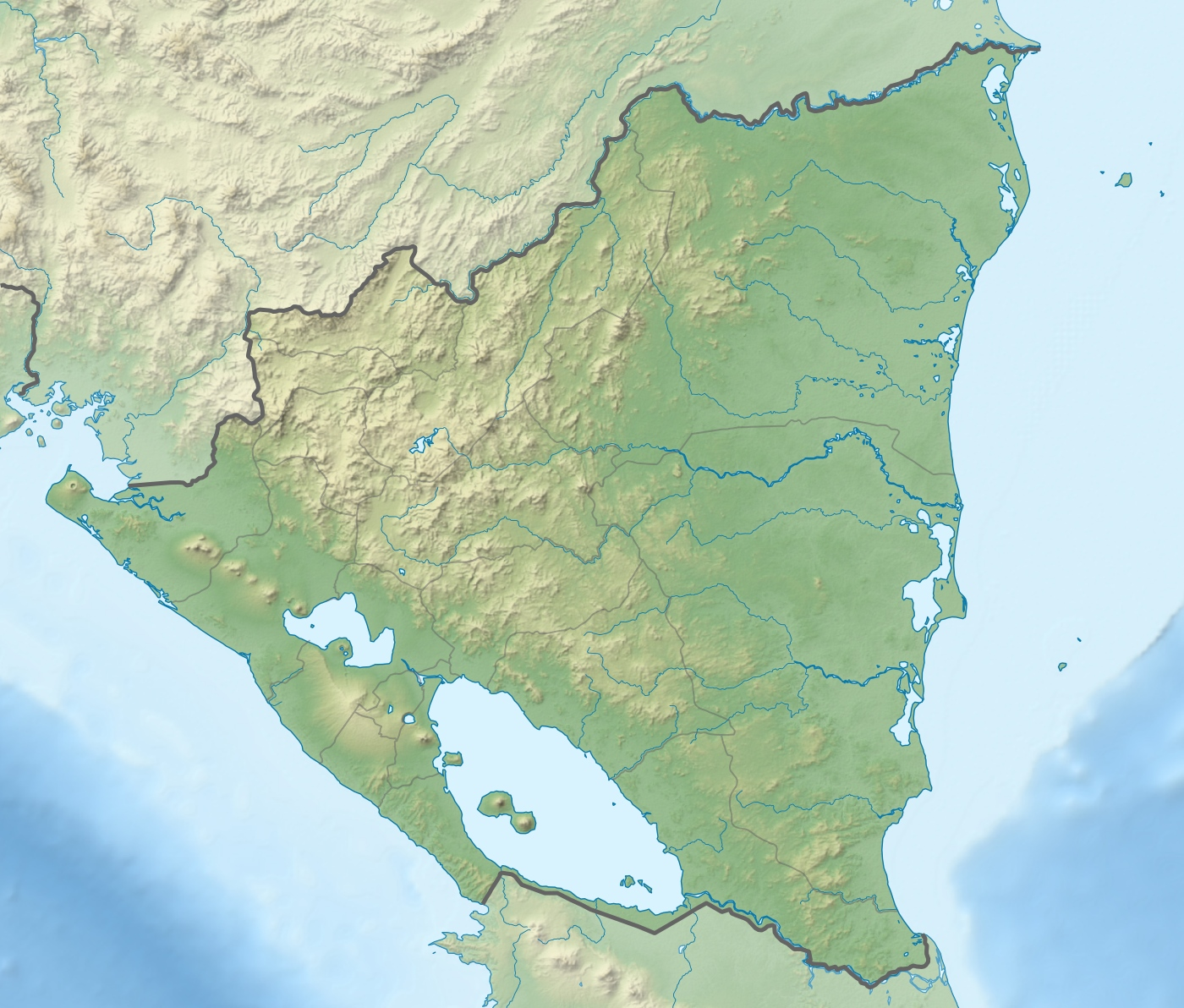
- Location within Nicaragua Location within Central America
- Coordinates: 11°37′N 85°21′W
- Primary outflows: San Juan River
- Catchment area: 23,844 km^{2} (9,206 sq mi)
- Basin countries: Nicaragua
- Surface area: 8,264 km^{2} (3,191 sq mi)
- Max. depth: 26 m (85 ft)
- Water volume: 108.00 km^{3} (87,560,000 acre⋅ft)
- Surface elevation: 32 m (105 ft)
- Islands: 400+ (Ometepe, Zapatera, Solentiname)

Nicaragua's wealth of surfacewater is located in the two largest lakes in Central America. Lake Managua or "Xolotlán" is 1,052.9 km^{2} and is 37.8 meters above sea level and is quite contaminated. The other lake is the very large Lake Nicaragua or Cocibolca and has an area of 8,143.7 km^{2}. Lake Colcibolca occupies the middle section of the tectonic valley shared with two other watersheds: Lake Xolotlán at upper and the San Juan River. This area forms the largest international drainage basin in Central America, with a total area of 41,600 km^{2}, of which 70% or 29,000 km^{2} are in Nicaraguan territory and 12,600 or 30% in Costa Rica.

Because these two lakes are so big, approximately 3,000 mm (120 in) of water is lost to evaporation each year. Additionally, there are 18 other lakes with nine of those in the Pacific region, another five in the Central region and four in the Atlantic region. There are four reservoirs: three are for hydroelectric purposes and one is for irrigation and fish farming.

=== Water quality ===
Water quality in Nicaragua was monitored from 1971 to 1986. Due to economics, the monitoring ceased in 1986. Since then, the only information available on water quality is obtained from site-specific studies. It has been recommended that an environmental water monitoring system be established for the purpose of monitoring water quality.

Much of the research and data on water quality in Nicaragua is focused on the health and condition of Lake Colicbolca and the San Juan River. This is due to their importance for Nicaragua in terms of water supply, navigation and transportation, hydroelectric potential, and irrigation. Sedimentation, damaging navigation, and untreated wastewater have transformed Lake Colibolca and the San Juan River into highly contaminated waterways and pose a significant challenge to those making efforts to reverse the pollution.

Agricultural practices such as burning of vegetation and stover in the sloping regions around Lake Colcibolca have resulted in significant sedimentation of the lake. The sediments flowing into the lake are volcanic and become clay when introduced with water forming an impermeable layer of sediment throughout the lake. Navigation on the San Juan River and in Lake Nicaragua are affected by the progressive sedimentation of both water bodies. Navigation is also an important source of pollution of the water resources, due to the fact that boats are washed and serviced in both water bodies.

The waterbodies have therefore become depositaries of hydrocarbon residue, agricultural chemicals, basic grains, and excrement from farm and domesticated animals that are transported on these bodies of water. Untreated municipal and industrial wastewater poses a threat to water quality as well. Most of the population discharges its used water in riverbeds, streams, or directly in the lake with no prior treatment. The quality of water in those bodies of water has noticeably deteriorated.

== Water resources management by sector ==
=== Water coverage and usage ===
According to statistics from the Food and Agriculture Organization of the United Nations (FAO), national water coverage of potable water was 63% in 2000. Total annual water withdrawals are approximately 248 m^{3} with 83% of extracted water being used and/or appropriated for agriculture. Non-revenue water losses are also high, whereby more than half of the water is lost due to leaks and broken pipes. Domestic water use is around 14% and the industry sector uses just over 2% of the water.

=== Irrigation and drainage ===
The private sector began irrigating in 1950 in the lowland plains of the Pacific region of Nicaragua where banana and sugar cane plantations are prevalent. From 1980, the state sponsored irrigation development in favor of cooperatives and large organized groups of farmers. Subsidies were in place to cover the full cost of construction, purchasing of equipment, and operation and maintenance of irrigation systems. They introduced spray irrigation systems and by 1985, the area with installed irrigation infrastructure increased to 82,000 ha.

In 1990, irrigated area reached a maximum of 93,000 ha; corresponding to 49,000 ha managed by the private sector and 44,000 ha by the public sector. The majority of irrigated surface area is located in the Pacific region (76%) and 24% in the central region. In 1990, the Government eliminated subsidies and liberated the price of energy. When combined with inefficient equipment, the cost of irrigating increased beyond the point at which farmers could maintain their systems. Consequently, systems were abandoned and then deteriorated. As a result, irrigated area decreased to just 23,000 ha using only surface water to irrigate traditional crops such as banana, sugarcane, and rice.

Despite efforts, a government institution responsible for the activities of irrigation has not been established. There are no irrigation districts in the country either. A study was carried out in 1985 for the irrigation development in the Pacific region and suggested the creation of 14 irrigation districts; however, these suggestions were not implemented. The state does respond to requests from the private sector for investment into the irrigation sector by selecting projects of small and medium producers for financing through the Institute for Rural Development.

Drainage problems are isolated in an area north of the Pacific region where issues of salinity of the soil exist; however, it is not believed there is a great risk to the land under irrigation here. FAO reports that there are no statistics on work carried out in the field of drainage. It is known however, that land in the Central region's Sébaco Valley has been recovered using surface drains and ongoing cleaning of natural drains. The Atlantic region is prone to flooding, therefore, both adequate surface and underground drainage is required. It is estimated that 350,000 ha in Nicaragua require proper drainage.

Table: Potential irrigated area in both the medium and long term and area under irrigation in each Department.

Department	Irrigable area: long term (ha)	Irrigable area: medium term (ha)	Irrigable area with infrastructure (ha)	Irrigated area (ha)
Chinandega-N	1,175	1,175	1,175	1,175
Chinandega-s	90,000	24,609	24,609	20,591
Leon	20,000	3,120	3,120	2,567
Rivas	3,000	50	20	20
Managua-Rivas	20,000	20,200	6,200	5,106
Managua	15,000	2,350	350	350
León-Managua	7,000	2,150	2,150	1,688
Matagalpa	15,000	12,000	8,700	6,090
Chontales	80,000	23,000	11,750	10,250
Río San Juan	20,000	2,097	2,097	2,097
Estelí	2,000	1,194	1,194	1,194
Total	273,175	91,945	61,365	51,128

Source: FAO 1998

=== Stormwater ===
Management of stormwater drainage is major challenge for the Alcaldia of Managua. Sedimentation and the accumulation of solid waste in the conveyance channels are also a constant concern. Investments in environmental protection and stormwater drainage works have been concentrated in one of the eight subwatersheds of the Southern Watershed, where most of the population and the majority of private investment have historically been concentrated. "Subwatershed II" is located entirely within the territory of Managua. Another important subwatershed serving Managua covers 178 km2. It is the most important recharge area of the aquifer that provides drinking water to Managua, with three wellfields producing 60% of the city's water supply.

Urban growth has developed without the use of urban planning instruments and adequate building standards, and without a corresponding increase in municipal services or an extension of the stormwater drainage system, which impacts the ecological regeneration of the subwatershed and the percolation of rainwater into the Managua aquifer. The sediment and solid waste conveyed through the drainage system exposes the lower areas to floods in the rainy season. Additionally, the absence of basic services in the informal settlements causes wastewater to enter the stormwater system.

=== Hydroelectricity ===
Excerpts drawn from Electricity sector in Nicaragua

Hydroelectric plants account for about 10% of the electricity produced in Nicaragua. The public company Hidrogesa owns and operates the two existing plants Centroamérica and Santa Bárbara both of which generate 50 MW.

Nicaragua is a net importer of petroleum and its overdependence on oil products for the generation of electricity has created a long-standing energy crisis. In response, there are now plans for the construction of new hydroelectric plants. In 2006 the Central American Bank for Economic Integration (BCIE) and the Government reached an agreement by which the BCIE will provide US$120 million in the next five years (2007–2012) in order to finance the following hydroelectric projects:

1. the modernization of the Centroamérica and Santa Bárbara plants;
2. development of the Larreynaga hydroelectric project beginning in 2009;
3. US$42–45 million for the design, construction and initial operation of the 21MW Sirena-Los Calpules hydroelectric plant.

Business News Americas reported in the first weeks of 2010 that Nicaragua's government did indeed sign the financing agreement with BCIE for development of the Larreynaga hydroelectric project. The bank will provide up to US$22.9 million, which will supplement the US$36.7 million originally approved for the 17-MW project. The project is located in Jinotega Province about 160 kilometers north of Managua. Spain's Cobra engineering and construction firm began construction of the project in 2009, however, the plant will be operated by state power firm Enel. Project officials have said that Larreynaga will increase the country's physical generation by 2.8 percent and installed capacity by 3.4 percent.

In March 2008 the government of Iran approved a US$230 million credit for the construction of a 70MW hydropower plant by the name of Bodoke on the Tuma River in the northern department of Jinotega. According to press reports the project will be carried out by a state-owned Iranian company with financing from the Iranian Export Bank under an agreement with the Nicaraguan Ministry of Energy and Mines.

== Legal and institutional framework ==
The existing legal framework is inadequate and a lack of consistent institutional capacity does not favor or precipitate the ongoing development of water resources. The National Constitution established the State with responsibility and obligation to regulate the handling of natural resources. The Civil Code recognizes water resources as a public good and this is subject to the rules that also govern the private ownership of land. The Code states that the consumption of water for irrigation purposes is not regulated and the extraction of groundwater is free. The last water bill was presented to the National Assembly for approval in the working agenda in 1999. That proposal introduced the concepts of integrated water resources management (IWRM) and the creation of The Water Authority (ADAGUA).

There is also a lack of good water rights that govern the use of water resulting in confusion about what body or individual has the right to use a particular water resource. Institutions are state agencies and whenever the political atmosphere and leadership change, so does the leadership of the institutions. This constant turnover in leadership does not lend itself to successful management of water resources institutions.

=== Legal framework ===
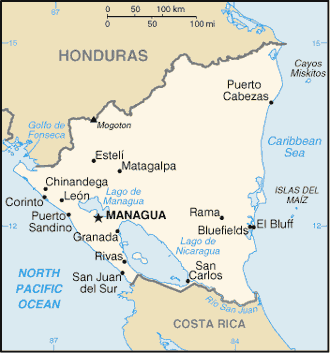
Map of Nicaragua

- The National Water Law of 2007 was approved by the National Assembly and regulates water use by different sectors while prioritizing potable water supplies for domestic use. The Water Law aims to protect and preserve the country's water resources. Furthermore, Nicaragua's congressional environment and natural resources committee has also approved its 2010 work plan giving priority to the creation of the national water authority (ANA). Under the Water Law, ANA will be a decentralized organization, with administrative and financial autonomy. ANA will be responsible for drawing up a national water resources plan, keeping track of water levels in basins, maintaining a public registry of water rights, and promoting the use and development of water resources. The authority is also expected to monitor the construction of water infrastructure. The establishment of ANA has been delayed by 2 years. The delay is due in part for two reasons: 1) implementing the water law is expensive; and 2) there exists disagreements over who should lead that agency.
- General Drinking Water and Sewerage Services Law, Law No. 297 of 1998
- Law-Decree No. 276 of 1998 that created ENACAL
- Law No. 275 of 1998 that transformed INAA into a regulatory agency.

=== Institutional framework ===
- CONAPAS (Comisión Nacional de Agua Potable y Alcantarillado Sanitario) is the National Council for Drinking Water and Sanitation in Nicaragua whose main function is the formulation of the objectives, policies, strategies and guidelines of the sector of drinking water. Created by Executive Decree 51 in 1998 and later modified by Decrees 33 and 75 in 2002 and 2003 respectively. CONAPAS includes the Secretariat of the Presidency SEPRES, the Ministry of Health, the Ministry of Environment, the national utility ENACAL, the regulatory agency INAA, the Institute for Territorial Studies (INETER) and the Social Investment Fund FISE.
- INAA (El Instituto Nicaragüense de Acueductos y Alcantarillados)is the Nicaraguan Institute of water conveyance and sewerage. INAA operates and maintains 148 aqueducts that supply water to 170 cities whereby a majority of the water is supplied from groundwater resources. INAA is the regulator as well and carries out procedures, inspections, and consulting activities in this regard. Other duties include resolving claims, providing technical support, and coordinating efforts with partner associations.
- ENACAL (La Empresa Nicaragüense de Acueductos y Alcantarillados) is the National water and sanitation utility whose duties include implementing water policies, managing the efficient use of both surface and ground water resources that is intended for all uses. Priority is given to sectors less cared for under previous governments.
- MARENA (Ministerio del Ambiente y los Recursos Naturales) is the Ministry of the Environment and Natural Resources and works with the assistance of citizen participation. MARENA has a responsibility to regulate environmental management efforts with effectiveness and efficiency to continually improve the lives of its citizens. MARENA is also charged with the duties of conservation, protection, and sustainable use of Nicaragua's natural resources and environment.
- INETER (Instituto Nicaragüense de Estudios Territoriales) is the agency that assumes responsibility for flood control. In more general terms, INETER is a technical and scientific organization that generates mapping, weather, water, and geologic research data available to the public. The work of INETER is targeted at reducing Nicaragua's vulnerability to flooding resulting from tropical storms and hurricanes.
- Water and Sanitation Committees, CAPS (Comités de Agua Potable y Saneamiento). CAPS manage water and sanitation services in rural areas. They are not legal entities.
- Adagua is the water administration and is within the Ministry of Development. Adagua is commissioned by law to regulate the use and management of the water. In many cases; however, the presence of such an entity has been non-existent.
- Colcibolca Watershed Commission is one component of an institutional base that was set up to protect the Colcibolca basin and help provide for sustainable development of the area. The commission has been operational in some aspects and holds annual "Cocioblca Forums" on a small budget. The Secretariat of this particular watershed commission has no budget and is not a fully functioning body.

== Multi-lateral assistance ==
- World Bank: Dating back to the early 1970s, The World Bank has worked on various water supply projects for the capital city of Managua. Most recently, there is project to increase access to reliable water and sanitation services to the population of the greater Managua region. Components include: 1) securing continuous drinking water; 2) the improvement of water supply and efficiency in selected areas where the Japanese International Cooperation Agency (JICA) has provided a water balance study showing that improvements in water supply can be significant; 3) the institutional strengthening and project monitoring and evaluation. A World Bank project more focused on the entire country is also under way and aims to increase coverage of rural water supply. This project supports municipalities with investments and technical assistance. Pilot water supply projects are another facet of this project and may serve as the basis for larger initiatives in rural water supply. Institutional strengthening and project management is another area of focus in this US$23 million project that was scheduled to be carried until 2014.
- Inter-American Development Bank also has a long history of working in the water resources management sector with Nicaragua. One project underway is contributing to the preservation and sustainable development of a particular subwatershed of Lake Managua's southern watershed. This is being carried out through the execution of infrastructure works and by strengthening the environmental management capacity of participating municipal governments. This is a US$13 million project.
- Ramsar Convention on wetlands instituted a management plan for the conservation and wise use of the Ramsar site Lago de Apanás-Asturias. The project created a management plan for the site, with consultation and active participation of the civil society, government agencies, NGOs and the hydroelectric power station which operates the dam. The management plan identified sustainable development projects benefiting the 25,000 inhabitants of the basin.

== Water users fees ==
The World Health Organization (WHO) reported that user fees in urban centers of Nicaragua were increased annually by ENACAL between 1998 and 2001. Fee increases ranged from 12% to 28%. The fee increases strengthened the finances of ENACAL; however, they also led to civil protests and legal action against a proposed 30% increase for the year 2002. Fees were frozen until 2008 nearly leading ENACAL into bankruptcy. To compensate, the Government of Nicaragua has transferred approximately US$100 million to ENACAL since 2005.

== Ramsar wetland sites in Nicaragua ==
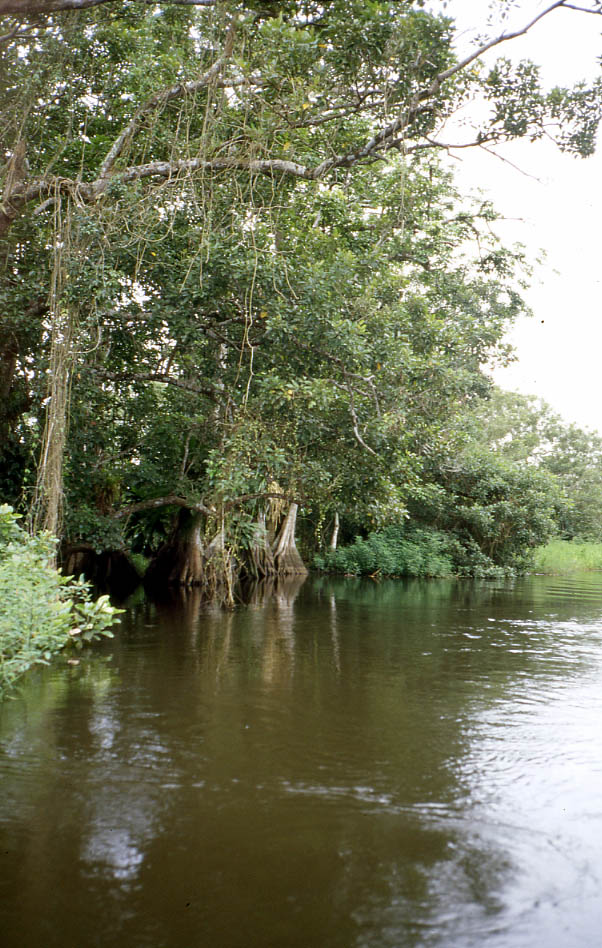
The Los Guatuzos wetlands.

The Ramsar Convention on Wetlands came into force for Nicaragua on November 30, 1997. Nicaragua presently has 8 sites designated as wetlands of international importance, with a total surface area of 405,691 hectares (1,002,480 acres). The wetlands of Nicaragua protect coastal communities from flooding and provide bountiful supplies of fish and beautiful freshwater.

Ramsar wetland sites:

- Cayos Miskitos y Franja Costera Immediata
- Deltas del Estero Real y Llanos de Apacunca
- Lago de Apanás-Asturias
- Los Guatuzos
- Refugio de Vida Silvestre Río San Juan
- Sistema de Humedales de la Bahía de Bluefields
- Sistema de Humedales de San Miguelito
- Sistema Lagunar de Tisma

== Potential climate change impacts ==
It has been proved that climate change will affect Nicaragua sooner rather than later due to its geographic location in the traditional path of strong Atlantic tropical storms and hurricanes. Planning efforts in Nicaragua are directed towards adapting to wider climate variability including stronger storms in some years and more severe droughts in others, and higher temperatures that will provoke increased evaporation. This will lead to even drier years than the Nicaraguan agriculture had already suffered in past decades. Moreover, there is a high deforestation rate in Nicaragua that makes the country even more vulnerable to climate change induced flooding and landslides.

Climate change predictions by the Ministry of National Resources and the Environment in Nicaragua indicate that within this century rainfall will decline by an average of 30%, and temperatures rise by 1-2o C. These changes could effectively eliminate coffee production in the northern pacific slope highlands of Segovias, the highest quality coffee in Nicaragua. Over the past four years the El Niño/La Niña climate cycles have increased infrequency. Cycles having alternated from one year to the next; 2004 and 2006 were low rainfall El Niño years, 2006 having historically low rainfall, while 2005 and 2007 were very high rainfall La Niña years.

== One Drop foundation ==
The Nicaragua project of the One Drop foundation focuses on the Estelí region which is located in the Dry Tropic Zone. The Estelí region is located in the north of Nicaragua and home to 5.5 million people. The area experiences sporadic and intermittent rainfall. This, coupled with a decade-long civil war that destroyed basic infrastructure, resulted in the people living there having little access to safe water. The Nicaragua project (2006–2010) directly impacts 1,200 families and will ultimately benefit approximately 10,000 men, women and children.

=== Progress report ===
Technical and Material Contributions

Energy-efficient stoves: 1,200/1,200

Family Gardens: 1,200/1,200

Grey water filters: 1,230/1,230

Hen houses: 1,200/1,200

Potable water filters: 1,350/1,350

Rehabilitated water wells: 90/90

SchoolGardens: 30/30

Water reservoirs: 120/120

Social Arts and Popular Education

Community activities led: 18/18

Educational and artistic workshops: 281/281

Multidisciplinary touring shows: 202/130

Microfinance

Number of recipients: 1,350 families

== See also ==
- Water supply and sanitation in Nicaragua
- Climate change in Nicaragua
