= Water supply and sanitation in Nicaragua =

Data
- Access to an improved water source: 85% (2010)
- Access to improved sanitation: 52% (2010)
- Share of collected wastewater treated: 42%
- Continuity of supply: 53%
- Average urban water use (L/person/day): 6.50 US$/month
- Annual investment in WSS: 9 US$ /capita
- Share of self-financing by utilities: 16% (1990–99)
- Share of tax-financing: 7% (1990–99)
- Share of external financing: 77% (1990–99)

Institutions
- Decentralization to municipalities: Very limited
- National water and sanitation company: Yes
- Water and sanitation regulator: Yes
- Sector law: Yes (1998)
- No. of urban service providers: 30

Drinking water and sanitation in Nicaragua are provided by a national public utility in urban areas and water committees in rural areas. Despite relatively high levels of investment, access to drinking water in urban areas has barely kept up with population growth, access to urban sanitation has actually declined and service quality remains poor. However, a substantial increase in access to water supply and sanitation has been reached in rural areas.

The water sector underwent major reforms in 1998 that separated policy, regulatory, and operating functions. Decentralization has been proposed for a decade, but implementation was very slow and in mid-2007 was reversed when the national water company took over two municipal systems.

== Access ==
		Urban (57% of the population)	Rural (43% of the population)	Total
Water	Improved water source	98%	68%	85%
Water	Piped on Premises	89%	29%	63%
Sanitation	Improved sanitation	63%	37%	52%
Sanitation	Sewerage (2006 JMP survey & census data)	22%	0%	13%

Source: WHO/UNICEF Joint Monitoring Programme for Water Supply and Sanitation

Access to water supply and sanitation in urban areas of Nicaragua has been declining, since there has been little expansion in access while population levels have increased. Even though the JMP found coverage levels to be at 85% in 2010, the Nicaraguan Water and Sewerage Enterprise (ENACAL), the public utility responsible for provision of water and sanitation services to urban areas, estimates that effective coverage is less than 60 percent due to insufficient and unreliable service. There have been significant improvements in rural areas, however, since 1990. Access to improved water supply in rural areas has increased significantly from 54% in 1990 to 68% in 2010.

Access to improved sanitation in rural areas has increased from 43% in 1990 to 52% in 2010. According to the 2005 census, access to improved water supply in Nicaragua was 77% in 2005, which is lower than the JMP estimate of 83%. Access to improved sanitation was 85% according to the 2005 census which is higher than the JMP estimate of 50%. The difference can be largely explained by the fact that the JMP definition takes into account only improved latrines with a complete structure that are in service, while the census also counts abandoned or traditional latrines.

== Service quality ==
Water supply in 47% of localities monitored by the regulatory agency (46 out of 96 systems) is not continuous. This share is higher in the dry season, between the months of February and May, than in the wet season. Poor quality and efficiency of water service are serious concerns in the Managua region. The existing water supply in Managua cannot meet current demand due to high rates of leakage and wastage, which account for 55% of total water produced and distributed by the system.

Interruptions in service provision are common, with some households receiving service for less than 2 hours per day. Only 42 percent of connections in Managua have meters operating in good condition. Additionally, ENACAL, the national utility responsible for water provision in Managua, has been labelled as "one of the most notorious overbillers in the country".

Bacteriological urban drinking water quality was considered acceptable by the WHO based on samples analyzed by the national utility.

In 2005 CONAPAS estimated that 42% of all collected wastewater in the country was treated. At that moment there was no wastewater treatment system in the city of Managua. The 2005 Census reported that 63% of households have toilet systems which discharge into sewers in Managua, with 30% of the population using pit latrines in settlements, and the remainder using septic tanks managed by five private companies.

In 1996 a Sanitation Master Plan for the City of Managua was completed and later finalized in 2002. Based on this study, ENACAL is currently overseeing the construction of a water treatment plant and collection system, funded by the Inter-American Development Bank (IDB), the German Kreditanstalt fuer Wiederaufbau (KfW), and the Nordic Fund, which was completed by December, 2008. This new plant treats 67% of the sewage waters in Managua.

== Water sources and uses ==
Nicaragua is a water-rich country with a water availability of 35,000 cubic meter/capita/year, corresponding to more than five times the average for Central America and the Caribbean. Less than 1% of these water resources is withdrawn for human use. The major water user is agriculture (84% of withdrawals), followed by domestic use (14%) and industry (2%).

Rainfall, while abundant, varies greatly. The Caribbean lowlands are the wettest section of Central America, receiving between 2,500 and 6,500 millimeters of rain annually. The western slopes of the central highlands and the Pacific lowlands receive considerably less annual rainfall. Mean annual precipitation for the rift valley and western slopes of the highlands ranges from 1,000 to 1,500 millimeters. Rainfall is seasonal—May through October is the rainy season, and December through April is the driest period.

Groundwater is the main source for municipal water supply in Nicaragua. For example, Managua - which is located on the shores of the polluted Lake Managua - is supplied entirely by groundwater, including by groundwater that infiltrates from the craters of volcanoes - called "lagoons'" within the city. For example, Asososca lagoon, to the west, is Managua's most important source of drinking water.

== History and recent developments ==
Under the Somoza government until 1979 the larger urban water systems were operated by the private sector, while a Ministerial department was in charge of water systems in smaller towns. After the revolution a centralized public national water company, the Instituto Nicaragüense de Acueductos y Alcantarillados (INAA), was created.

=== The reforms of 1998 ===
After the electoral defeat of Daniel Ortega's first administration (1979–1990) the subsequent governments tried to decentralize service provision without much success. In 1998, under the administration of Arnoldo Alemán (1997–2002), the sector was reformed, but not decentralized. The reform consisted in the separation of policy, regulatory and service provision functions: CONAPAS was created to set policies; ENACAL was created to provide services, taking over most of the staff and assets of INAA; and a new regulatory agency was created that inherited the name INAA.

Neither before the 1998 reform nor afterwards was there much change in the sector towards decentralization or the establishment of public-private partnerships. The financial self-sufficiency of ENACAL improved between 1998 and 2001, but there were public protests against the hardship imposed by higher tariffs. Subsequently, tariffs were frozen during the administration of Enrique Bolaños (2002–2007), leading to a gradual deterioration of the utility's financial situation.

=== Service contract ===
In 1999, ENACAL, with financial support from the IDB, accepted an international management contract with the goal of restructuring the sector to include private sector participation and transforming ENACAL into a publicly traded company. This project included provisions for decentralization, with private and local water management in the municipalities of León and Chinandega. Protests against privatization put a halt to these reforms and in 2003 the Nicaraguan Legislature passed Law 440 which included a moratorium on any water privatization. Soon after, the Nicaraguan Legislature also changed ENACAL's status from a “state-owned business” to a “state-owned public utility”.

=== Current administration ===
The current administration of Daniel Ortega took office in November 2006. This administration does oppose private sector participation and has been critical of autonomous regulation. One option considered by the government is to establish a National Water Authority.

The current administration has supported a restructuring of the 1999 IDB project. In December 2006 ENACAL signed a five-year service contract which eliminates all private sector development, including the private contracts for the sector in Léon and Chinandega, and gives ENACAL an exclusive service contract for commercial services (meter reading, billing, customer service), supported by the IDB as part of the modernization of ENACAL. The contract has been criticized by a consumer advocacy group which argues the agreement will make access to public water more costly to most Nicaraguans.

=== Sector strategy ===
In October 2005 CONAPAS approved a sector strategy that aims - again - at decentralization, financial self-sufficiency and strengthening of the regulator. In addition, it calls for the development of a sustainable operational model for rural areas.

In January 2007 CONAPAS launched a 10-year comprehensive water and sanitation plan. It foresees investments of US$592m and will focus on rural areas using the Social Fund FISE as an implementing agency.

A new Water Law was passed in November 2007 which gives ENACAL responsibility for supervision and control of service provision in rural areas. Although the law's implication for institutional responsibilities is not yet clear, a strategy for the entire sector is under preparation by ENACAL—rather than CONAPAS—and should shed some light on the institutional roles in the sector.

== Responsibility for water supply and sanitation ==
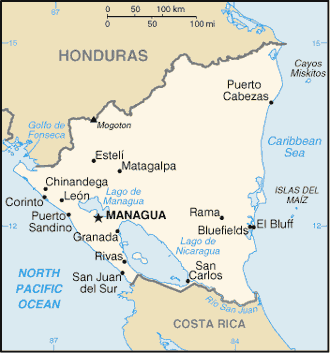
A map of Nicaragua.

The responsibilities in the water and sanitation sector in Nicaragua are defined in

- the General Drinking Water and Sewerage Services Law, Law No. 297 of 1998
- the Law-Decree No. 276 of 1998 that created ENACAL, and
- Law No. 275 of 1998 that transformed INAA into a regulatory agency.

A General Water Law (Ley General de Aguas Nacionales), which is focused on water resources but also covers a number of water supply and sanitation issues as well, was approved by Parliament on September 9, 2007.

=== Policy and regulation ===
Responsibility for policy setting in the Nicaraguan water and sanitation sector is vested in the National Council for Drinking Water and Sanitation - Comisión Nacional de Agua Potable y Alcantarillado Sanitario (CONAPAS). CONAPAS includes the Secretariat of the Presidency, whose representative presides the Council, the Ministry of Health, the Ministry of Environment, the national utility ENACAL, the regulatory agency INAA, the Institute for Territorial Studies (INETER) and the Social Investment Fund FISE.

The regulatory agency, the National Water and Sewerage Institute - Instituto Nicaragüense de Acueductos y Alcantarillados, INAA - is in charge of sector regulation. It handles customer complaints, approves tariff increases and can provide concessions for service providers. However, there were no tariff increase requests between August 2002 and February 2008 and no requests for concessions, so that the regulator has been condemned to inactivity.

=== Service provision ===
According to municipal law, municipalities are responsible for providing water and sanitation services in Nicaragua. However, in practice very few municipalities actually provide these services. Instead more than 60% of water users are served by the national water and sewerage company Empresa Nicaragüense de Acueductos y Alcantarillados (ENACAL), which serves most urban areas. A further 30% are served by community organizations (potable water committees) in rural areas. Less than 10% of users are served by a departmental water company in Rio Blanco as well as by 26 small municipalities.

As of 2004 ENACAL had a total of 410,000 registered users in the country, of which Managua represents 50 percent. ENACAL has 18 regional departments. Some of these departments have received greater autonomy, such as in the case of Granada, under what is called the "Modelo de Gestion Descontentrado".

=== Other functions ===
The Social Investment Fund FISE finances infrastructure and supports local communities in the management of infrastructure. In the water and sanitation sector it has been particularly active in rural water supply and sanitation.

Besides providing services in urban areas ENACAL also supported community organizations in rural areas and has been quite successful in this field. Both the WHO and the US-financed Environmental Health Project report high levels of sustainability of rural water service provision in projects supported by ENACAL's rural water directorate. However, in 2005, the responsibility for support to rural communities was given to FISE and donor funds are now channeled through it.

== Economic efficiency ==
The efficiency of urban service provision is low, with estimated non-revenue water of more than 55% in Managua. ENACAL has taken recent steps to improve efficiency, however and labor productivity has increased from 7.5 employees per 1000 water connections in 2006 to 7.04 in 2007. In 2007 operating and administrative costs decreased by 10%. ENACAL has accomplished these improvements by cutting back on energy usage, increasing billed revenue to 11.6% as of April 2008 through improving their commercial database, expanding metering, and identifying customers who were not previously billed.

Despite these improvements, ENACAL currently has a debt of 436 million córdobas (US$24 million) which is continuously growing as their expenses exceed their earnings by C$31.8 million (US$1.7 million) per month.

== Financial aspects ==
=== Tariffs and cost recovery ===
Only 59% of operating costs of ENACAL were recovered through tariff revenues as of 2012. There are many illegal connections that are not billed and many billed customers do not pay their water bills. For the utility, electricity costs for pumping are a major cost item. The government subsidizes operating costs at the tune of about 35 million Euro per year, out of operating costs equivalent to 85 million Euro (2.57 billion Cordoba).

Urban water and sewer tariffs charged by ENACAL have last been increased in 2008. There used to be substantial increases between 1998 and 2001, with annual increases of 28, 27 and 12% in 1998, 1999 and 2000 respectively. Such high and sustained increases were unusual in the region. While these increases allowed the public utility to regain its financial health, in 2001 they led to protests and legal action against a proposed further 30% tariff increase.

Afterwards tariffs have been frozen, eroding again the financial health of the utility. This led to its near bankruptcy and required the National Government to make transfers of an average of US$20 million per year to compensate net losses as of 2005. In February 2008 a water tariff increase was approved to cover the rise in inflation between 2002 and 2006. This increase is to be applied gradually beginning in May 2008, with an average increase of about 16%. Future increases will be approved by INAA.

ENACAL tariffs are complex and ostensibly aim at protecting the poor. Tariffs vary depending on the city (although prices are lower in Managua than in the rest of the country most likely because the cost of delivery is also lower), user category (three residential user categories and "institutions", the latter paying the highest tariffs; within the residential user categories the ratio between lowest and highest tariffs is 1:3) and consumption (higher tariffs for consumption above 20, 30 and 50 cubic meters per month respectively). The poorest who have no access to water and sewerage or are served by rural water committees are by definition excluded from these subsidies.

It has been estimated that an average household in the two lowest income quintiles in the interior of the country that receives water services from ENACAL paid the equivalent of US$6.50 per month in 2003, which corresponds to about 7% of its income estimated at US$93 per month. While this share is very high, the bill is probably lower than the economic cost of time spent carrying the water and the burden of disease from unsafe water.

In July 2007 there was a modification in sewerage tariffs for the City of Managua which allows sewage treatment costs to be partially covered. This change will be applied as soon as the sewage treatment plant becomes operational, which is expected to occur by the end of 2008.

=== Investment and financing ===
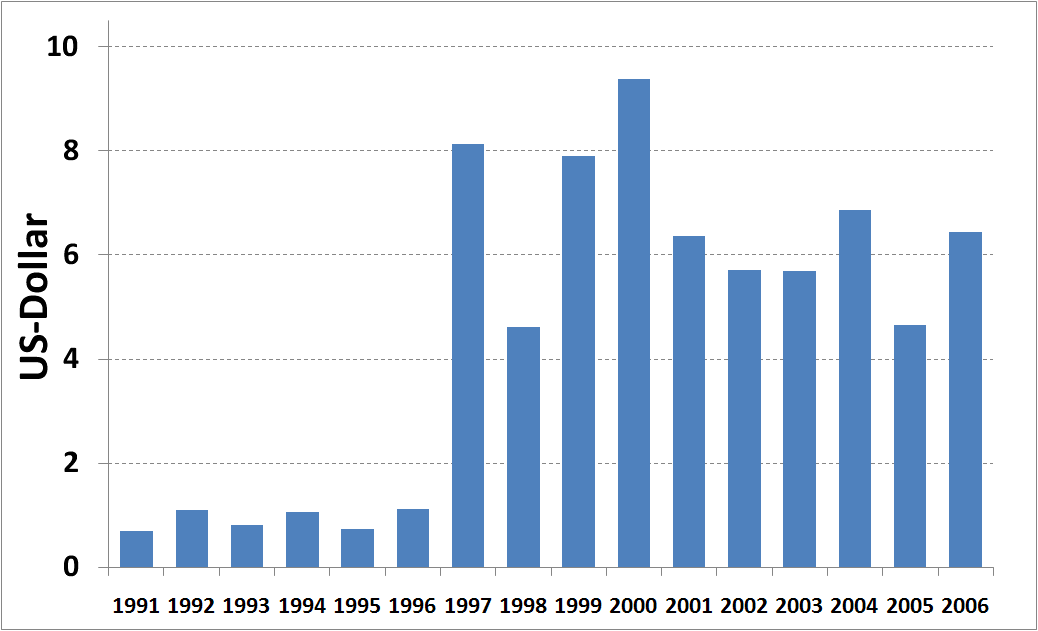
Nicaraguan investment per capita in water supply and sanitation from 1991 to 2006 in constant US Dollars of 2006.

The government plans to invest US$2 billion in the water and sanitation sector between 2013 and 2030 as part of its program VIDA - Programa Integral Sectorial de Agua y Saneamiento Humano de Nicaragua, which was elaborated as a draft in 2012. The first phase includes about US$350 million for 2013 to 2017, or about US$70 million per year. This would constitute a significant increase compared to previous years.

According to the Nicaraguan Unidad Pública de Inversiones or Public Investment Unit, investments in water and sanitation from 1991 to 2006 were US$351 million or on average US$22 million per year. This corresponds to 0.49% of GDP or US$4.5/capita/year. Within that period investment levels increased substantially in 1997. After ranging between US$0.7 and US$1.1 per capita from 1991 to 1996, it went up to US$4.7 to US$9.4 from 1997 to 2006. All in all, the average investment level per capita and year from 1997 to 2003 is higher than in its neighboring countries Costa Rica and Honduras, but lower than in South American countries like Argentina, Peru and Colombia.

Investments are almost entirely financed by foreign donors and the government passes foreign credits on as grants to ENACAL and to water committees in rural areas. Between 2002 and 2007 ENACAL invested US$162 million in the sector, of which 2% was self-financed by the utility, 5% was financed by the national government with its own resources, and the remaining 93% came from external grants and loans.

There are no data on investments by NGOs, which provide funds mainly for infrastructure in rural areas.

ICO has approved a $5 million loan to support the building of a sanitary sewerage and wastewater treatment system in Telica, Nicaragua. The initiative is funded by an agreement between ICO and the Central American Bank for Economic Integration (CABEI), which also funds other comparable projects in Central America.

The newly built network will be 17 kilometers long, treat 830 m3 of water each day, and serve around 11 000 people. It will save an estimated half-tonne of microplastics from entering the water each year.

== External support ==
The main donors in the water and sanitation sector in Nicaragua are the Spanish development cooperation (AECID) which supports the sector program VIDA, the Inter-American Development Bank (IDB) that implements the Spanish Water Fund FECASALC, the World Bank with its program to reduce water losses in Managua (PRASMA), a rural program called PRASNICA, a project for adaptation to climate change, Germany through GIZ and KfW, as well as the Swiss Development Cooperation (COSUDE) in rural areas. The United Nations Children's Fund (UNICEF), the Canadian International Development Agency (CIDA), the Nordic Fund, the Japan International Cooperation Agency and other donors also support the sector.

Numerous NGOs are engaged in the water and sanitation sector in Nicaragua, including CARE, Save the Children, Plan International, Health without Limits, Water for Life, Living Water International, blueEnergy, Christian Medical Action and Engineers Without Borders.

=== Donor coordination ===
The various donors that support the Nicaraguan government in its efforts to improve water supply and sanitation coordinate in a sector table and have subscribed in 2005 to a Sector-Wide Approach (SwAp) to even better coordinate their efforts. However, the sector table is not very active and the VIDA program of Spain and the IDB is now a main vehicle for the dialogue with the government on sector policies.

=== Interamerican Development Bank ===
The IDB supports many projects in the sector, in both urban and rural areas:

- The Municipal Social Investment Program is a US$50 million multi-sector project approved in 2005 and implemented by FISE. KfW provides an additional US$10 million and the OPEC International Fund US$4 million of co-financing for the project.
- The Potable Water and Sanitation Investment Program is a US$30.6 million project, with a potential for co-financing from SECO/Swiss for US$9 million, and was approved in 2006. The project supports Loan 1049/SF and aims to improve the technical, operational, commercial and financial management of ENACAL.The project is expected to be completed in 2011.
- The Modernization of the Management of Water and Sewerage Services Program was originally approved in 1999 to support reforms in the sector surrounding privatization and a service contract was given to an international operator contractor. The US$13.9 million project, with a co-financing of US$5 million from OPEC, has been restructured as of 2006 and ENACAL is now the sole contractor. The project is expected to be completed in 2010.
- The Institutional Support to the Coordination and Strategy Secretariat includes a US$1.38 million pre-investment study with ENACAL to design studies for potable water and sanitation projects within Managua. The studies are expected to be completed by the end of 2008.
- The Implementation Sanitation Measures Managua Lake and the Lake and City of Managua Environment Improvement projects bring together co-financing from the IDB (US$30 million), KfW (US$28 million), and the Nordic Fund (US$10 million), with the Government of Nicaragua contributing US$10 million, for a waste water treatment plant in the City of Managua. The project is expected to be completed by December 2008.

=== World Bank ===
- The Nicaragua Rural Water Supply and Sanitation Project is a combination credit (US$0.3 million) and grant (US$19.7 million) which was approved in June, 2008. The project, which will be implemented by FISE, aims to increase access to sustainable water supply and sanitation services in the rural areas of the country.

== See also ==
- Healthcare in Nicaragua
- Water resources management in Nicaragua

== Bibliography ==
- Interamerican Development Bank: Nicaragua. Water supply and sanitation investment program. Loan proposal, 2006 IDB 2006
- World Health Organization, 2000. Evaluación de los Servicios de Agua y Saneamiento 2000 en las Américas. WHO 2000
