= BlueEnergy =

Sustainable energy organization in Nicaragua

blueEnergy is a non-profit organization building sustainable energy and water systems on the Caribbean coast of Nicaragua. The organization began in October 2002 with an award-winning class project by co-founder Mathias Craig while he was a graduate student at MIT. The organization's main administrative office is located in San Francisco, while project work is centered on their shop in Bluefields, run by Guillaume Craig. Michèle Grégoire runs their office in Paris.

== Overview ==
blueEnergy's early projects involved in the installation of wind turbines in remote communities, building eight small power stations in remote Rama and Miskito villages. Since 2009, blueEnergy has switched to solar panels for power generation and broadened its activities to include water filtration and sanitation services, which are often more urgently needed than energy in the communities it serves. The organization drills wells, manufactures biosand filters, constructs latrines, and teaches safe sanitation practices, often with the beneficiaries themselves providing labor. blueEnergy's Global Leadership Program provides training and first-hand experience to prospective social entrepreneurs.

Mathias Craig and blueEnergy have been honored with several awards including the 2007 economic development Tech Award and 2007 CNN Heroes finalist. In 2008, he was elected an Ashoka fellow, and in 2012 was awarded a Fulbright NEXUS scholarship.

Though based in Bluefields, blueEnergy also does work across the South Caribbean Coast Autonomous Region.
