= Paul Oquist =

Nicaraguan politician (died 2021)

Paul Herbert Oquist Kelley (1942/43 – 13 April 2021) was a Nicaraguan politician, Secretary of the Presidency and considered the principal advisor to President Daniel Ortega.

== Biography ==
He was born in Oak Park, Illinois, U.S. and began working with Daniel Ortega in president's first term in the 1980s.

Oquist was the climate envoy for Nicaragua during the COP21 conference, and opposed Nicaragua joining the Paris Agreement. He cited his opposition to nationally determined contributions being voluntary.

On 9 October 2020, the U.S Department of the Treasury sanctioned Oquist and other Sandinists officials, stating that "[he] plays a lead role in spreading disinformation to cover up the regime’s crimes and misdeeds of horrific human rights abuses". Oquist was one of Ortega's main operators before different international forums, where he claimed that the opposition protests calling for the president's ouster in 2018 were an attempted coup d'état.

It is said that during the COVID-19 pandemic in Nicaragua, Oquist was the one who devised the president's decision not to decree a national lockdown as he considered the COVID-19 pandemic an invention of capitalist countries to solve internal problems, this according to Dora María Téllez.

Oquist died on 13 April 2021, at the Alejando Dávila Bolaño military hospital in Managua from COVID-19. He was 78.
