= Coffee production in Nicaragua =

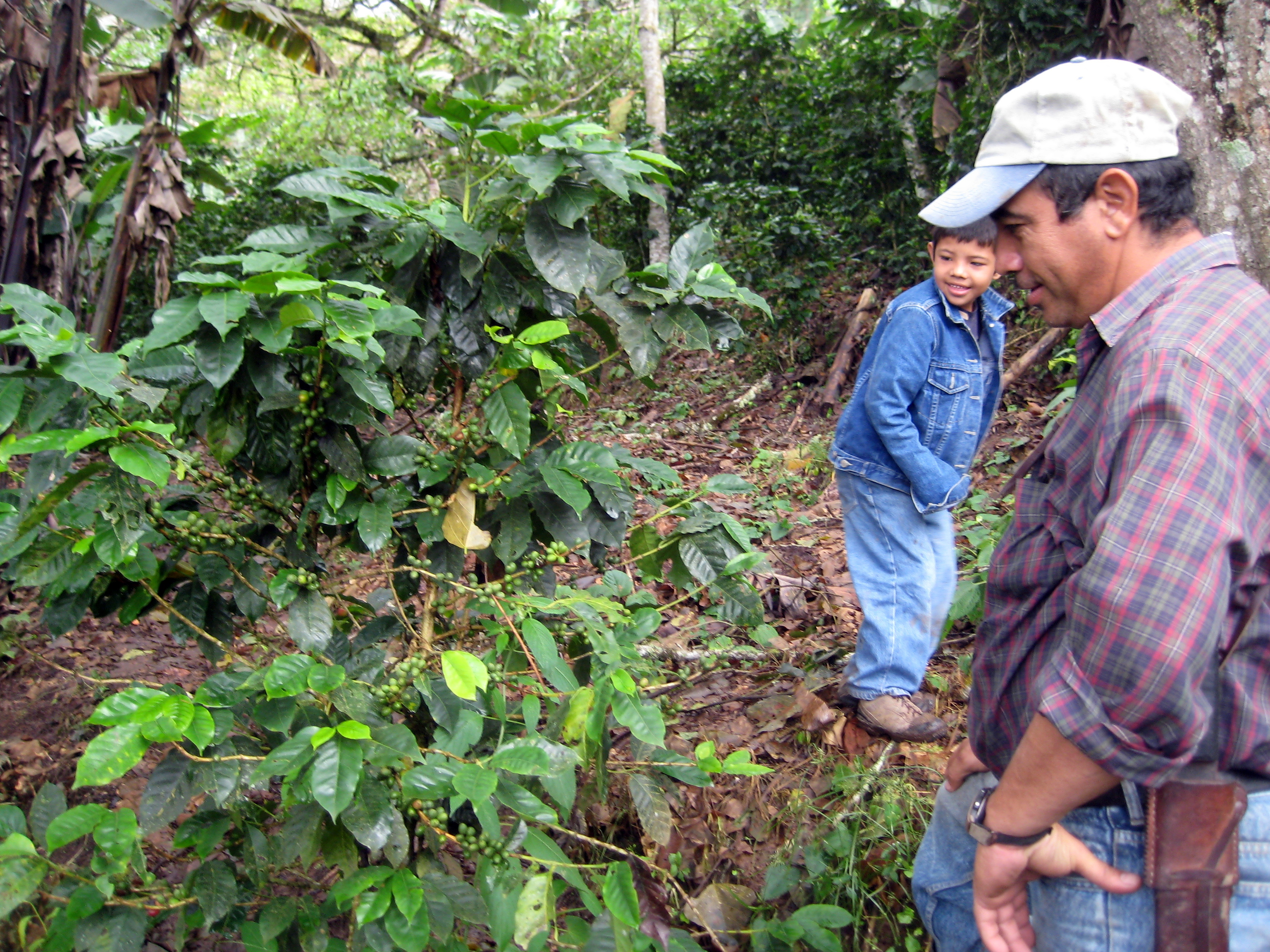
Coffee farm in the highlands of Quilalí.

Coffee production in Nicaragua has been an important part of its history and economy. It is one of the country's principal products. The areas most suitable for the cultivation of coffee have been Managua Department, Diriamba, San Marcos, Jinotepe, as well as the vicinity of Granada Department, Lake Nicaragua, Chontales Department, and in Nueva Segovia; historically, the best coffee is produced in Matagalpa and in Jinotega. Most of the coffee was grown in Managua Department, but Matagalpa Department produced the best bean quality. The most convenient altitude to grow coffee is 800 meters above the sea level.

== History ==
Large-scale coffee growing began in Nicaragua in the 1850s, and by 1870 coffee was the principal export crop, a position it held for the next century. Coffee is a demanding crop, however, because coffee trees require several years to produce a harvest, and the entire production process requires a greater commitment of capital, labor, and land than do many other crops. Coffee also grows only in the rich volcanic soil found on mountainous terrain, making transportation of the crop to the market difficult.

The crop of 1891 amounted to more than 5,000,000 kilograms (11 million pounds); 31,000 hectares (76,000 acres) of land were used, corresponding to a yield of 1,235 kilograms per hectare (1,102 lb/acre). The principal means of transporting coffee for exportation were the National Railroad from Granada to Corinto, on the Pacific, and the steamships from Lake Nicaragua and the San Juan River to the Atlantic Ocean. The Government of Nicaragua encouraged the establishment of coffee plantations, and decreed to award a prize of 5 cents for each tree in plantations of more than 5,000 trees. The majority of the Nicaraguan coffee was exported to Europe, because the freight to the United States was more expensive, and because in Europe it sold at a higher price. The United States consul stated that the coffee crop of Nicaragua amounted in 1900 to 150,000 bags, versus 75,000 in the preceding year; the coffee export duties amounted to approximately $300,000. The exportation of coffee in 1900 through the ports of El Castillo, Bluefields, and San Juan del Norte was 1,464,351 kilograms, the value of which amounted to $295,348.

In 1992 more land was planted in coffee than in any other crop. The actual amount of land devoted to coffee varies somewhat from year to year, but averaged 2,100 km^{2} (520,000 acres) in the 1980s. Production is centered in the northern part of the central highlands north and east of Estelí, and also in the hilly volcanic region around Jinotepe. Although production of coffee dropped somewhat in the late 1980s, the 1989 crop was still 42,000 tonnes (46,000 short tons). Nicaragua's poor transportation system and ecological concerns over the amount of land devoted to growing crops on volcanic slopes in the Pacific region limit further expansion of coffee cultivation. These limitations have led growers to explore planting other crops in undeveloped areas of the country.

In 2019 researchers from CIRAD, using test plots in Nicaragua developed a new F1 hybrid coffee tree named Starmaya that is designed to be propagated by seed in seed gardens. Starmaya has rust resistance, very good cup quality potential at high altitudes, and high yield potential.

== See also ==
- Agriculture in Nicaragua
- List of countries by coffee production
