= Agriculture in Nicaragua =

Nicaragua produces coffee, cotton, bananas, sugar, and beef cattle.

== Production ==
In 2018, Nicaragua produced 7.2 million tons of sugarcane, being heavily dependent on this product. In addition to sugarcane, the country produced 395 thousand tons of maize, 365 thousand tons of rice, 300 thousand tons of palm oil, 252 thousand tons of banana, 209 thousand tons of cassava, 197 thousand tons of beans, 194 thousand tons of peanut, 141 thousand tons of coffee, 118 thousand tons of orange, in addition to smaller yields of other agricultural products such as pineapple, potato, sorghum, tomato etc.

== History ==
Nicaragua's relatively low population density and its wealth of land resources have both held the promise of solutions to poverty and been a major cause of it. The importance of one or two crops has meant that the country's entire economy has undergone boom-or-bust cycles determined primarily by worldwide prices for agricultural exports.

Coffee became the country's principal crop in the 1870s, a position it still held as of 1992 despite the growing importance of other crops. Cotton gained importance in the late 1940s, and in 1992 was the second biggest export earner. In the early 1900s, Nicaraguan governments were reluctant to give concessions to the large United States banana companies, and bananas have never been as important a crop for Nicaragua as they have been for Nicaragua's Central American neighbors; bananas are grown in the country, however, and were generally the third largest export earner in the post-World War II period. Beef and animal by-products, the most important agricultural export for the three centuries before the coffee boom of the late 1800s, were still important commodities in 1992.

From the end of World War II to the early 1960s, the growth and diversification of the agricultural sector drove the nation's economic expansion. From the early 1960s until the increased fighting in 1977 caused by the Sandinista revolution, agriculture remained a robust and significant part of the economy, although its growth slowed somewhat in comparison with the previous postwar decades. Statistics for the next fifteen years, however, show stagnation and then a drop in agricultural production.

The agricultural sector declined precipitously in the 1980s. Until the late 1970s, Nicaragua's agricultural export system generated 40 percent of the country's GDP, 60 percent of national employment, and 80 percent of foreign exchange earnings. Throughout the 1980s, the Contras destroyed or disrupted coffee harvests as well as other key income-generating crops. Private industry stopped investing in agriculture because of uncertain returns. Land was taken out of production of export crops to expand plantings of basic grain. Many coffee plants succumbed to disease.

In 1989, the fifth successive year of decline, farm production declined by roughly 7 percent in comparison with the previous year. Production of basic grains fell as a result of Hurricane Joan in 1988 and a drought in 1989. By 1990 agricultural exports had declined to less than half the level of 1978. The only bright spot was the production of nontraditional export crops such as sesame, tobacco, and African palm oil.

== Crops ==
=== Sugar ===
Historically, poor transportation limited production of sugarcane to roughly the same area in northwest Nicaragua where bananas were grown. Demand for sugar remained comparatively low until the United States-imposed embargo on Cuban sugar began in 1960. Demand then soared, and sugar production tripled over in the next two decades. Like all other agricultural products, sugar production was severely hit by the United States trade embargo on Nicaraguan products from 1985 to 1990. Production of raw sugarcane stood at 2,300 tons in 1989.

Sugar production increased dramatically, and Nicaragua produced 7.2 million tons of sugarcane in 2018, being heavily dependent on this product.

=== Rice ===
Nicaragua's domestic rice production is only able to satisfy 70% of the countries demand. Leading to rice having to be imported from other places.

Rice is primarily produced in the departments of Matagalpa, Granada, Boaco, Chontales, Leon, Rivas and Rio San Juan. And an estimated 70% of this land has been irrigated. Reports from the Nicaraguan Association of Rice Growers (ANAR), national production of irrigated rice is about 65.6 quintals per manzana, while it is around 26 quintals per manzana for rainfed rice.

=== Palm oil ===
The first palm oil plantations began production in 1990, these were created in the Caribbean lowlands.

=== Bananas ===
Unlike in other Central American countries, political squabbles over who would control the plantations and shipment of the crop prevented bananas from becoming the major export earner in Nicaragua. Bananas, a native fruit of tropical Asia, were introduced to Nicaragua early in the colonial period. Initially, until a market for them appeared in the United States in the 1860s, bananas, like other fruit, were destined mostly for local consumption.

Small plots of the Gros Michel variety of banana were planted for export, but political turmoil and difficulties in establishing secure transportation routes hampered export. Because United States companies developed banana production in neighboring countries, Nicaragua's large potential for this crop remained underdeveloped.

Politics and outbreaks of disease in the 20th century kept banana production low. During their time in power, the Somoza family, who had discovered that coffee and cattle were more profitable than bananas, refused to give United States banana companies the free rein that they enjoyed throughout the rest of Central America. In addition, an outbreak of Panama disease, a fungus that kills the plant's underground stem, wiped out most of the banana plantations in the early 20th century.

New plants of the Valery and Giant Cavendish variety were planted, with constant use of fungicides was required to control black sigatoka disease. Although Cavendish bananas yield three times the harvest of the older Gros Michel type, Cavendish bananas are more difficult to harvest and transport. Cavendish bananas, for example, bruise easily and must be picked at an earlier stage and crated in the fields for transport. Most banana production is in the Pacific lowlands, in a region extending north from Lago de Managua to the Golfo de Fonseca. In 1989, banana production amounted to 132,000 tons.

=== Coffee ===
Large-scale coffee growing began in Nicaragua in the 1850s, and by 1870 coffee was the principal export crop, a position it held for the next century. Coffee is a demanding crop, however, because coffee trees require several years to produce a harvest, and the entire production process requires a greater commitment of capital, labor, and land than do many other crops. Coffee also grows only in the rich volcanic soil found on mountainous terrain, making transportation of the crop to the market difficult.

In 1992 more land was planted in coffee than in any other crop. The actual amount of land devoted to coffee varies somewhat from year to year, but averaged 2,100 km^{2} in the 1980s. Production is centered in the northern part of the central highlands north and east of Estelí, and also in the hilly volcanic region around Jinotepe.

Although production of coffee dropped somewhat in the late 1980s, the 1989 crop was still 42,000 tons. Nicaragua's poor transportation system and ecological concerns over the amount of land devoted to growing crops on volcanic slopes in the Pacific region limit further expansion of coffee cultivation. These limitations have led growers to explore planting other crops in undeveloped areas of the country.

=== Cotton ===
Cotton was Nicaragua's second biggest export earner as of the 1980s. A latecomer to Nicaraguan agriculture, cotton became feasible as an export crop only in the 1950s, when pesticides were developed that permitted high yields in tropical climates. Cotton soon became the crop of choice for large landowners along the central Pacific coast.

As the amount of land under cultivation grew, erosion and pollution from the heavy use of pesticides became serious problems. Lack of credit for planting, a drop in world cotton prices, and competition from Chile discouraged cotton production in the mid-1980s. Production of cotton dropped significantly in the 1980s, and the 1989 crop of 22,000 tons was less than a third of that produced in 1985.

== Livestock ==
The first cattle were brought to Nicaragua by the Spanish in the 16th century, and livestock raising was a mainstay of the early colony. Drier areas on the western slopes of the central highlands were ideal for cattle raising, and by the mid-18th century, a wealthy elite, whose income was based on livestock raising, controlled León, Nicaragua's colonial capital.

In the late 20th century, as was true in the late 16th century, cattle raising has been concentrated in the areas east of Lago de Managua. Most beef animals are improved zebu strains. Smaller herds of dairy cattle- -mostly Jersey, Guernsey, or Holstein breeds—are found near population centers. A breed that is unique to Nicaragua is the La Reina.

== Agricultural policy ==
In 1979 the new Sandinista administration quickly identified food as a national priority in order that the country's chronically malnourished rural population could be fed. The government planned to increase production to attain self-sufficiency in grains by 1990. Self-sufficiency in other dietary necessities was planned for the year 2000. For a variety of reasons, however, including the private sector's retention of 60 percent of arable land, the Sandinista government continued to import food and grow cash crops. In 1993 the goal of self-sufficiency in food production was still far from being achieved.

To generate essential foreign exchange, the Ortega administration continued to support an upscale, high-tech agroexport sector, but returns on its investment diminished. By 1990 only one-quarter of the pre-1979 area planted in cotton, one of the leading foreign exchange earners in the 1970s, was still under cultivation. Despite an established priority for food production, food imports to Nicaragua grew enormously from the mid-1970s to the mid-1980s.

In general, the Sandinistas made little progress in reducing economic dependence on traditional export crops. To the contrary, faced with the need for food self-sufficiency versus the need for essential foreign exchange earnings, the Ortega administration, demonstrating scant economic expertise, continued to prop up the country's traditional agroindustrial export system. They did so despite expensive foreign imports, diminished export markets, and a powerful opposing private sector.

Revenues from traditional export crops continued their rapid decline throughout the 1980s. Despite this drop, agriculture accounted for 29 percent of the GDP in 1989 and an estimated 24 percent in 1991. Agriculture employed about 45% of the work force in 1991.

== Works cited ==
- Merrill, Tim, ed. (1994). Nicaragua: a country study (3rd ed.). Washington, D.C.: Federal Research Division, Library of Congress. ISBN 0-8444-0831-X. OCLC 30623751.
