= Timeline of the 2018 Nicaraguan protests =

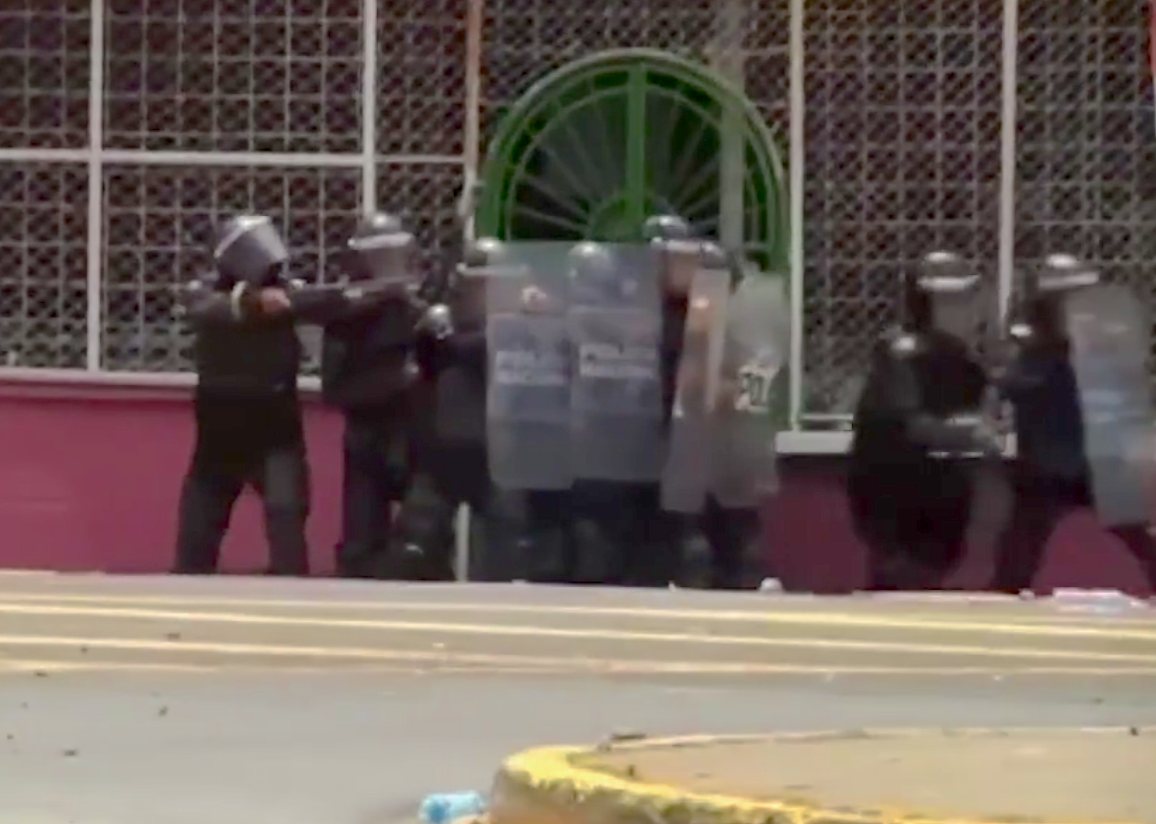
Police responding to protests

The 2018 Nicaraguan protests began on 18 April 2018 following a move by the government of Daniel Ortega to reform social security. Following the deaths of protesters, demonstrations intensified and grew into a large anti-Ortega movement seeking his removal from office.

== Timeline by months ==
=== April ===
April 3–12, 2018 — Indio Maíz Reserve Fire

• April 3rd, A massive fire breaks out in the Indio Maíz Biological Reserve, one of Nicaragua’s most important protected areas. • The government’s slow and inadequate response to the environmental disaster sparks frustration. • On April 6th, Facebook pages posted a public appeal regarding the wildfires in Nicaragua’s Indio Maíz Biological Reserve, calling for international assistance due to the Nicaraguan government’s failure to act. • Environmental groups and university students begin organizing protests and social media campaigns using hashtags like #SOSIndioMaíz. • On April 10, influential social media figures urged the people to peacefully protest against the government. These protests are peaceful but quickly met with police repression and censorship. • Between April 5th and 12th, as well as in the following weeks of April, social media figures published alerts and critiques to raise public awareness, highlight the severity of the wildfires, and hold the Nicaraguan regime accountable for its failure to contain the disaster. Several posts were shared by thousands of followers, reaching a wider audience throughout the country. April 10–13, 2018 — Student-Led Protests Begin • Students hold protests in Managua and other cities demanding immediate government action on the fire. • On April, 10th, social media called for a protest at the University of Central America at 5:30 PM. • Mobilized by social media posts, students and sympathizers organized peaceful protests from April 10th to 13th. Students faced violent repression by military and police forces. One student was reported killed inside the UCA. • April 10th marks the first day of protests, in the Centro American University. (Universidad Centro Americana). The first protests lasted all night. On April 11th, the protest became a march along the main streets of several cities. In Managua, protesters were violently met by the police in the Plaza las Victorias. • The government blocks journalists and attacks student protestors, intensifying public outrage. • This marks the first wave of resistance, centered around environmental and freedom of expression concerns.

April 14-17, 2018 – Intensification of protests, increased violence

• Violent crackdowns began: Government-aligned groups (grupos de choque) and police used live ammunition, rubber bullets, and tear gas against demonstrators. • First deaths reported: At least 2 protesters were killed in Managua and León. • Barricades erected: Students and activists blocked roads in Managua to protest repression. • Pro-government mobs attacked protesters: Armed civilians (suspected of being Sandinista sympathizers) assaulted demonstrators, journalists, and clergy. • Catholic Church mediation: Bishops offered to facilitate dialogue between protesters and the Ortega government. • Death toll rose: Reports indicated over 10–20 killed since protests began on April 10. • International condemnation: The OAS and human rights groups denounced state violence.

April 17, 2018 — Social Security Reform Announced

• The government of President Daniel Ortega announces reforms to the social security system (INSS): Increases in worker and employer contributions. A 5% deduction from retiree pensions. • The move is widely viewed as unfair and harmful to vulnerable populations.

Sources: ReVista – Harvard Review of Latin America : https://revista.drclas.harvard.edu/my-experience-in-the-2018-nicaraguan-student-movement-paying-the-price-of-our-troubled-past/ Organization of American States . https://www.oas.org/es/cidh/decisiones/pdf/2018/91-18mc1060-18-ni.docx Human Rights Watch. https://www.hrw.org/report/2019/06/19/crackdown-nicaragua/torture-ill-treatment-and-prosecutions-protesters-and Confidencial news: https://confidencial.digital/english/timeline-nicaragua-eight-months-of-civic-rebellion/

== Timeline by months ==
=== April ===
- 18 April – Citizens already angered by the handling of the Indio Maiz fires expanded their protests in response to the Ortega administration's announcement of social security reforms that raised income and payroll taxes while reducing pension benefits by 5%. Demonstrations involving mostly elderly individuals, university students, and other activists broke out in Managua and six other cities, which were met with a heavy response from the authorities ordered by President Ortega. Authorities were seen using live ammunition on protesters while also arming Sandinista Youth mobs with weapons. Various forms of independent media were censored during the protests.

Anti-riot police outside the National University of Engineering loading ammunition in Managua, 19 April 2018.

- 19 April – Vice President and first lady Rosario Murillo made a speech mocking the demonstrators and labeling them as "small groups, small souls, toxic, full of hate", bent on the destruction of the country. She also labeled the demonstrators that had been attacked as "aggressors" and the attack by pro-Ortega groups and police as "legitimate defense".

There were major protests and confrontations in León, Managua, Granada, Boaco, Carazo, Estelí, Rivas, Matagalpa and Masaya. TELCOR ordered the suspension of transmissions of four independent TV channels that were reporting the news: channels 12, 23, 51, and 100% Noticias. Also the Roman Catholic Episcopal Conference's TV channel. The suspension lasted several hours, except for 100% Noticias, who was out of the air until 25 April. Murillo accused the protesters of being manipulated and trying to "destabilize" and "destroy" Nicaragua.

- 20 April - The 15-year-old student of Instituto Loyola, Álvaro Conrado, was shot to death during a demonstration. He died when the hospital refused to let him enter.
- 21 April – Ortega makes his first public appearance and announced he would hold negotiations for possible revision of the reforms, planned to take effect on 1 July; however, he said he would only meet with business leaders and alleged that demonstrators were being manipulated by gangs and other political interests. Demonstrations increased in response, with protestors objecting to the repression of demonstrations and the exclusion of other sectors from the negotiations, as well as the reforms themselves. The business chamber COSEP announced it would only participate in the negotiation if police violence ceased, detained protestors were released and free speech was restored. Nicaragua's Roman Catholic Conference of Bishops (CEN) also called for an end to the police violence and criticized unilateral reforms; Pope Francis subsequently added his call for peace in the country.
- 22 April – As press described the unrest as the biggest crisis of Ortega's presidency, Ortega announced the cancellation of the social security reforms, acknowledging they were not viable and had created a "dramatic situation". He again proposed negotiations on the issue, this time to include Catholic Cardinal Leopoldo Brenes as well as the business community.
- 23 April – Marches of citizens, businessmen and students were held in Managua demanding the end of violence in the country, the release of students arrested by the police, the cessation of censorship of television media, and a response from the government about the students who died during the protests. The protests were the largest seen during the Ortega administration, with tens to hundreds of thousands of demonstrators participating and calling for the president's resignation.
- 24 April – Over 200 detainees got released by Nicaraguan authorities. This was the result of dialogue between the government and other organizations. Leaders of the campesino (peasant) movement released a statement in support of youth and self-organized grassroots protestors and called for a national strike until negotiations included all sectors of society. Peasant rights leader Francisca Ramírez called for Ortega's resignation.
- 26 April – Nicaraguan Attorney General Inés Miranda announced a formal investigation into the deaths during the protests.
- 27 April – President of the National Assembly Gustavo Porras announced a truth commission to examine the deaths and violence during the unrest. Head of the National Police Aminta Granera announced her resignation in face of the criticism of her handling of the unrest and alleged police repression of protests.
- 28 April – Hundreds of thousands participated in marches for "peace and justice" organized by the Catholic churches in Nicaragua in the cities of Managua, Matagalpa and León, León. At the events, "bishops, feminists, homosexuals, family members of those killed in the repression... and thousands of peasants" gathered in unity to demonstrate. Peasants who lived in rural areas traveled to Managua by a caravan of trucks, arriving to protest against the Nicaragua Canal proposal by Chinese businessmen and the Ortega government.
- 29 April – Anonymous attacked the websites belonging to the Government of Nicaragua.
- 30 April – Tens of thousands of Ortega's supporters participated in a rally showing him support. The rally consisted mostly of singing and dancing to music popular to the former Sandinista guerrillas. There were some reports of government workers being forced to join the pro-Ortega rally.

=== May ===
- 1 May – The Government of Nicaragua rejected the Inter-American Human Rights Commission's request to investigate the violence surrounding the weeks of protest.
- 2 May – Student groups created a deadline for the Nicaraguan government to allow the Inter-American Human Rights Commission and the United Nations Human Rights Office to send in personnel to investigate the killings of protesters. Police in riot gear blocked a student march from Central American University (UCA) to the National Assembly, with students instead marching to the Polytechnic University of Nicaragua (UPOLI) to show solidarity with other groups entrenched there. After pro-Ortega groups appeared on their route, they cancelled another planned march, so students reinforced barricades surrounding UPOLI under the watch of authorities. Anonymous Nicaragua hacked the website of the National Police of Nicaragua, calling for them to support of anti-Ortega protesters.
- 3 May – Shock troops of the Nicaraguan armed forces and police assaulted UPOLI in the early morning at about 01:00 CT, dispersing students stationed at the university. The incident left six students injured, one seriously. Student group Movimiento 19 de Abril responded to the incident stating that they would not participate in a dialogue with Ortega after he sent forces to attack them, placing peace talks in jeopardy.
- 4 May – Paramilitary groups, reportedly supervised by Sandinista mayor of Masaya Orlando Noguera Vega, attacked protestors at the entrance to the Niquinohomo municipality, birthplace of Augusto César Sandino. The protesters were surrounding a statue of Sandino painted blue and white, the colors of the Nicaraguan flag, that had become a symbol of the protests.
- 6 May – The university groups Alianza Universitaria Nicaragüense, Movimiento Estudiantil 19 de Abril and Movimiento Universitario 19 de Abril created a coalition to participate in dialogue and condemned the pro-Ortega National Assembly's move to create a truth commission which they deemed to be biased.
- 8 May – Students of the National Agrarian University (UNA) and the Catholic University (Unica, private), added to the protests in Nicaragua, manifesting their discomfort in the streets, and more Nicaraguans joined the protests throughout the day.
- 9 May – Members of the independent press of Nicaragua condemned the massacre, censorship and repression of the Government of Nicaragua. The Apostolic Network of Nicaragua, which brings together some 1,500 evangelical churches throughout the country, called for the resignation of Ortega and Murillo, and joined the majority of the Nicaraguan people. Thousands of people marched through the streets under the slogan "For Justice and the Democratization of Nicaragua". In a new show of popular force, the third in three weeks, the crowd dressed in t-shirts and flags of Nicaragua. Meanwhile, in another sector of Managua, people sympathetic to the government met in Avenida Bolivar to give support to the ruler and his wife. It is reported that there were four police officers injured during the demonstrations.
- 10 May – Dozens of peasants carry out a sit-in at the intersection of Lóvago, in the jurisdiction of the municipality of San Pedro de Lóvago in the Chontales Department, demanding that the government of Nicaragua accelerate the installation of a dialogue involving all sectors. The march of the buses, trucks, and other vehicles, that covered the route from Managua to Nueva Guinea, from Managua to San Carlos, and vice versa, remained paralyzed in that place because of the traffic jams. The National Autonomous University of Nicaragua (UNAN-Managua) demanded the delivery of the Rubén Darío campus, where, since 7 May, a group of students had been entrenched in demand for the dismissal of the student leadership and expressing their support for the citizen protests. The Truth Commission indicated that it would contact the Inter-American Commission on Human Rights (CIDH), as part of the investigations of the April protests, which left at least 47 people dead. In a statement, the five members of the Truth Commission promised to clarify the numbers of dead, wounded, imprisoned, and disappeared and the destruction of infrastructure during the April protests. The Nicaraguan Catholic Bishops' Conference (CEN) would determine when dialogues would begin to address the crisis, the Nicaraguan government said. Murillo said that Ortega awaited the call of the bishops. An armed attack on students entrenched in a university in Managua left one dead and eleven injured, according to Víctor Cuadras, spokesperson for the Student Movement 19 April (M19A); the student died in the hospital where he had been carried after being shot during the attack.
- 11 May – The Government of Nicaragua, through its official website, El 19, recognized the death of three people during the clashes that occurred in the early hours in UPOLI in Managua, which would increase the death toll in the protests. Additional protests occurred nationwide against the Sandinista National Liberation Front and Ortega, in solidarity with the university students who died in the early hours of 11 May in UPOLI, Managua. The Nicaraguan Catholic Bishops' Conference (CEN) and the private sector of Nicaragua, main interlocutors of the next national dialogue with the government, rejected the attacks that occurred in the early morning. The First Lady and Vice President of Nicaragua Rosario Murillo indicated that the Government was prepared to attend the dialogue when the bishops deemed it convenient. The university students and the private sector of Nicaragua stated that they were also open to dialogue.
- 12 May – More than 10 cities were the scene of heavy fighting in at least eight departments in the north, center, and Pacific areas of Nicaragua. The biggest clashes took place in Chinandega, Granada, León, Managua, Masaya, and Rivas in the Pacific, as well as Estelí and Matagalpa in the north. In Masaya, the clashes lasted for more than 12 hours between demonstrators, anti-riot police and youth shock groups of the ruling Sandinista party.

The Nicaraguan Catholic Bishops' Conference (CEN) gave the government of Daniel Ortega 72 hours to provide conditions to start a dialogue amid the protests calling for the resignation of the president. The ultimatum of the bishops came after three people died on Friday in a new day of protests in the country. The four conditions that the president of Nicaragua must fulfill according to the bishops were:

1. Allow the entry of a delegation of the Inter-American Commission on Human Rights (CIDH).
2. Suppress paramilitary bodies and order the withdrawal of civilians in favor of the president.
3. Stop all kinds of police repression against protesting civil groups.
4. Willingness of dialogue on the part of the government.
- 13 May – President Ortega called for a cessation of violence, reading a short statement, in which he called for "an end to death and destruction, that does not continue to shed blood of Nicaraguan brothers". The Military of Nicaragua assured that it would not engage in acts of repression against citizens who were protesting and advocated a dialogue to help resolve the crisis in the country, according to statements made by spokesman Colonel Manuel Guevara. In a demonstration, thousands of people arrived on 13 May from Managua to Masaya in a caravan to support that city for the loss of at least one life and 150 wounded in the past days. The caravan left at 10:00 am from the Jean Paul Genie roundabout in Managua, where citizens gathered early to the sound of bubucelas and the fluttering of blue and white flags.
- 14 May – The Government of Nicaragua accepted the entry of a mission from the Inter-American Commission on Human Rights visit (IACHR) to "observe the human rights situation" in the country, according to the Secretary General of the Organization of American States (OAS) Luis Almagro. The student representatives, civil society, and private sector were invited to participate in the national dialogue by the Episcopal Conference of Nicaragua (CEN), confirmed their consent to go to the dialogue table that will start on Wednesday 16 May 2018 despite the repression of the National Police of Nicaragua and groups of Clashes of the FSLN. Strong disputes between riot police, together with members of the Sandinista Youth, and civilians protesting against the government in Sébaco, Matagalpa, left at least 16 injured, including four minors. The leader of the anti-Nicaraguan canal movement, Francisca Ramírez, announced that she had been excluded from the national dialogue as representative of the peasantry in Nicaragua.
- 15 May – Clashes continued in Matagalpa.

==== National Dialogue (16–23 May) ====
- 16 May – When Ortega and Murillo arrived at the Seminary of Our Lady of Fatima, site of the national dialogue, the presidential couple was greeted with shouts of "assassins, murderers" by people on the outskirts of the event. Guatemalan filmmaker Eduardo Jessi Espigar Szejmer died in the night when a metal tree sculpture fell on him. The sculpture was taken down during a demonstration that took place in the Metrocentro sector, Managua. There were protests in the capital.
- 17 May – A delegation from the Inter-American Commission on Human Rights (IACHR) arrived in Nicaragua to observe in loco the situation of human rights in the country. The IACHR visit occurred as Nicaraguan human rights organizations were reporting between 61 and 67 people dead and more than 500 injured in the repression exercised against protesters. The delegation was headed by Antonia Urrejola, rapporteur for Nicaragua at the IACHR.
- 18 May – On 18 May, the IACHR called on the State of Nicaragua to immediately cease the repression, said Commissioner Antonia Urrejola, rapporteur of the IACHR for Nicaragua, in a statement. The IACHR stated that they would meet with the victims of the repression. "We call on the State of Nicaragua to immediately cease the repression of the protest, the commission also calls on the State to guarantee the independence and functioning of the media in the country", the rapporteur also indicated that the mission of the IACHR in the country will be the observation in the field in accordance with human rights. She indicated that she would meet with all sectors. Mothers of young people who died in the protests filed a complaint with the IACHR. There were clashes, protests, and the entrance of "several armed hooded men" to the San José parish in Matiguás, Matagalpa, and closure of streets in Nueva Guinea, Jinotega, and other Nicaraguan departments. León, Carazo, Matagalpa and Jinotega were under strikes for lack of products, due to the crisis. The dialogue continued on the second day. There was friction between university students and members of the official press before the dialogue. The Inter-American Commission on Human Rights arrived at the national dialogue. The government and the Nicaraguan opposition agreed to a truce over the weekend, a month after having started demonstrations and protests. Several people appeared before the Inter-American Commission to lodge complaints against the violations carried out by the police forces and supporters of the Daniel Ortega government.
- 19 May – The university students announce that they would continue the marches and the protests in a peaceful way. On 19 May, there were marches in several cities of Nicaragua in commemoration of those killed in the protests that had affected the country for a month. On the night of 19 May 2018, there was an attack on students of the National Agrarian University (UNA) who protested near the university grounds – whose rector accused the National Police, who in turn denied it – and which left eight injured. Students who were entrenched in the UNA and residents of surrounding neighborhoods reported an attack by police and members of youth sandinistas on the campus, located near the Augusto C. Sandino International Airport. The Inter-American Commission on Human Rights received thousands of complaints from the population and was making inquiries in Matagalpa and other places where there was excessive repression against anti-government protests.
- 20 May – There were peaceful protests in several cities of Nicaragua, and the violation of the truce by the Nicaraguan Police was denounced. The attack perpetrated Saturday night against the students who remained entrenched in the National Agrarian University (UNA) left at least eight wounded, two of them seriously, as confirmed by students from that campus, who this Sunday collected evidence of the aggression that was documented by the Inter-American Commission on Human Rights (CIDH). The university students pointed to supporters of the government under the direction of police commanders as those responsible for the aggression; however, the institution, through an official note, reported that it had no presence in the area. Six injured were treated at the medical post of the campus in charge of the students and two other young people, wounded by bullet wounds, were transferred to a hospital. Nicaraguan demonstrators demolished more of the metal trees, called trees of life, that are symbols of the government of Ortega.
- 21 May – The national dialogue continued on its third day where the resignation of Ortega and his wife and the Nicaraguan government was requested, requesting the return to normality. The Inter-American Commission on Human Rights (IACHR), issued a preliminary report on the investigations of what happened in the protests in Nicaragua. The IACHR counted at least 76 people killed in the protests in Nicaragua and more than 800 injured, and denounced serious events and violations of human rights by the Government of Nicaragua. It included the official visit of the IACHR to Nicaragua. The representatives of the organization were in Managua, Masaya, León and Matagalpa.
- 23 May – The National Dialogue between the government of Nicaragua and students, the private sector and civil society that began a week ago was suspended indefinitely. The leader of the Nicaraguan Catholic Church, Bishop Leopoldo Brenes, who had acted as a mediator of this dialogue, explained that the lack of agreement on an agenda of issues to be discussed prevented negotiations from continuing.
- 30 May – On 30 May, the day on which the Nicaraguan mothers are celebrated, a march was held in honor of the victims killed during the protests. It was repressed by the national police in the company of paramilitary groups and government-like mobs, leaving approximately 15 dead. Most of the victims died from accurate shots to the head, neck and chest. The march was led by the Mothers of April Movement, the Student Movement 19 April, Civil Society and Private Enterprise.

=== June ===
- 1 June – In the early hours of 1 June, Masaya reported that there had been a new wave of looting and robberies against businesses and stores in the city. The UN urged the Nicaraguan government to allow them access to the country to gather information about the violence and deaths recorded during the protests and to be able to verify the reports of violations of rights, disappearances, torture and arbitrary detentions. The spokeswoman for the Office of the United Nations High Commissioner for Human Rights said at the UN biweekly press conference in Geneva that the agency is "dismayed" by the ongoing violence in Nicaragua, which this week has left at least 16 dead and more than a hundred injured. Movements, associations of professionals and Nicaraguan social groups called for a civic-citizen national strike and civil disobedience since 1 June, as a means of pressure for President Daniel Ortega and his wife, Vice President Rosario Murillo, to leave power. Five banks have closed in Masaya for lootings. The Inter-American Commission on Human Rights (IACHR) condemned the deaths and new acts of violence that occurred in Nicaragua and urged the state to stop the repression of the protests. The IACHR also urges the government to investigate and punish the use of force by parapolitical actors, dismantle these groups, and seek a peaceful, constitutional and democratic solution to the current political crisis affecting the country.
- 2 June – Heavy clashes between government forces and riot police against demonstrators and citizens of La Concepcion sector. It is indicated that there are two citizens killed and several people injured. Other clashes occurred in Masaya, Carazo, and Matagalpa. They reported attacks from paramilitary and anti-riot groups since dawn. The US Embassy in Managua confirmed the death of the US citizen who was found this morning in the Rubenia sector in Managua. "The United States Government expresses its condolences to the family of the deceased US citizen last night and to all the families who recently visited legal medicine. The death of a US citizen is of great concern to the embassy", Ambassador Laura Dogu wrote in her Twitter account. Resident citizens of the place indicate Sandinista youth shock groups as the culprits of the homicide. A group of children with their parents marched through the streets of Managua against repression and solidarity to university students who died in the protests.

=== July ===
- 8 July – At least 38 were killed during skirmishes between protesters, authorities and pro-Sandinista paramilitary groups. This left more than 300 Nicaraguans killed since the beginning of protests.

==== Attack on Bishops and nuncio in Diriamba ====
- 9 July – Mobs, some hooded and armed, surrounded and verbally and physically offended the bishops today, including Cardinal Leopoldo Brenes and the Vatican ambassador to Nicaragua Waldemar Sommertag, after arriving in Diriamba, Carazo. Men in plain clothes, hooded and some armed, first verbally offended the religious and then attacked them physically, wounding some of them, while the journalists robbed and beat.
- 10 July – Nicaraguan businessmen, the United States, international organizations and European governments condemned the fact and the Nicaraguan Catholic Bishops' Conference (CEN) suspended for indefinite time the working groups of the national dialogue. The Churches of Costa Rica and Panama, in separate messages, in addition to various dioceses of the country, manifested their solidarity with the bishops and their repudiation of violence. The Episcopal Conference of Costa Rica also urged the international community to collaborate with the solution to this conflict, to find the path that leads to peace Vice President of Nicaragua, Rosario Murillo, said that the government presiding over her husband, Daniel Ortega, is "indestructible" and that the opposition "could not" defeat him in the context of the sociopolitical crisis that this country is suffering and that has claimed at least 351 lives, according to humanitarian organizations and I justify the actions of violence against the Nicaraguan bishops and the apostolic Nuncio in Diriamba.
- 11 July – The Nicaraguan opposition and academic Félix Maradiaga was attacked in the city of León (northwest Nicaragua) by a group of Sandinista sympathizers of the government of President Daniel Ortega.
- 12 July – The Civic Alliance for Justice and Democracy and Opposition Demonostors begins unrest amid a government crackdown continues to affect various Nicaraguan towns and cities. Three days of demonstrations are set to take place from Thursday, 12 July 13 July through Saturday, 14 July. The March called "Together We are a Volcano" will be held in the capital Managua, where demonstrators will leave from the Rotonda Cristo Rey (roundabout; a.k.a. Rotonda Santo Domingo) at 10:00 (local time) and march to the Rotonda Jean Paul Genie, passing through the Autolote El Chele intersection and the Alexis Argüello monument. The march "Together we are a volcano" in Morrito, Rio San Juan, ended in clashes between armed protesters and the police of the place. Different sources in the place say that there are four policemen dead and a self-called. The National Police, in a statement, confirmed on the night of Thursday, 12 July 2018, about the five people killed among them. The head of the local police, commissioner Luis Bustos, is one of the deceased.
- 13 July – Nicaragua awoke under a 24-hour national strike, the second in less than a month, convened by the Civic Alliance for Justice and Democracy to demand from President Daniel Ortega a response on the proposal to advance the general elections for March 2019, as an exit to the socio-political crisis that the country faces since last 18 April.In Managua most of the streets are empty, private businesses such as convenience stores, supermarkets and businesses did not open their doors. Medardo Mairena and Pedro Mena, members of the Nicaraguan Peasant Movement, were held at the Augusto C. Sandino International Airport in Managua. According to people accompanying them, Migration personnel detained them and do not know of their whereabouts. "They were detained, we do not know for what reason, we do not know if they were removed on the other hand or if they are still detained," said Alfredo Mairena, a member of the Peasant Movement On the same day in the afternoon, police and paramilitaries attacked the Rubén Darío University Campus (RURD) of the UNAN Managua. After hours under attack the students took refuge in the nearby Church of Divine Mercy where they were attacked by police and paramilitaries, after the youths left the facilities the paramilitaries set fire to the university campus setting fire to a CDI and one of the pavilions of the college
- 14 July – A caravan was organized by the Civic Alliance which was held around midnight and in the early hours of 14 July arrived at the vicinity of the temple, blocked by a police checkpoint located at the traffic lights of Club Terraza towards the west. The parish of Divine Mercy was attacked and besieged throughout the night of Friday the 13th and the early morning of Saturday the 14th, leaving a result of 2 students dead. The bullet holes in the walls, windows and religious objects in addition to the bloodstains were still visible in the days following the attack. The peasant leaders Mairena and Mena are accused of terrorism and involved in the Morrito incident, where several policemen died.263 President Daniel Ortega made the tactical retreat to Masaya (to be held on the last Friday of June) on Friday, 13 July, but instead of the usual walk a vehicular caravan was made to Masaya. The president headed the caravan amid a strong presence of police and paramilitaries. Unlike other years, they did not arrive until the indigenous town of Monimbo but the caravan culminated in the police station of Masaya, where the president called for peace and accused the demonstrators of terrorists in a speech of less than 10 minutes. Among other differences to previous years in 2018, there were no folk dances, nor cultural acts, nor was there the support of the mayor of varas (Monimbo). After the small act, the city of Masaya and especially the indigenous people of Monimbo were strongly attacked by police and paramilitary forces. In the end the paramilitaries were withdrawn by the same population. In Diriamba it was learned of the homicide of an ecologist activist citizen of Costa Rica residing in Nicaragua. Nicaraguan youth group takes refuge in Costa Rica after the bloody incidents of Carazo. On 14 July, clashes were reported in Granada, Masaya and Managua. Leaving two students killed by Nicaraguan police and pro-government paramilitary forces had to go with the presence of Cardinal Brenes, the apostolic Nuncio accompanied by members of the national and international organizations to rescue the wounded and besieged.268 those rescued were received at the Cathedral of Managua, where they were received by ecclesiastical authorities and national and international human rights organizations. In the cathedral were also dozens of people waving flags of Nicaragua and UNAN to receive the students. In Chontales, there were strong confrontations between peasants and members of the paramilitary and government police forces where they raised the blockades and closures. of streets; In this repressive action, Gabriel Mareira, brother of the peasant leader Alfredo Marinera, came out severely wounded.

==== White and Blue Caravan ====
- 14 July – The blue and white caravan was made, where thousands of citizens in their cars and adorned with the Nicaraguan flag expressed their dissatisfaction and opposition to the government of Daniel Ortega. The gigantic caravan was developed in Managua and had replicas in almost all the departments of the country. In several cities of the departments of Nicaragua there were marches and protests to request the departure of the Nicaraguan presidential couple. In Granada attacks have been reported against the blue and white caravan where there were several wounded.
- 15 July – At least 10 people, including a young girl, were killed in Nicaragua after pro-government forces launched an operation in the country's south, a rights group has said. The Nicaraguan Association for Human Rights (ANPDH) said that six civilians and four riot police officers died on Sunday in the city of Masaya, as well as in the nearby Niquinohomo and Catarina communities and the Monimbo neighbourhood.Among the dead was a 10-year-old girl who was shot in the stomach and died due to a lack of medical attention, ANPDH head Alvaro Leiva said Amid great secrecy and under a wide police deployment in the Central Judicial Complex Managua, a preliminary hearing was held behind closed doors for three young people accused of the arrests in Managua, Nindirí, Ticuantepe and Masaya, and for having burned the facilities of the Radio Ya.The police deployment generated an atmosphere of confusion, because it was supposed to be presented before the judge the peasant leader Medardo Mairena Sequeira, arrested Friday at the airport and accused of the death of four officers and a civilian in Morrito, last Thursday.The judge Sixth Criminal District Hearing of the capital, Henry Morales, scheduled the initial hearing for next 8 August at 9:00 a.m. A group of supporters of the Sandinista government attacked in the trade on Sunday, 15 July 2018, the vehicle in which Monsignor Abelardo Mata, bishop of the Diocese of Estelí and spokesperson for the Episcopal Conference of Nicaragua (CEN), was being transported. Mata was intercepted by a group of people who damaged the vehicle and shouted "murderer", "coup" and "criminal", and he took refuge in a nearby house, witnesses said. The official media justified the aggression in their social networks, arguing that it was a sign of the repudiation "of those accused of promoting the terrorist acts sponsored by the coup leaders throughout Nicaragua." Jairo Velásquez, a priest from Catarina, suffered an assault by para-policemen at the Santa Catalina Church today, his brother José Alberto Velásquez confirmed to El Nuevo Diario. In the hours of this afternoon, armed individuals entered the house with surprise and violence. of the Santa Catalina parish, which is under the administration of Father Jairo Velásquez, in Catarina, and they beat him. The offices of Caritas Internationalis in the municipality of Sébaco, Matagalpa, were looted and later set on fire by unknown persons.

==== International pressure and Anti-Terrorism Law ====
- 16 July – The international community has intensified pressure on the Government of Nicaragua to stop the repression and disarm the paramilitaries after nearly 300 deaths during three months of protests demanding the ouster of President Daniel Ortega. The United States, 13 Latin American countries and the Secretary General of the UN, Antonio Guterres, asked the Executive of Daniel Ortega the end of the repression of the demonstrations that since last 18 April flood the streets of the Central American country. Guterres called for an immediate cessation of violence and dared to point out the responsibility of the president, at least indirectly. The Office of the United Nations High Commissioner for Human Rights denounced that the Law on terrorism proposed by President Ortega on April 4 and approved today by the National Assembly of Nicaragua can be used to criminalize peaceful protest. Nueva Guinea takes to the streets to protest against the Government of Nicaragua. The National Police presented two doctors who had participated as volunteers in the seizure of the National Autonomous University of Nicaragua (UNAN-Managua), accusing them of transporting firearms that supposedly had been hidden in the Divine Mercy Church, where more than One hundred people took refuge and were besieged by para-police forces on Friday night and early Saturday morning.The doctors, identified as Irving Escobar, 29, and Blanca Cajina Urbina, 25, were presented Monday at a press conference at the Directorate of Judicial Assistance (DAJ), also known as El Chipote, along with 22 other defendants. of terrorism and other crimes.
- 17 July – The Ministry of Foreign Affairs of Nicaragua raised its "strongest protest" for the "biased declarations" of the Office of the United Nations High Commissioner for Human Rights, which denounced that the law on terrorism approved by National Assembly can be used to criminalize the protest.

==== Masaya Attack ====
- 17 July –There are attacks by Sandinista paramilitary forces and members of the National Police of Nicaragua in the city of Masaya, specifically in the Moninbo neighborhood. This city, located 35 kilometers southeast of Managua, has endured almost two months of siege by the government since last April a wave of violence broke out in this country that has already claimed more than 350 deaths.The National police of Nicaragua and Sandinista paramilitary forces have started an attack on the Monimbó neighborhood, in Masaya, at 6:00 in the morning, after having entered through different parts of the city. Church bells rang to alert the population. The Government of Nicaragua carried out a new armed attack against a population of the Central American country, this time in the city of Masaya, rebel fief against the government of President Daniel Ortega, despite national and international repudiation, with a balance of at least 3 deaths, that they join a list of more than 350 people killed in a crisis that lasts more than three months. The Sandinista government took control of Masaya, 29 kilometers southeast of Managua, after an intense bombing, of more than 7 hours, with emphasis on the indigenous community of Monimbó with support from police and masked persons. The representative of the Campesino Movement in the national dialogue, Medardo Mairena, was accused along with nine other persons of the crimes of terrorism, organized crime, murder, simple kidnapping, aggravated robbery, obstruction of public services (transportation) and injuries to the detriment of 23 people and the State of Nicaragua. In the preliminary hearing held on Tuesday behind closed doors in the Sixth Penal Court District of Hearing, in charge of Judge Henry Morales, was also accused the peasant leader Pedro Mena Amador, imprisoned next to Mairena last Friday at the international airport of Managua. The other defendants are Juan Calderón, Carlos Zamora, Luis Marenco, Silvio Pineda, Mario Jiménez, Danilo García, Arlen Lanuza and José Hernández. For all, Judge Henry Morales issued arrest warrant.
- 18 July – Citizens of Juigalpa denounced that Ortega's mobs came to attack the people who were in the sit-down that they demonstrators carried out.

==== 19 July ====
Irelanda Jerez, one of the leaders of the movement of self-appointed women who participate in the protests against the government of Daniel Ortega. The relatives of the dentist and merchant of the Oriental market, Ireland Jérez, have confirmed that their relative is in El Chipote prison, in Managua. Dollma Jérez said that at 6:45 in the morning they confirmed that her sister is in El Chipote and hopes that his physical integrity is respected. Moninbo neighborhood is occupation for gubernamental sandinistas forces.Samuel Geovanny Martinez Duarte, member of the April 19 University Movement in Granada, has been remanded in custody, after being taken to a preliminary hearing, under a strong police guard, to repsonder for the crime of threat.Martinez is accused for the crimes of threat to the detriment of Yaroslava Muñoz Maltez, departmental delegate of the MTI in Granada. During a speech before thousands of Sandinistas in a plaza in Managua, the president denounced that many temples were occupied as barracks to store ammunition in the framework of the sociopolitical crisis that Nicaragua is going through since April 18.The Episcopal Conference (CEN), mediator and witness of the national dialogue, proposed to Ortega to advance the general elections for March 31, 2019, without him being able to stand for reelection, to overcome the crisis.Ortega revealed that when the bishops made that proposal, on June 7, he was surprised and when he received the document, which in addition to advancing the elections plans the restructuring of the State, he said: "They are committed to the coup."

- 22 July – The bishops of the Episcopal Conference of Nicaragua (CEN) will continue as mediators in the national dialogue despite "the confrontational attitude" of the government, which accused them of coup plotters, Catholic Church of Nicaragua today began a day of fasting and praying the prayer of exorcism to San Miguel Arcángel, in "reparation for desecrations" in these last three months "against God" with the violence unleashed in the country, which has been charged between 277 and 351 lives.
- 23 July – Pro-Sandinista government supporters turn against the television channel 100% Noticias Santa María de Pantasma marches in support of students, bishops and other members of society. On the national day of the Nicaraguan student there were marches for and against the government of Daniel Ortega throughout Nicaragua. Brazilian student Rayneia Gabrielle Lima, 31, was shot dead Monday night in an attack by armed individuals in the area of the American school in Managua. The woman was three months away from completing her medical degree. The rector of American University (UAM), Ernesto Medina accuses paramilitary forces, while Nicaraguan police denied that any paramilitary forces were involved, blaming the murder on an unidentified "private security guard".
- 24 July – Daniel Ortega said on Monday that he will not resign from the presidency of Nicaragua before finishing his term in 2021, ignoring the demand of opponents who demand his immediate exit from power to overcome the crisis. The Nicaraguan Association for Human Rights (ANPDH) revealed that 758 people had been reported as kidnapped by armed hooded civilians and police throughout the country between Sunday and dawn on Monday.

A new attack by the "combined forces" of the Government of Nicaragua left at least 3 dead in the northern part of the country, reported today the "self-convened" demonstrators from the city of Jinotega. The attack, which lasted for more than 8 hours between Monday night and early Tuesday morning, occurred in the Sandino neighborhood of Jinotega, 163 kilometers north of Managua, known as "the Monimbo del norte", due to the strong resistance to the government of Daniel Ortega.

- 28 July – on July 28 a massive march of reparation was carried out against the Government of Ortega and in support of the Nicaraguan Curia.
- 31 July – The US congressmen Ileana Ros-Lehtinen and Mario Díaz Balart met cbroson miem of the Nicaraguan community, in South Florida, to talk about the crisis in that country.The Permanent Human Rights Commission of Nicaragua (CPDH) has so far recorded 300 murdered in the context of the protests. On the afternoon of July 31, the self-appointed health personnel held a demonstration called "March for health, united by life." The starting point will be the Alexis Argüello monument and will end at the Jean Paul Genie roundabout in Managua against political persecution and dismissals in the public health sector encouraged and executed by the Government of Daniel Ortega. The UN Refugee Agency (UNHCR) today called on the international community "solidarity" with Costa Rica and other countries that welcome the "thousands" of Nicaraguans fleeing their country, submerged in the bloodiest crisis since the decade from the 1980s. The Government of Nicaragua rejected a special commission of the Organization of American States, OAS, to mediate the country's crisis. The proposal was presented by the United States, Argentina, Brazil, Colombia, Canada, Chile, Mexico and Peru. Daniel Ortega said that they try to meddle in matters that belong to his government and rejected the initiative through a note of protest sent to the Inter-American agency. Students of the UNAN-León, as well as representatives of the April 19 University Movement, Blue and white, self-called and the same population, left to march to demand justice and democracy.

=== August ===
- 1 August – The president of Nicaragua, Daniel Ortega, said that the influence of jihadist terrorism of the self-styled Islamic State arrived in his country and gave as an example the murders that have taken place in the framework of the protests against his government since last April 18.

"It seems that the influence of ISIS has come through the (social) networks to Nicaragua," the president said. The head of the Nicaraguan Army, General Julio César Avilés, said that the country's sociopolitical crisis is also a time to reflect and contribute. Dialogue is the "most convincing" route for Nicaraguans to overcome the socio-political crisis their country is going through, said the head of the Nicaraguan Army, General Julio César Avilés. This at the same time to stop the protests started on April 18 and which have already left between 295 and 448 dead. The socio-political crisis in Nicaragua has caused the closure of several universities in the Central American country. Nicaragua loses 230 million dollars in tourism due to crisis. In the Countryside of Nicaragua there is protest for the release of political prisoners and detainees.

- 2 August – With the approval of twenty countries, the Organization of American States (OAS) created on Thursday a special commission to contribute to the search for solutions to the crisis in Nicaragua. Only four countries voted against, including Nicaragua itself.

The working group that will follow up on the situation in Nicaragua has not yet been formed, but the representatives of the United States, Costa Rica, Brazil and Chile expressed interest. A group of Nicaraguan women, headed by the poet Gioconda Belli, requested by means of a letter to the Nicaraguan Army to "disarm" the paramilitary groups that "usurp" the functions of the country's armed forces, in the midst of the crisis that has left between 317 and 448 dead since April. He is secretly tried for the assassination of young Brazilian Raiella Grabrielle Lima A source from the Prosecutor's Office informed that Pierson Gutiérrez Solís had pleaded guilty in the preliminary hearing, and that afterwards the penalty debate was proceeded, in which the State requested the minimum for homicide: 10 years in prison; and six months for illegal carrying of weapons.

- 3 August – The independent journalists will hold a sit-in at 10:00 a.m., at the Metrocentro roundabout, to demand freedom of the press for Daniel Ortega, since he has been violated by his government, since three months ago the protests in the country began. The brothers Luis Miguel, Jean Carlos, and Harvin Roberto, all of Esteban Lesage surnames, were capturaed by the police, on July 11 and are now being accused of terrorism, organized crime and simple kidnapping, for participating in marches against the government of Daniel Ortega. Doctors from Nicaragua yesterday denounced new layoffs to health workers who have treated protesters injured in protests against President Daniel Ortega, in a crisis that has left between 317 and 448 dead since April.At least 11 doctors and health workers were dismissed for having treated the injured protesters in the department of Carazo, and more than 10 in Masaya, according to a public complaint, issued through the Permanent Commission of Human Rights (CPDH).
- 4 August – Sandinista forces attack and besiege the channel 100% News.

The self-appointed demonstrators of Nicaragua left on Saturday in the streets of Managua, to publicly support the doctors who have been dismissed, who point out political motivations behind their dismissals, for attending protesters wounded in the protests against Daniel Ortega's government. Nicaraguan human rights organizations have denounced arbitrary dismissals of at least 135 doctors, specialists and subspecialists of the public hospitals of the country. Alfredo Mairena, brother of Medardo Mairena, said on Saturday that the leader of the Peasant Movement had been tortured and that they had not allowed a doctor to examine him, to check his health. "I saw my brother nine days ago. They have tortured him to blows. We do not know the state of health, the doctor we are looking for to review it has not been authorized to check it. He told me that there are death threats for me and the whole family", said Alfredo Mairena.

- 18 August – 4 months of protests.
- 20 August – The caravan of vehicles of opponents to the government was intercepted and dispersed by gunfire while on its way to Masaya. At least four people traveling on two motorcycles were captured by paramilitaries, supported by special troops of the National Police under the command of commissioner Ramón Avellán. In recent days, the population of Masaya has reported looting of homes of families of leaders of protests, parapolicías, besides being the city under a strong police and parapolicial device since the barricades of protesters were dismantled in mid-July. At least 40 people have been fired this Monday from the National Autonomous University of Nicaragua (UNAN-Managua), according to one of the people whose employment contract was canceled. The source, who requested anonymity for fear of future reprisals, said that the dismissals have reached plant teachers and administrative workers from various faculties (Humanities, Administration, Medicine) and academic departments. Relatives of Carlos Cárdenas, technical advisor to Monsignor Rolando Álvarez, member of the Episcopal Conference (CEN) at the National Dialogue table, denounced today that hooded people held him against his will and took him to a place they have not confirmed
- 22 August – The government of Daniel Ortega uncovered the persecution at institutional level against Channel 10, the night of this Wednesday, after the Financial Analysis Unit (UAF) announced the opening of "a process of financial intelligence" against Carlos Pastora, manager of that television
- 23 August – A 14-year-old boy who was on his way to school yesterday suffered unprecedented torture in the annals of the country's conflict. Accompanied by his mother, the boy, he reported that a police patrol of the Directorate of Special Operations (DOEP) stopped him when he was going to school and they put him in a booth in the parking lot of District V of the National Police in Managua. There, several hooded officers tortured him, and tattooed the acronym FSLN on his arm with a syringe, he told CPDH. The United Airlines United canceled, for 15 days, its flights to Managua because its crews fear to travel at night and spend the night in Nicaraguan soil. United Airlines is one of the three largest companies in the United States in this field and has its offices in Chicago, Illinois. American Airlines and Delta Air Lines complete the trio of the three largest airlines in that country. Commissioner Francisco Díaz was named by Daniel Ortega as the new head of the National Police, sending Commissioner Aminta Granera to retirement.Ortega makes this appointment to his consort under a presidential decree, despite the sanctions of the Magnitsky Global Law applied to Díaz last July. The young Adriana Gutiérrez, 22 years old; Alejandra Vega, 22 years old; Tadeo Sequeira, 24 years old and Elízabeth Villarreal, 28, members of the April 19 University Movement were captured the morning of this Thursday when they came to Managua to consolidate details of the march to be held this Saturday in Granada. After Carlos Pastora, manager of Channel 10, asked for protection from the Embassy of Honduras in the face of the siege and threats suffered by Daniel Ortega's government, Diana Valladares, Honduran ambassador in Nicaragua, said that they will not "abandon" Pastora and They are working to provide a quick solution. At 9:00 in the morning of Wednesday, the child Erling Vallejos died at the Oscar Danilo Rosales Arguello School Hospital (HEODRA) in León. The minor sick with dengue, was not attended properly because in the welfare center there are no specialists, because these were dismissed by orders of the Sandinista government in past weeks. Nicaraguan political commentator Jaime Arellano and journalist Luis Galeano said nothing will stop them for reporting the truth, despite being threatened with death and imprisonment by government forces

- 25 August – Shots and shots against a convoy of civic forces by pro-government organisms and allies and allies in managua They denounce detention of more than 20 young people who were heading to march in Granada. Protests in Granada and Leon for illegal detention for students university.
- 27 August – The trial for the shooting death of journalist Angel Gahona, originally from Bluefields, came to an end on Monday night, with a verdict of guilt for Brandon Lovo Taylor and Glen Slate, without allowing access to the courts to relatives of the victim and the accused, members of the Interdisciplinary Group of Independent Experts (GIEI) and independent media. The majority of Nicaraguans believe they are innocent because the trial was political because they are not to blame for the fact. The Brazilian-American documentary maker Emilia Mello, who was deported from Nicaragua after being detained by police on Saturday when she was heading to Granada to film an anti-government demonstration, said she was detained for 30 hours and suffered "psychological abuse." Rosario Murillo threatened those who participate in demonstrations against Daniel Ortega to "stop playing with fire", his statements were given in the official media."There are some ridiculous campaigns in social networks, terrorism, terrorism, stop playing with fire," warned Murillo.The vice president issued his warning two days after hundreds of people showed their rejection of Ortega in the streets of the city of Leon, in a demonstration that was shot to death by the National Police, and in which at least 7 young people were arrested .
- 28 August – As a "judicial circus," so called Migueliuth Sandoval, wife of journalist Angel Gahona, the trial in which Brandon Lovo and Glen Slate pleaded guilty, for the murder of Gahona, Monday night. Judge Ernesto Rodríguez, of the Sixth Criminal Trial District, decreed 48 years of prison for young people.The judicial process took place in an environment of irregularities and secrecy. The family of Gahona considers that justice was not done in the case, because for them, the real culprits are the policemen who surrounded the journalist the day he died. In addition, they state that their rights were violated by not allowing them to be in the hearings.

=== September ===
- 2 September – At least two people were wounded by gunshots fired by presumed paramilitaries sympathetic to President Daniel Ortega against an opposition march, which culminated in violence in the eastern part of the Nicaraguan capital.
- 7 September – About 90% of businesses participate in a national general strike in order to demand the release of political prisoners, costing Nicaragua an estimated $20–25 million per day.
- 13 September – A group of feminist women sit and serenade in solidarity with the political prisoners in La Esperanza prison, located on the Masaya road. In front of the police harassment of Nicaraguan citizens, the march was carried out "Vamos Ganando". Idania Flores, Miss Teen Nicaragua 2017, decided to show solidarity with the more than 300 political prisoners of the Government of Daniel Ortega and Rosario Murillo. The young woman showed her support by shaking her head. 10 years and three months of imprisonment in prison for the crimes of attempted murder were condemned, in a court in Managua, human rights activists Jaime Ampié Toledo, Julio Ampié Machado and William Picado.His attorneys filed the appeals to cooperate.
- 14 September – Under protest began the trial for political prisoner Jaime Navarrete Blandón, accused of killing on June 12 of the current year Ariel Ignacio Vivas, 26, who walked with the police knocking down dams in the eastern neighborhoods of Managua. The young Carolina Mileydi Téllez and Luis Napoleón Ríos were kidnapped last night, when they supposedly watered blue and white balloons as a form of protest against the Sandinista government. The General Secretary of the Nicaraguan Association for Human Rights (ANPDH), Álvaro Leiva, will participate on Friday, September 14, in a meeting with the Human Rights Council of the United Nations (UN), where I was invited to expose the violation of the human rights during the crisis in Nicaragua. Cities such as Managua, Nagarote, Jalapa, Bluefields, Condega, Chichigalpa, Ocotal, Mozonte among others dawned with blue and white balloons in their main streets as a form of protest against the Sandinista government. In some of the municipalities the balloons were blown by workers of the mayor's offices, and Sandinista sympathizers who are bothered by this form of protest by the Nicaraguan population.
- 29 September – President Ortega declares that protests against his government are illegal and that those who oppose him "will respond to justice".

=== October ===
- 14 October – The Nicaraguan Police repressed a group of opponents with violence and arrested 38 of them when they tried to protest in the streets of Managua against the president of the country, Daniel Ortega. Daniel Ortega receives an international rejection for the repression that the population of Nicaragua is experiencing. Panama demands the "release" of the detainees this Sunday in Nicaragua, where demonstrators who wanted to protest against President Daniel Ortega were repressed by the police. Indigenous leader Lottie Cunningham was released today in Nicaragua hours after being arrested at the Managua airport along with human rights activist Haydée Castillo, who was imprisoned, the Nicaraguan Center for Human Rights (Cenidh) reported.The leader of the women of the North of Nicaragua, Haydée Castillo, and the defender of the rights of the indigenous women of the Caribbean, Lottie Cunningham, were detained by officials of the General Directorate of Immigration and Aliens at the Augusto C. Sandino International Airport. They were preparing to travel to the city of Washington, United States. Haydee Castillo is still detained on charges of terrorism.
- 15 October – The auxiliary bishop of the archdiocese of Managua, Silvio Báez, criticized the "irrational repression" of the police before the protests in Nicaragua and called on the Government of Daniel Ortega to resume the national dialogue to overcome the sociopolitical crisis.

==== Lipstick Rebellion ====
- 17 October – A lipstick tube became the new and unexpected weapon of those who demand the departure of Ortega. In social networks, many women and men are sharing photos in which they appear with painted lips. #SoyDelPicoRojo, proclaim proud and challenging, using the colloquial name with which Nicaraguans refer to the mouth. And, often, the image is accompanied by a call for the release of "political prisoners" or the #SOSNicaragua label. Some 200 people are being tried in the Central American country on the charge of terrorism. The 38 captured Sunday, however, were the first to be arrested after the Nicaraguan Police warned that they would not allow demonstrations without their prior authorization. Among them was Marlen Chow, a former Sandinista sympathizer, who once in El Chipote, decided to use her lipstick as a form of protest released the next day, her answer baffled her interrogators, because she showed them "that we were not willing to cheat (scare)." But her simple and defiant gesture also did something else: she gave the Nicaraguans who protest against Ortega a new way of expressing their discontent without exposing themselves to jail.
- 23 October – After growing 4.0% to 4.5% during the last five-year period, the Nicaraguan industrial sector forecasts a reduction to -0.5% for 2018. Even though, companies in the sector took all the precautions that contributed to keep them in operation.Given the Government's proposals to try to mitigate the economic effects of the political crisis with economic measures, industrialists demand political decisions. "First, the political crisis should be resolved, all COSEP (The Private Enterprise Council) chambers have been emphasizing since five months ago. That’s why we are part of the Civic Alliance for Justice and Democracy—the dialogue than we yearn for should take place," said Sergio Maltez, President of the Chamber of Industries of Nicaragua (CADIN), on the television program "Esta Noche" (Tonight)
- 24 October – Group of paramilitaries related to the government of Daniel Ortega illegally kidnaps and detains people. The Nicaraguan Catholic Bishops' Conference (CEN) described as "media attacks" the accusations of Sandinista sympathizers against Monsignor Silvio José Báez, whom they accuse of being the "leader of the barricades in Nicaragua" and ordered him to leave the country or be prosecuted for "terrorist, coup plotter and murderous ", based on an audio in which the priest allegedly" conspires "against the government. For several hours, an official audio was transmitted in official media that would have been recorded during a supposed meeting with peasant leaders.The alleged Christian community San Juan Pablo Apóstol today revealed the audio of a conspiracy meeting between the auxiliary bishop of the Archdiocese of Managua, Silvio Báez, and peasants, with the objective of destabilizing the Nicaraguan government.
- '29 October – The TV Channel 100% News reported that the Nicaraguan Institute of Telecommunications and Post (Telcor), ordered 100% news out of the UHF channel 15 channel. According to Miguel Mora, director of 100% Noticias, Telcor, through a press release, ordered the cable companies to take the 100% news signal from channel 15 in an open signal. The National Police of Nicaragua captured Gerson Snyder Suazo, 22, on Sunday. The incident happened around 7:00 p.m, when he left the parish of San Blas, in the municipality of Chichigalpa, where a mass was held in support of the auxiliary bishop of Managua, Silvio Báez, who is a regular participant in anti-government protests, had thrown balloons in the air minutes before being arrested.

=== November ===
- 2 November – The Government of Nicaragua declared November 2 as a holiday with pay for public employees, on the occasion of the celebration of the Day of the Dead, reported the vice president of the Central American country, Rosario Murillo."Two of November will be granted as a holiday with salary to workers and employers of the public sector, centralized entities and companies attached to it," said the First Lady.
- 23 November – On April 20, Rosario Murillo, vice president of Nicaragua and wife of President Daniel Ortega, ordered the political secretaries of the Sandinista Front in the country's public institutions to "take it immediately" by state officials and supporters of the party's most important points. important to Managua to counter the protests that had begun two days before and demanded the end of eleven years of Sandinista government.
- 26 November – The regime of Daniel Ortega and Rosario Murillo raised their harassment against feminist movements, in a day of harassment and abuse that culminated on Monday with the expulsion from the country of feminist leader Ana Quirós, a Costa Rican citizen and nationalized for several decades in Nicaragua. Along with Quirós, three residents of European origin were cited without reason by the General Directorate of Immigration and Foreign Affairs (DGME) to appear on Monday at their offices, where they were held for hours.
- 28 November – U.S. President Donald Trump signed an executive order to sanction the Nicaraguan authorities for participating in human rights abuses, in the democratic retreat in the Central American country and to pose a "threat to national security." In its third round of sanctions against Nicaragua, the Treasury Department has risen up the political ladder to reach Rosario Murillo, the appointed vice president and wife of President Daniel Ortega, and Néstor Moncada Lau, national security adviser.

=== December ===
- 1 December – Independent journalists constitute a new association to defend their rights and fight against the Ortega regime.
- 3 December – The director of the 100% Noticias television channel, Miguel Mora, denounced on Monday that sympathizers of the Government of Nicaragua accuse him of crimes he has not committed, as part of a campaign to censor him. Nicaraguan police illegally seizes Radio Leon transmission equipment and illegally detains 4 journalists and workers of that meisora in the city of Leon in Nicaragua. Daniel Ortega lashes out at his brother, the former head of the Nicaraguan Army, Humberto Ortega, during the closing ceremony of the XVI Congress of the National Union of Students of Nicaragua (UNEN). "The general of the Army was Humberto Ortega, who with the departure of the government decided to spend with those who had won the elections, and became one more in the service of the empire," said Ortega who described him as "a pawn of the oligarchy and imperialism. "He also justified the worst massacre in the history of Nicaragua that he made since last April, and again attacked the bishops of the Episcopal Conference of Nicaragua, whom he called" criminals and terrorists. Ortega accused the bishops of having encouraged barracks and sided with the "punsheir" and attack to the Private sector and the United States. and On the other hand, the eternal sandinista student, Luis Andino in the act asked the National Council of Universities, (CNU) to eliminate the Central American University, UCA, from the budgetary allocation of 6% constitutional."Radio Darío radio station in the city of León, in western Nicaragua, said in a statement that on Monday the headquarters were besieged and their employees handcuffed and their cell phones removed in an operation of more than three hours ordered by the police of President Daniel OrtegaA statement sent to the Voice of America in the early hours of Tuesday indicated that the police ordered to "turn off" the medium that is now off the air.The text said that several patrols moved members of the police headed by the commissioner Fidel Dominguez, Chief of Police of this city, who entered the facilities after threatening to knock down the doors if they were not allowed access.
- 4 December – This morning the sports chronicler Miguel Mendoza was assaulted with his wife the journalist Margin Pozo, when they left their home. The subjects of unknown identity, they aimed at him, stole his truck and the belongings they carried. Cardinal Leopoldo Brenes said that the Catholic Church only provided a mediation service in the national dialogue, referring to the speech of the dictator Daniel Ortega, who on Monday night accused the bishops of having encouraged attacks and sided with the "golpistas" "Brenes, who claimed not to have listened to Ortega's words, said that "when he (Ortega) called me and I told him that he was going to consult with the Conference if we gave this service and the Episcopal Conference assumed it as a service. We are here to serve, we never want to occupy a temporary power because we serve the Church, we serve Jesus Christ, we serve our communities as pastors, "he said. The manager of Channel 10, Carlos Pastora, is in the United States after having requested protection from the Embassy of Honduras in Nicaragua, on August 22, as a result of the persecution that Daniel Ortega's regime carried out against him.The statement of the Secretary of State for Foreign Affairs and International Cooperation of Honduras, explained that Pastora left the country on Monday to the United States. The International Association of Broadcasting - AIR, which represents more than 17 thousand radio and television stations in the Americas, expresses its strong condemnation and rejection of the raid and closure of Radio Darío in the city of León, by the Police of Nicaragua, which took place this Monday, December 3. The Office of the High Commissioner for Human Rights of the Organization of the United Nations (OACNUDH) urged the Government of Nicaragua to respect freedom of expression and stop acts of siege and intimidation against journalists and independent media. The White House National Security Advisor John Bolton contrasted Tuesday the "hopeful signs" that are seen in Latin America, especially with the "enormous change" that the arrival of Jair Bolsonaro in Brazil, in front of what he calls the "troika of tyranny," composed of Cuba, Venezuela and Nicaragua. "We have to face those regimes (Nicaragua, Cuba and Venezuela) and free their people. I think that throughout the continent is not just a US project, it is increasingly a project of all democratic countries in the region," he said.

== See also ==
- Timeline of the 2020 Nicaraguan protests
