= 2018 Nicaraguan protests =

Wave of protests in Nicaragua

- Part of the protests against Daniel Ortega
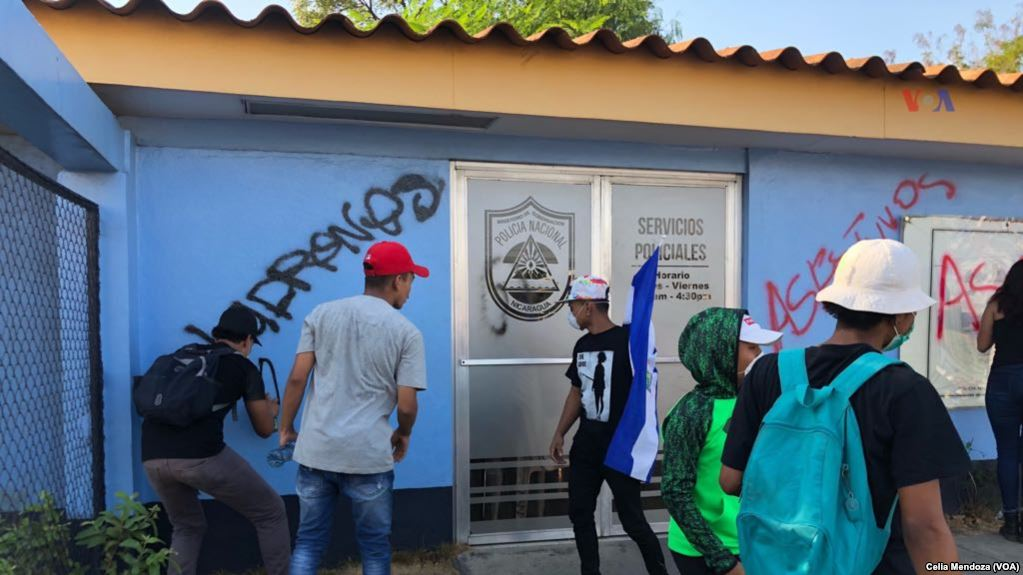
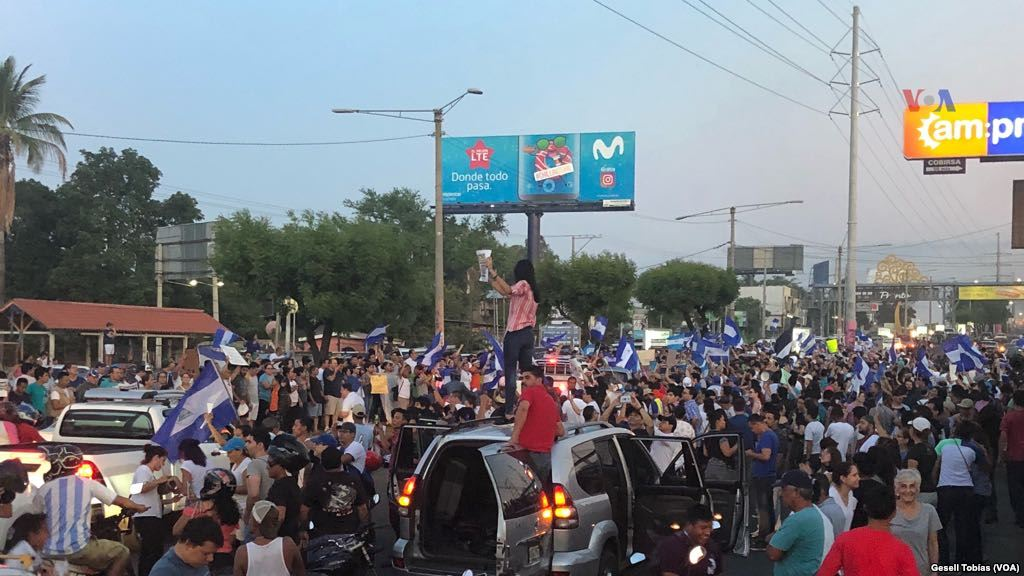
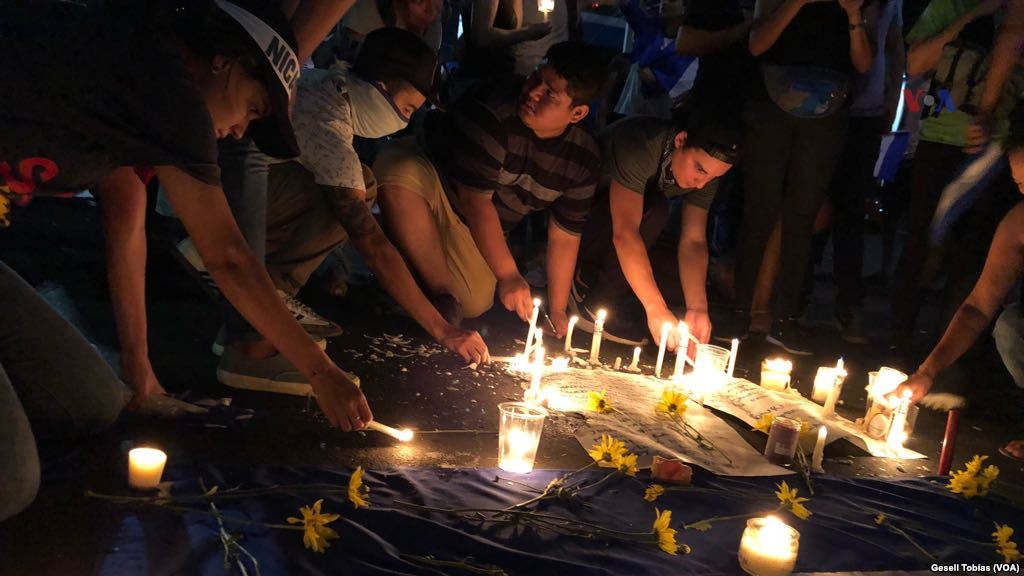
- Situation of Nicaragua during the development of the protests (April 2018) Top to bottom: Protests in Managua, Nicaragua 2018. Large crowds demonstrating in Managua. A candlelight vigil held in respect to those killed.
- Date: 18 April 2018 – 17 July 2018
- Location: Nicaragua
- Caused by: Social security reform; Corruption; Authoritarianism and police brutality of President Daniel Ortega; Femicides
- Goals: Cancellation of social reforms and Nicaragua Canal; End of political violence and release of detained protesters; Restoration of free speech in media outlets; Reformation of the Supreme Electoral Council, including the resignation of all magistrates in duty; End of femicides; Concrete legal protection of indigenous people and indigenous lands; Resignation of President Ortega and Rosario Murillo
- Methods: Demonstration; Student activism; Internet activism; Riots
- Status: Political crisis in Nicaragua from 2018 to the present; Political persecution of opponents; Persecution and harassment of the Catholic Church and parishioners; Forced exile and statelessness of several Nicaraguan citizens; Sanctions from the European Union and the United States against key figures and institutions of the regime of Daniel Ortega and his wife; Sanctions from Swiss Government against key figures and institutions of the Ortega regime; Nicaragua's departure from the OAS and the expulsion of the international organization from Nicaraguan territory; 88,000 Nicaraguans in exile; Breaking of diplomatic relations between the Holy See and the Nicaraguan regime; Confiscations of assets of political opponents; Closure of universities and private educational institutions; Creation of the Nica Act; Creation Renacer Act; The regime of Daniel Ortega and Rosario Murillo expels the International Committee of the Red Cross from Nicaragua in December 2023.
- Concessions: Cancellation of social reforms

Parties
Opposition: Students; April 19 University Movement; Superior Council for Private Enterprise; Catholic Church; Sandinista Renovation Movement; Constitutionalist Liberal Party; Independent Liberal Party; Nicaraguan Liberal Alliance; Conservative Party; Alliance for the Republic; YATAMA	Government of Nicaragua: National Police of Nicaragua; FSLN; Sandinista Youth; (Nicaragua) Pro-Ortega paramilitaries

Lead figures
Suyén Barahona; José Adán Aguerri; Medardo Mairena; Lesther Alemán	Daniel Ortega; Rosario Murillo; Aminta Granera; Francisco Javier Díaz Madriz; Martha Elena Ruiz Sevilla

Number
Hundreds of thousands: 45,000+ (23 April); 25,000+ (28 April)	

Casualties
- Deaths: 325–568
- Injuries: 2,800+
- Arrested: 600+–1,500

The 2018 Nicaraguan protests began on 18 April 2018 when demonstrators in several cities of Nicaragua began protests against the social security reforms decreed by President Daniel Ortega that increased taxes and decreased benefits. After five days of unrest in which nearly thirty people were killed, Ortega announced the cancellation of the reforms; however, the opposition has grown through the 2014–2018 Nicaraguan protests to denounce Ortega and demand his resignation, becoming one of the largest protests in his government's history and the deadliest civil conflict since the end of the Nicaraguan Revolution. On 29 September 2018, political demonstrations were declared illegal by President Ortega.

== Background ==
=== Pensions for small contributors ===
The protests began in June 2013 when some elderly people demanded a reduced pension from the Nicaraguan Social Security Institute for people with only a small contribution (less than 750 weeks). Soon, students and young people joined their protests. After a week of demonstration, the peaceful protesters were attacked by paramilitary groups associated with the Sandinista Youth, while police had moved back only moments before. Later, to calm down the protests, concessions to the pensioners were made by President Daniel Ortega to supply a reduced pension.

=== Proposed canal ===
Over a year later protests started again, this time opposing the construction of a proposed Chinese-funded inter-oceanic canal through Nicaragua, with environmental impact, land use, and indigenous rights, as well as Nicaraguan sovereignty among the chief concerns of demonstrators. By February 2018, the project was widely viewed as defunct, though a 60% absent vote to revoke the 2013 legislation creating the project, the Chinese company (HKND) granted the concession to develop the canal maintains legal rights to it as well as to ancillary infrastructure projects.

=== Forest fires ===
In early April 2018, demonstrators marched in Managua, the country's capital, to protest what they regarded as an insufficient government response to forest fires that burned 13,500 acres (5,500 hectares) of the Indio Maíz Biological Reserve, a tropical nature preserve that is home to Rama and Kriol indigenous people, as well as significant biodiversity and endangered species. There were suspicions that the government had an interest in the fire, as it is the largest natural reserve through which the Nicaraguan Canal is planned to make. Counterprotests also occurred at the time in support of the Sandinista Front government.

=== INSS crisis ===
In 2013, the Nicaraguan Social Security Institute was in a deficit situation that had been grown annually, reaching 2,371 million Nicaraguan córdobas by the end of 2017. This deficit has increased by over 50% annually for the last two years. The IMF alerted Nicaragua in 2017 that in the absence of the reform, the cash reserves would be depleted by 2019. The government of Daniel Ortega prepared a reform plan for the INSS based on the IMF's report. The government rejected some of the proposed remedies, such as increasing the retirement age, arguing that older people have fewer possibilities of finding employment, and that the urgency of the reform required fast results to ensure the INSS's viability, as some measures suggested by the IMF would not yield results for three or four years.

In early April 2018, the Superior Council for Private Enterprise (COSEP) announced the start of negotiations with the government to reform the INSS, declaring that the solution must include an increase to the contribution of the employers and employees, as well as fiscal reform. These negotiations excluded small and medium-sized enterprises. The reforms were announced on 16 April 2018, and published by presidential decree in March 2018 in La Gaceta (official government record) on 18 April 2018. The reform included an incremental increase of 0.75% (from 6.25% to 7%) on the employee contribution and 2% (from 19% to 21%) on the employers, starting July 2018. The employers' contribution would increase annually until reaching 22.5% in 2020. Pensions would also be taxed 5%. The 5% tax has been criticized as unconstitutional, since only the National Assembly has the power of taxation, and Law 160, signed by Ortega, indicates that pensions are not subject to any retentions.

The government-aligned unions Workers' National Front and the Employees National Union supported the reform, while the COSEP rejected it, indicating it did not have consensus and filed a writ of amparo in an attempt to reverse it.

== Events ==
=== First protests ===
Citizens protest on 18 April after already being angered by the handling of the fires in response to the Ortega administration's announcement of social security reforms that raised income and payroll taxes while reducing pension benefits by 5%. Demonstrations involving mostly elderly individuals, university students, and other activists broke out in Managua and six other cities, which were repressed by authorities reporting to President Ortega. Authorities were seen using live ammunition on protesters while also arming Sandinista Youth members with weapons. At least 26 people were killed, including journalist Ángel Gahona of the news program Meridiano, with Gahona being shot to death outside of the city hall in Bluefields while streaming on Facebook Live. Various forms of independent media were censored during the protests.

Anti-riot police outside the National University of Engineering loading ammunition in Managua, 19 April 2018.

The following day on 19 April, Vice President and first lady Rosario Murillo made a speech mocking the demonstrators, calling them "small groups, small souls, toxic, full of hate", bent on the destruction of the country, assaulting peace and development. She also labeled the demonstrators that had been attacked as "aggressors" and the attack by pro-Ortega groups and police as "legitimate defense". Protests began to intensify with confrontations occurring in León, Managua, Granada, Boaco, Carazo, Estelí, Rivas, Matagalpa and Masaya. TELCOR ordered the suspension of transmissions of four independent TV channels that were reporting the news: channels 12, 23, 51, and 100% Noticias. Also the Catholic Episcopal Conference's TV channel. The suspension lasted several hours, except for 100% Noticias, who was off the air until 25 April. Murillo accused the protesters of being manipulated and trying to "destabilize" and "destroy" Nicaragua.

On 21 April, two days after the beginning of protests and the subsequent crackdown by authorities, Ortega made his first public appearance and announced he would hold negotiations for a possible revision of the reforms, planned to take effect on 1 July 2018; however, he stated he would meet only with business leaders and alleged that demonstrators were being manipulated by gangs and other political interests. Demonstrations increased in response, with protesters objecting to the repression of demonstrations and the exclusion of other sectors from the negotiations, as well as the reforms themselves. The COSEP business chamber announced it would only participate in the negotiation if police violence ceased, detained protesters were released and free speech were restored. Nicaragua's Roman Catholic Conference of Bishops also called for an end to the police violence and criticized unilateral reforms; Pope Francis subsequently added his call for peace in the country.

=== Cancellation of social security reforms ===
As the press began to describe the unrest as the biggest crisis of Ortega's presidency, Ortega announced the cancellation of the social security reforms on 22 April, acknowledging they were not viable and had created a "dramatic situation". He again proposed negotiations on the issue, which would now include Catholic Cardinal Leopoldo Brenes as well as the business community.

On 23 April, marches of citizens, businessmen and students were held in Managua demanding the end of violence in the country, the release of students arrested by the police, the cessation of censorship of television media, and a response from the government about the students who died during the protests. The protests were the largest seen during the Ortega administration, with tens to hundreds of thousands of demonstrators participating and calling for the president's resignation. The next day on 24 April 2018, detainees were released by Nicaraguan authorities as a result of dialogue between the government and other organizations.

=== Investigations and resignations ===
Nicaraguan Attorney General Inés Miranda announced on 26 April that a formal investigation into the deaths during the protests. On 27 April, President of the National Assembly Gustavo Porras announced a truth commission to examine the deaths and violence during the unrest. Head of the National Police Aminta Granera announced her resignation in face of the criticism of her handling of the unrest and alleged police repression of protests.

=== Intensification of protests ===
Hundreds of thousands participated in marches for peace and justice organized on 28 April by the Catholic churches in Nicaragua in the cities of Managua, Matagalpa and León. At the events, bishops, feminists, members of the LGBT community, relatives of those killed in the repression and thousands of peasants gathered in unity to demonstrate. Peasants who lived in rural areas traveled to Managua by a caravan of trucks, arriving to protest against the Nicaragua Canal proposal by Chinese businessmen and the Ortega government.

Days later on 30 April, tens of thousands of Ortega's supporters participated in a rally showing him support, though there were some reports of government workers being forced to join the pro-Ortega rally. The rally consisted mostly of singing and dancing to music of the 1960s and 1970s, popular to the former Sandinista guerrillas.

On 2 May, police in riot gear blocked a student march from Central American University (UCA) to the National Assembly, with students instead marching to the Polytechnic University of Nicaragua (UPOLI) to show solidarity with other groups entrenched there. After pro-Ortega groups appeared on their route, they cancelled another planned march, so students reinforced barricades surrounding UPOLI under the watch of authorities. Anonymous Nicaragua hacked the website of the National Police of Nicaragua, calling for them to support of anti-Ortega protesters. The next day, elite troops of the Nicaraguan armed forces and police assaulted UPOLI in the early morning at about 01:00 CT, dispersing students stationed at the university. The incident left six students injured, one seriously. Student group Movimiento 19 de Abril responded to the incident stating that they would not participate in a dialogue with Ortega after he sent forces to attack them, placing peace talks in jeopardy. By 9 May, members of the independent press of Nicaragua condemned the killings, censorship and repression of the Government of Nicaragua.

More than 10 cities were the scene of heavy fighting on 12 May in at least eight departments in the north, center, and Pacific areas of Nicaragua. The biggest clashes took place in Chinandega, Granada, León, Managua, Masaya, and Rivas in the Pacific, as well as Estelí and Matagalpa in the north. In Masaya, the clashes lasted for more than 12 hours between demonstrators, anti-riot police and youth shock groups of the Sandinista party. The following day, President Ortega called for a cessation of violence, reading a short statement, in which he called for "an end to death and destruction, that does not continue to shed blood of Nicaraguan brothers". The Military of Nicaragua assured that it would not engage in acts of repression against citizens who were protesting and advocated a dialogue to help resolve the crisis in the country, according to statements made by spokesman Colonel Manuel Guevara. In a demonstration, thousands of people arrived on 13 May from Managua to Masaya in a caravan to support that city for the loss of at least one life and 150 wounded in the past days.

=== National dialogue and clashes ===
After weeks of conflict, the national dialogue began on 16 May 2018. When Ortega and Murillo arrived at the Seminary of Our Lady of Fatima, the site of the national dialogue, the presidential couple was greeted with shouts of "assassins, murderers" by people on the outskirts of the event.

A delegation from the Inter-American Commission on Human Rights (IACHR) arrived in Nicaragua on 17 May to observe in loco the situation of human rights in the country. The IACHR visit occurred as Nicaraguan human rights organizations were reporting between 61 and 67 people dead and more than 500 injured in the repression exercised against protesters. The delegation was headed by Antonia Urrejola, rapporteur for Nicaragua at the IACHR.

On 18 May, the second day of dialogue, the IACHR now included in talks called "on the State of Nicaragua to immediately cease the repression of the protest, the commission also calls on the State to guarantee the independence and functioning of the media in the country", the rapporteur said, also indicating that the mission of the IACHR in the country will be the observation in the field in accordance with human rights. She indicated that she would meet with all sectors. There was friction between university students and members of the state-media press before the dialogue. The government and the Nicaraguan opposition agreed to a truce over the weekend, a month after having started demonstrations and protests. Several people appeared before the Inter-American Commission to lodge complaints against the violations carried out by the police forces and supporters of the Daniel Ortega government.

The national dialogue continued on its third day on 21 May where the resignation of Ortega and his wife and the Nicaraguan government was requested in order to return the country to normality. The Inter-American Commission on Human Rights (IACHR), issued a preliminary report on the investigations of what happened in the protests in Nicaragua. The IACHR counted at least 76 people killed in the protests in Nicaragua and more than 800 injured, and denounced serious events and violations of human rights by the Government of Nicaragua. It included the official visit of the IACHR to Nicaragua. The representatives of the organization were in Managua, Masaya, León and Matagalpa.

A week after beginning, the National Dialogue between the government of Nicaragua and students, the private sector and civil society was suspended indefinitely. The leader of the Nicaraguan Catholic Church, Bishop Leopoldo Brenes, who had acted as a mediator of this dialogue, explained that the lack of agreement on an agenda of issues to be discussed prevented negotiations from continuing.

On 30 May, the day on which the Nicaraguan mothers are celebrated, a march was held in honor of the victims killed during the protests. It was repressed by the national police in the company of paramilitary groups and pro-government mobs, leaving approximately 15 dead. Most of the victims died from accurate shots to the head, neck and chest. The march was led by the Mothers of April Movement, the Student Movement 19 April, Civil Society and Private Enterprise.

In the early hours of 1 June, there were reports in Masaya of a new wave of looting and robberies against businesses and stores in the city. Movements, associations of professionals and Nicaraguan social groups called for a civic-citizen national strike and civil disobedience since 1 June, as a means of pressure for President Daniel Ortega and his wife, Vice President Rosario Murillo, to leave power. Five banks have closed in Masaya for lootings. The Inter-American Commission on Human Rights (IACHR) condemned the deaths and new acts of violence that occurred in Nicaragua and urged the state to stop the repression of the protests. The IACHR also urges the government to investigate and punish the use of force by parapolitical actors, dismantle these groups, and seek a peaceful, constitutional and democratic solution to the current political crisis affecting the country. On 8 July, at least 38 were killed during skirmishes between protesters, authorities and pro-Sandinista paramilitary groups, raising the death toll to more than 300 Nicaraguans killed since the beginning of protests.

Mobs, some hooded and armed, set out on 9 July surrounding and assaulted Catholic bishops, including Cardinal Leopoldo Brenes, Auxiliary Bishop Silvio José Báez, and the ambassador of the pope in Nicaragua Waldemar Sommertag, after arriving in Diriamba, Carazo. Men in plain clothes, hooded and some armed, first verbally offended the religious and then attacked them physically, wounding some of them, while the journalists robbed and beat. The next day, Vice President of Nicaragua, Rosario Murillo, said that the government presiding over her husband, Daniel Ortega, is "indestructible" and that the opposition "could not" defeat him, while also justifying the actions of violence against the Nicaraguan bishops and the apostolic Nuncio in Diriamba.

On 11 July, the Nicaraguan opposition and academic Felix Maradiaga was attacked in the city of León (northwest Nicaragua) by a group of Sandinista sympathizers of the government of President Daniel Ortega.

=== Cyberattacks ===
Anonymous Nicaragua, part of the Anonymous movement, joined the protests against the government and launched Operación Nicaragua or #OpNicaragua,.a campaign of cyber attacks against Nicaragua's government web pages or accused to be related to it. The campaign started on 26 April with an attack that left the National Assembly website out of service. The attacks continued against the websites of Juventud Presidente, Canal 2, and the Office of the Attorney General of the Republic, the Nicaraguan Institute of Civil Aeronautics, Nicaraguan Institute of Culture, El 19 Digital or Canal 6.

The state agency Nicaraguan Institute of Telecommunications and Postal Services (TELCOR) cited the corporations that provide the internet service to see what actions to take to form unity against hackers. TELCOR summoned these providers to a meeting to address security measures to take around the cyber-attacks executed by the international hackers against web portals of the government and private corporations.

=== Teacher dismissals ===
The dismissal of state teachers who support the demonstrations against the government caused an act of "student disobedience" in the city of Condega, in the north of Nicaragua, which is going through a crisis that has left between 317 and 448 dead since last April. Marist Institute students refused to enter the classrooms, in rejection of the decision of the Ministry of Education (Mined) to dismiss several of their professors "because they have their own criteria and do not support the murderers", informed the Student Movement 19 of April-Condega.

=== Church of Divine Mercy incident ===
Police and paramilitaries attacked the Rubén Darío University Campus (RURD) of the UNAN Managua on 13 July. After hours of facing attacks, more than 100 students took refuge in the nearby Church of Divine Mercy where they were fired upon by police and paramilitaries, after the youths left the facilities the paramilitaries set fire to the university campus setting fire to a CDI and one of the pavilions of the college The Church of Divine Mercy was then the target of attacks and was besieged throughout the night of Friday the 13th and into the early morning of Saturday the 14th, leaving two students dead. The bullet holes in the walls, windows and religious objects in addition to the bloodstains were still visible in the days following the attack.

On 14 July, clashes were reported in Granada, Masaya and Managua. Leaving two students killed by Nicaraguan police and pro-government paramilitary forces had to go with the presence of Cardinal Brenes, the apostolic Nuncio accompanied by members of the national and international organizations to rescue the wounded and besieged. Those rescued were received at the Cathedral of Managua, where they were received by ecclesiastical authorities and national and international human rights organizations. In the cathedral were also dozens of people waving flags of Nicaragua and UNAN to receive the students.

=== Government crackdowns, national lockout, and ban on protests ===
As a result of crackdowns in July 2018, the government forced people from protest centers and established a more firm presence in Nicaragua, though protests still continued in the following months.

The international community intensified pressure on the Government of Nicaragua on 16 July in order to stop the repression and disarm the paramilitaries after nearly 300 deaths during three months of protests demanding the exit of President Daniel Ortega. The United States, 13 Latin American countries and the Secretary-General of the UN, Antonio Guterres, demanded Ortega to end the repression of the demonstration. The Office of the United Nations High Commissioner for Human Rights also denounced the Law on Terrorism that was recently approved by the pro-Ortega Parliament of Nicaragua, which it said can be used to criminalize peaceful protests.

On 17 July, the Ministry of Foreign Affairs of Nicaragua raised its "strongest protest" for the "biased declarations" of the Office of the United Nations High Commissioner for Human Rights, defending the Law on Terrorism. Days later on 24 July, President Ortega said that he will not resign from the presidency of Nicaragua before finishing his term in 2021, ignoring opponents who demanded his immediate exit from power to overcome the crisis.

An early-September general lockout organized to demand the release of political prisoners saw 90% participation of businesses in Nicaragua. It was estimated that the national lockout cost the country $20 million to $25 million per day.

On 29 September 2018, President Ortega declared that political protests were "illegal" in Nicaragua, stating that demonstrators would "respond to justice" if they attempted to publicly voice their opinions. The United Nations condemned the actions as being a violation of human rights regarding freedom of assembly.

=== December raids ===
In December 2018, the government revoked the licenses of five human rights organizations, closed the offices of the cable news and online show Confidencial, and beat journalists when they protested.

The Confidential newspaper and other media were seized and taken by the government of Daniel Ortega Several service stations of the Puma brand were closed in the afternoon of 20 December by representatives of the Nicaraguan Energy Institute (INE), a state entity that has the mandate to regulate, among others, the hydrocarbons sector. Puma Energy entered the Nicaraguan oil and fuel derivatives market at the end of March 2011, when it bought the entire network of Esso stations in Nicaragua as part of a regional operation that involved the purchase of 290 service stations and eight storage terminals of fuel in four countries of Central America.

On 21 December 2018, the Nicaraguan police raided the offices of the 100% News Channel. They arrested Miguel Mora, owner of the Canal; Lucía Pineda, Head of Press of 100% Noticias; and Verónica Chávez, wife of Miguel Mora and host of the Ellas Lo Dicen Program. Subsequently, Verónica Chávez was released. Miguel Mora and Lucia Pineda were accused of terrorist crimes and provoking hatred and discrimination between the police and Sandinistas.

=== Application of the Democratic Charter ===
The Secretary General of the Organization of American States (OAS), Luis Almagro, announced that he would begin the steps for an eventual application of the Democratic Charter to Nicaragua.

== Other events and aftermath ==
=== Dialogue and IACHR resolution ===
The national dialogue began on 16 May. Students led with a strong demand. "We have decided to be at this table to demand them right now to order the immediate cessation of the attacks that are happening in the country," said student leader Lesther Alemán, as protests continued throughout the country. After hearing the student, Ortega questioned the wave of protests, calling it "irrational violence". Monseñor Abelardo Mata made three requests to Ortega.

On 23 May, the national dialogue was suspended. Archbishop Brenes suggested to create mixed commission of three representatives by each part to discuss an action plan to restore the table of the National Dialogue. The Nicaraguan Foreign Minister, Dennis Moncada, objected that the agenda of the National Dialogue involved 40 points that he claimed would all lead to a single point, "an agenda for a coup d'état for a change of government outside the constitution and violating the laws of the country". On the other hand, the university students, businessmen and civil society asked that a Framework Law be debated, which would allow to advance the elections, prohibit the presidential re-election and change the Supreme Electoral Council (CSE).

Following the repression and over a dozen deaths in the 30 May protests, the Nicaraguan archbishops cancelled the National Dialogue and protests continued.

The Inter-American Commission on Human Rights adopted precautionary measures of protection for the entire leadership that make up the University Coalition in Nicaragua and that have led the civic protests against the government since 18 April. The US government urged Nicaragua to fully implement the recommendations of the Inter-American Commission on Human Rights (IACHR) to prevent further violence in the protests against the government of President Daniel Ortega.

=== Violence against protestors ===
At least 42 people were killed in the first week of protests in April, with most injured by bullet wounds. Nicaraguan authorities used live ammunition to fire upon demonstrators resulting in hundreds of injured. Government forces were also reported to have armed pro-Sandinista groups with weapons to use against protesters. Following the government crackdown, rioting and looting ensued. On 2 May 2018, at least 63 people were killed, almost all of the student protesters since the start of the demonstrations. By the end of May, over 105 people killed. As of 4 April 2019, between 325 and 568 have died over the period of the protests.

The United Nations Human Rights Council condemned possible "illegal executions" performed by the Nicaraguan government.

In July 2018, police arrested the mayor of Mulukuku.

Individuals detained during protests denounced torture by the Nicaraguan authorities, with hundreds of prisoners later released by the roadside in the outskirts of Managua with shaved heads and bare feet.

The Inter-American Human Rights Commission received complainsts about families being forced by the government not to file complaints about the deaths of their family members, mistreatment of detainees and threats against human rights defenders in the Central American country.

Many protesters tortured reported hearing both Cuban and Venezuelan accents in the clandestine prisons operated by the Nicaraguan government.

=== Media ===
There were reports of media organizations being censored during the protests. Miguel Mora, the director of 100% Noticias de Nicaragua, stated that the Nicaraguan government censored his channel on cable networks in the country. The censorship of 100% Noticias was not lifted until 25 April. One journalist, Ángel Gahona, was shot and killed while reporting on the protests on Facebook Live. Radio Darío, a radio station known for being critical of the Ortega government, was said to be attacked and burned down on 20 April 2018 by pro-Ortega groups, leaving the facility at a total loss.

The United Nations Human Rights Council criticized the attacks on media and censorship performed by the Ortega government. The Inter-American Press Association also called on the Ortega administration to stop its efforts of censorship, with its president Gustavo Mohme Seminario stating that its actions toward the media "unmasks the authoritarianism of a government that in its eleven years in power has only sought to dismantle the State for its benefit and that of his family members".

=== Budget ===
Nicaragua cut its spending budget for 2018 by $186.3 million, 1.3% of its GDP, in the midst of the crisis. An amendment sent urgently by President Daniel Ortega mainly affects public investment programs, health and education portfolios, and transfers to municipalities, according to the project approved by the FSLN deputies and their allies.

=== Migration ===
Since the end of July and the beginning of August, the Ministry of Foreign Affairs and Worship and the Directorate of Immigration and Foreigners of Costa Rica reported a moderate increase in the entry of Nicaraguans into Costa Rican territory. According to the United Nations High Commissioner for Refugees (UNHCR), an average of 200 Nicaraguans per day apply for asylum in Costa Rica, overwhelming the country's immigration authorities. In addition, the Commissioner reported that about 8 000 Nicaraguan refuge requests have been reported since the beginning of the protests.

Among the Nicaraguans who had sought refuge in Costa Rica are several university leaders, who fled Nicaragua after constant threats that forced them to leave the country. Among them the university leader Victor Cuadras Andino.

The Vice President and Minister of Foreign Affairs of Costa Rica, Epsy Campbell, reported that more than 1,000 Nicaraguan refugee claims have been denied, in order to avoid an immigration crisis and to prevent the entry of illegal persons and maintain security in the region.

On 3 August 2018 Nicaraguan singer-songwriter Carlos Mejía Godoy reported that he left his country because his life is in danger as part of protests against the government of President Daniel Ortega, of whom he is critical and adding to the hundreds of Nicaraguans who have refuge request

The Nicaraguan Association for Human Rights (ANPDH), highlighted in the rescue of injured, detained or harassed protesters in the Nicaraguan Protests of 2018 announced on Sunday 5 August 2018 the temporary closure of their offices due to serious threats and siege by illegal armed groups sponsored and supported by the President of Nicaragua Daniel Ortega and Rosario Murillo. The flight from Nicaragua of the human rights activist Álvaro Leiva, after the popular singer-songwriter Carlos Mejía Godoy, for threats attributed to pro-government groups, triggered the alarms between humanitarian agencies, the UN and the OAS. Representatives of the Special Follow-up Mechanism for Nicaragua (Meseni) and the Office of the United Nations High Commissioner for Human Rights (Acnudh) discussed this situation.

=== Medicals dismissals ===
The Nicaraguan Medical Association (AMN) denounced the alleged arbitrary dismissals of 146 doctors, specialists and subspecialists of the state health units, as a form of retaliation for their participation or support in the protests carried out in the last three months. With clashes, a medical march in Nicaragua has ended against the dismissals for treating the wounded during the protests against the Ortega government since last April.

=== OAS working group ===
The Organization of American States (OAS) approved the creation of a 'working group' for Nicaragua, whose mission will be to support the national dialogue and contribute to the 'search for peaceful and sustainable solutions' for the crisis, the bloodiest since the 1980s. Nicaragua closed its doors to a Working Group of 12 countries created by the Permanent Council of the OAS, which seeks to support the national dialogue and contribute to the search for solutions to the crisis in the country. The government of President Daniel Ortega declared the presence of that Working Group for Nicaragua unacceptable, which he described as an "interventionist Commission." While so many protests continue in the capital and several departments of the Central American country. Affiliation to the INSS is in a tailspin: Nicaragua retreated to 2005 Villagers who were demonstrating in the municipality of Santa María, in Nueva Segovia, were kidnapped by Sandinista paramilitaries. Citizens participated in a march against the government of Daniel Ortega.

=== Household searches ===
Several families denounced to have had their homes searched without a warrant from Nicaraguan paramilitary and police forces. Video footage of the incident was released from their neighbours, which showed paramilitary groups exiting the premises and leaving on national police vehicles.

=== Expulsion of the United Nations High Commissioner for Human Rights ===
Daniel Ortega expelled from the country the mission of the Office of the United Nations High Commissioner for Human Rights (OHCHR), which denounced the "high degree of repression" of the protests against the Government. announced the president of the Nicaraguan Center for Human Rights (CENIDH), Vilma Núñez, who described as "unprecedented" the decision of the Government of Daniel Ortega, while the Ministry of Foreign Affairs of Nicaragua said in a statement that "they stopped the reasons" they gave walk to that invitation.

=== NCHR legal personality cancellation ===
The National Assembly of Nicaragua, canceled the legal personality of the Nicaraguan Center for Human Rights (Cenidh), the main organization of its subject in this country, which has denounced the abuses and misuses of the Government since April when the demonstrations that demand the departure of the former Sandinista guerrilla began. This decision, considered a "revenge" by activists, is a blow to an organization with a long history in the defense of human rights in the Central American country, which has made it worthy of several international recognitions. The legal personality of Hagamos Democracia was also canceled, an organization dedicated to, among other activities, overseeing the actions of the Nicaraguan Legislative Body. Previously, it had canceled the legal personality of the Institute for Strategic Studies and Public Policies (IEEPP), which directs Felix Maradiaga and the feminist organization Information and Health Advisory Services Center (CISAS), run by feminist Ana Quirós, who three days earlier had been expelled to Costa Rica, by orders of the government of Nicaragua. Accusing them of terrorism and putschists which has outraged international organizations.

The Sandinista parliamentary majority, composed of 70 deputies, has canceled the legal status of three Non-Governmental Organizations (NGOs), including the Institute for the Development of Democracy (Ipade), which is headed by Mauricio Zúniga. The other two organizations that have been canceled this morning are the Segovias Leadership Institute Foundation, led by Hayde Castillo and the Foundation for the Conservation and Development of the South East of Nicaragua (Fundación del Río), directed by Amaro Ruiz.

=== Nica Act ===
On 20 December 2018, U.S. President Donald Trump signed the Nica Act, a law that imposes a series of financial sanctions on the Nicaraguan government, and on migration to officials involved in acts of violation of human rights. Trump signed the law in the White House, according to information provided to journalists by the press office of former congresswoman Ileana Ros-Lehtinen, one of the driving forces behind the project. The Nica Act was approved in the Senate on 27 November and in Congress on 11 December.

=== Interdisciplinary Group of Independent Experts report ===
Repression, torture, and sexual assault "among other crimes. It has been eight months since the last wave of protests against Daniel Ortega's government in Nicaragua began, and the crisis does not seem to subside. The demonstrations have already left at least 325 dead and hundreds injured and detained. On behalf of the Inter-American Commission on Human Rights (CIDH) and the Nicaraguan government itself, the Interdisciplinary Group of Independent Experts (GIEI) began an investigation six months ago to clarify the first deaths. The group presented a report this Friday, two days after being expelled from the country by the Nicaraguan authorities.The report focuses on the violent events that occurred between 18 April and 30 May 2018. In this period, the GIEI has 109 deaths (95 due to firearms), more than 1,400 injured and more than 690 detainees. Where the Nicaraguan government is held responsible for the violent acts.

=== Expulsion of international human rights organizations ===
The Nicaraguan government expelled two missions of the Inter-American Commission on Human Rights (IACHR), after accusing them of acting in an "interventionist" and biased manner in their assessment of the country's situation in the context of anti-government protests. The United Nations High Commissioner for Human Rights declared that the country remained "practically without independent human rights bodies," and Michelle Bachelet, declared to be "very alarmed" because the Government of Nicaragua had expelled two MESENI institutions from the country. the GIEI * -established by the Inter-American Commission on Human Rights.

== Responses ==
=== Domestic ===
- Nicaragua – Vice President and First Lady of Nicaragua Rosario Murillo characterized the protesters as "criminals", "vampires in search of blood" and "minuscule and toxic groups." Following his return to public view after being absent for the first 72 hours of protests, President Ortega quickly reversed the social security reform and agreed to a Catholic church-mediated dialogue.

Protesters generally were spread across the political spectrum, and Murillo's statements angered the left-wing sector, which responded by destroying her metal "Trees of Life" public art pieces in Managua. The majority of those demonstrating do not see any negotiation without the results being Ortega's removal.

==== Domestic NGOs ====
The NGO Nicaraguan Center for Human Rights (CENIDH) stated that President Ortega and his wife "encouraged and directed" the repression against protesters and that "the demonstrations are legitimized by a social rejection of the authoritarian way of governing by President Ortega and his wife, Rosario Murillo" and called for dialogue monitored by the United Nations and the Organization of American States.

=== International ===
==== Supranational bodies ====
- European Union – On 20 April 2018, the Delegation of the European Union in Nicaragua and the Heads of Mission of the Embassies of the Member States released a statement lamenting the recent violence, sending condolences to those affected, and calling for dialogue and "social peace". On 31 May 2018, the European Parliament condemned the repression used by the Nicaraguan government and called for elections.
- Organization of American States – Secretary General Luis Almagro condemned "all kinds of violence", calling for peace and stating that citizen have a "legitimate right" to protest. The OAS voted on 18 July 2018 a resolution condemning the Sandinista regime and asks him to hold elections for two years, to March 2019. With 21 votes in favor, three against and the same number of absentees and seven abstentions, the Nicaraguan regime received a harsh attention call.
- United Nations – Liz Throssell, spokesperson for the United Nations Human Rights Council, called on the Ortega government to "comply with its international obligations to ensure that people can freely exercise their rights to freedom of expression and the freedom of peaceful assembly and association", condemned attacks on journalists, and expressed concern "that several television channels that were covering the events have been closed by the Government". Following continued repression, the Human Rights Council demanded the Nicaraguan government to allow entry in order to "gather first-hand information about the incidents arising from the public demonstrations" of April and May. UN Secretary-General Antonio Guterres condemned the ongoing violence in Nicaragua, particularly the killing of a protester during demonstrations in Managua on Wednesday 30 May.

==== Governments ====
- Argentina Brazil Chile Colombia Paraguay Peru – In a joint statement, the Latin American countries shared "concern and regret the acts of violence", making an "urgent call" for all sides to cease hostilities, particularly that "security forces exercise their powers with the utmost prudence to avoid excessive use of force and an escalation of the crisis, allowing the generation of a climate that restores both peace and dialogue, essential to overcome this serious situation".
  - Brazil's Ministry of Foreign Affairs condemned the deepening of repression and the use of lethal and excessive force. The government called for a Nicaraguan ambassador to present herself and provide a statement on the situation. The ministry called for Nicaragua to respect public freedoms and individual rights.
- Canada – Foreign Minister Chrystia Freeland of Global Affairs Canada stated that she was "concerned about reports of several deaths and injuries in the demonstrations that are taking place in Nicaragua" and called for dialogue.
- Costa Rica – Minister of Foreign Affairs Christian Guillermet condemned the censorship of media by the Ortega administration.
- Cuba – The Cuban government defended Ortega, criticizing what it called "attempts that aim to destabilize the Republic of Nicaragua, a country that lives in peace and where remarkable social, economic, and security advances have been made in favor of its people".
- Germany – The Federal Foreign Office called on "all factions to immediately renounce the use of force", asked the government of Nicaragua to "promptly and fully clarify the cases of fatalities", criticized the government's use of force and demanded "free journalistic coverage", stating that "restrictions on press freedom by the Government are unacceptable".
- Luxembourg – Luxembourg suspended aid to Nicaragua.
- Mexico – The Ministry of Foreign Affairs of Mexico called for "the cessation of violence" and supported the idea of dialogue.
- Netherlands – The Netherlands cancelled aid for the Nicaraguan government due to "severe human rights violations, committed by government officials and paramilitary groups".
- Panama – The Government of the Republic of Panama spoke in relation to the armed attacks, arson and crimes recorded in Nicaragua in June 2018, making a firm appeal to those responsible to stop these acts and the "strictest respect for life, human rights, security, and peace". The Ministry of Foreign Affairs of Panama requested that overland shipping of merchandise to Nicaragua be suspended for the duration of the political conflict. In a statement, the Foreign Ministry noted that the ambassador of Panama in Nicaragua, Eddy Davis, kept in touch with truckers who were stranded in Nicaragua and unable to leave the country. In July 2018, Panama reiterated its condemnation of violence in Nicaragua against journalists, clergy, university students and citizens.
- Spain – The Government of Spain demanded the "maximum restraint" of Nicaragua's security forces and supported dialogue.
- United States – Ambassador Michael G. Kozak of the United States Department of State's Bureau of Democracy, Human Rights, and Labor stated that Nicaragua "is going the wrong direction on many fronts" and that the Ortega government had a "long litany" of torture and extrajudicial killing. Kozak criticized censorship, called for the support of NGOs and suggested future targeted sanctions against the Ortega administration, saying that the governments of Cuba and Venezuela are in the "same camp as Nicaragua". The Trump administration has repeatedly condemned and sanctioned the Ortega government for human rights abuses, especially (but not exclusively) after U.S. National Security Advisor John Bolton's troika of tyranny speech in Miami. The most recent sanction was when Trump ratified the NICA Act on 20 December 2018.
  - Puerto Rico – Governor of Puerto Rico Ricardo Rosselló said that "in Nicaragua, an attack against human rights by the government of Daniel Ortega is taking place".
- Uruguay – The Ministry of Foreign Relations released a statement supporting "calls for reflection and dialogue", denouncing violence and demanding "respect for the law and individual rights".
- Vatican City – Pope Francis expressed concern about the violence in Nicaragua, asking that "unnecessary bloodshed be avoided and that open questions be resolved peacefully and with a sense of responsibility".
- Venezuela – President Nicolás Maduro indicated that the government of Daniel Ortega defeated a "terrorist and coup" plan. A day after the Organization of American States (OAS) approved a critical resolution against Ortega's government, Maduro wrote on the social network Twitter: "Today, before the imperial aggression, the government of Nicaragua has defeated the terrorist and coup plan. We will win!" Venezuelan Foreign Minister Jorge Arreaza offered official support to defend the "sovereignty" of the Central American country. During the commemoration of the 39 years of the Sandinista Revolution, in which the foreign ministers of Venezuela and Cuba were the only representatives of the highest level who accompanied Ortega, Arreaza stated: "President Daniel Ortega, if the revolutionaries of Venezuela had to come to Nicaragua to defend Nicaraguan sovereignty and independence, to offer our blood for Nicaragua, we would go like Sandino to the mountain of Nueva Segovia."

==== NGOs ====
- Amnesty International – Director of the Americas Erika Guevara Rosas condemned "brutal attacks against peaceful demonstrators and journalists covering the protest", saying it "represents a flagrant and disturbing attempt to restrict their rights to freedom of expression and peaceful assembly" while also stating that the government "must put an immediate end to all acts of aggression against the public and the press, and conduct an expeditious investigation, impartial and independent to bring to justice all those responsible for these sinister attacks".
- Sao Paulo Forum meeting in Havana and in the voice of the Prime Minister of Saint Vincent and the Grenadines, Ralph Gonsalves said that they should support Venezuela, Brazil and Nicaragua. The Forum expressed its support for the government of Daniel Ortega.

==== Others ====
Several protests abroad accompanied the development of the demonstrations against INSS reform in Nicaragua. There were protests held at the Nicaraguan Embassy in San José (Costa Rica), the consulates in Miami and Houston, and other cities like Ciudad de Guatemala, Madrid or Barcelona. A group of Nicaraguans residing in Panamá demonstrated at the Cinta Costera of Panama's capital. In Spain, there have been at least eight demonstrations by the Nicaraguan community in the country. One of the most active cities was Granada, where hundreds of Nicaraguans and Spaniards have come together to protest for peace, freedom, and democracy in Nicaragua by reading poems of Nicaraguan writers and a manifesto, demanding that the Ortega-Murillo family give up power in Nicaragua. There have also been protests in Berlin, Copenhagen, London, Australia, Vienna, Finland, Paris, San Francisco, New York, Washington, and Toronto.

- Libération – The French newspaper put on its cover Daniel Ortega and his bleeding wife and wrote an article criticizing the Nicaraguan government and its president in 2018.
- José Mujica – The ex-president of Uruguay and senator for the political party Frente Amplio, joined the criticism of the violence in Nicaragua. "Those who were revolutionaries yesterday lost the meaning of life, there are times when you have to say, 'I'm leaving,'" he said in the Senate on Tuesday. The Uruguayan Senate on Tuesday approved a declaration that "requires the Government of Nicaragua to immediately cease violence against the Nicaraguan people." In addition, he expressed "his strong condemnation of all acts of violence and violations of human rights. But these statements did not fall well in some sectors of the Latin American left and generated the reaction of Chavez leader Diosdado Cabello who criticized him on Thursday in a television audition. "Do not you realize Pepe what is happening in Nicaragua at this time? It's the same thing that they did to Venezuela?" Said Cabello.
- Gustavo Petro – In a tweet, former Colombian presidential candidate Gustavo Petro stated that "In Venezuela as in Nicaragua there is no socialism, what there is is the use of left-wing rhetoric of the 20th century to cover up an oligarchy that steals the state, a minority that governs for itself and violates the rights of the majority"
- The Colombian Senator of the Political Group List of the Decency, Gustavo Bolívar, published a trill in which he questions Maduro and Ortega, but also criticizes the situation that Colombia is facing in terms of human rights, especially for the murder of social leaders. "In 100 days of repression, the Ortega dictatorship killed 305 people. In 125 days of protests, the Maduro dictatorship killed 131 people. In Colombia, without dictatorship, they have killed 342 social leaders," said Bolivar.
- US congressmen Ileana Ros-Lehtinen and Mario Díaz Balart met with members of the Nicaraguan community in South Florida to discuss the crisis in that country.
