= Campeones TV =

- Country: Nicaragua
- Headquarters: Managua

Programming
- Language: Spanish

Ownership
- Owner: unknown

History
- Launched: November 27, 2024; 21 months ago
- Replaced: ExtraPlus

Availability

Terrestrial
- Analog UHF: Channel 37

Campeones TV (channel 37) is a Nicaraguan over-the-air sports television channel. It was created following the closure of ExtraPlus in November 2024. Exact information on its owner is unknown, other than its alignment to the other television channels owned by the sons of Daniel Ortega.

== History ==
ExtraPlus shut down without warning on November 15, 2024; whereas on November 27, its frequency began to be occupied by officialist channel Campeones TV. Days after, the former occupier of the UHF frequency received an order to expel all of its staff. In its test mode, the channel aired music videos.

Diego Díaz is an audiovisual editor at the station.

Most of its programming consists of local sporting events, such as baseball, boxing and motorsports. It also airs a TV simulcast of Deportes YA, which is aired on the officialist radio station La Nueva Radio Ya.
