= Timeline of the 2020 Nicaraguan protests =

This is a timeline of the 2020 Nicaraguan protests, covering events from February to December 2020.

== Timeline by month ==
=== February ===
On February 4, 2020, it was reported that the paper and ink of the newspaper La Prensa (which had been held at customs) were released. The newspaper confirmed that, with the assistance of the apostolic nuncio, a communication channel was established with the General Directorate of Customs (DGA) to facilitate the delivery of the retained material.

On February 25, opposition sectors founded the National Coalition at the Hispamer Bookstore auditorium in Managua, despite a police presence outside. Early that morning, the Nicaraguan police blocked all entrances to Managua in anticipation of a demonstration demanding the release of political prisoners. Police confiscated private vehicles and buses at checkpoints, questioning people about their reasons for visiting the capital. Protesters and journalists were attacked by police and groups of Sandinistas.

=== March ===
On March 3, followers of the ruling Sandinista National Liberation Front (FSLN) disrupted the funeral of poet and revolutionary priest Ernesto Cardenal at the Cathedral of Managua. Worshipers reported insults, theft, and aggression, starting while Bishop Rolando Álvarez was speaking and escalating towards the end of the mass. At least one young opponent and four journalists were assaulted, and some journalists having their equipment stolen. Government supporters occupied the benches on the left side and around the church, where they chanted slogans and insults at relatives, friends, and opponents attending the mass. The mass, led by apostolic nuncio Waldemar Stanislaw, was disrupted by Sandinista supporters shouting slogans such as "Support coup d'état, criminals, free country or die! Long live Sandino!" and carrying FSLN flags and handkerchiefs as Cardenal's family tried to remove his coffin from the cathedral after the mass. Unable to leave by the front door, they had to take the coffin out from the side of the cathedral. As the coffin was being transported, government supporters and journalists harassed Gioconda Belli and other attendees. Diplomats and cultural figures witnessed the incidents. Two days later, the Office of Foreign Assets Control (OFAC) of the United States Department of the Treasury sanctioned the Nicaraguan National Police (NNP) and three of its commissioners as "responsible for human rights abuses in Nicaragua".

On March 18, Rosario Murillo confirmed Nicaragua's first case of COVID-19 as a Nicaraguan man who had recently traveled to Panama. Two days later, a second case of COVID-19 was confirmed in a Nicaraguan who had recently traveled to Colombia. Nicaragua took fewer government actions to address the pandemic than its neighbors, allowing major sporting events and the annual Easter celebrations as usual. The country's health minister justified the decision by stressing the need to support the Nicaraguan economy after the recession caused by protests during the two previous years.

=== July ===
According to the Nicaraguan Center for Human Rights (CENIDH), the Nicaraguan Association for Human Rights (ANPDH), witnesses and José Luis Rugama Rizo's family, Rugama Rizo was assassinated when he left his house with a blue-and-white face mask and shouted "Viva Nicaragua libre" to a Sandinista caravan after Ortega's July 19 speech in Estelí, in northern Nicaragua. During his funeral the following day, a house belonging to Rugama Rizo's family was burned; a fundraising campaign began to help the family. On July 21, the Nicaraguan Police identified Abner Onell Pineda Castellon as the main suspect in Rugama Rizo's murder.

Released prisoner and youth leader Bayron Estrada posted on social media that his family continued to be harassed by the Sandinista police. Former political prisoner and professor Juan Bautista Guevara condemned the escalation of harassment by the Nicaraguan police and paramilitaries in his home since his 2019 release under the Amnesty Law to the Permanent Commission on Human Rights (CPDH). According to Guevara, he and his family were subjected to police harassment "every day and at all hours"; people entering and leaving his house were photographed, and guns were pointed at them.

Nicaraguan journalist Gerall Chávez said that an anonymous threat was sent to his relatives in Carazo Department. Radio Corporación journalist and sports reporter Julio "El Porteño" Jarquín criticized police presence outside his home. During the afternoon of July 25, police gathered for hours outside Radio Darío in León; chief of police Fidel Domínguez posted police officers on every corner leading to the station. Social media reported that a group of police officers from the Daniel Ortega and Rosario Murillo administration, commanded by Domínguez, stole a motorcycle and a car belonging to Radio Darío employees. The station, east of the Óscar Danilo Rosales Argüello Hospital, was besieged for more than nine hours before the theft of the motor vehicles was recorded. The Nicaraguan Independent Press forum demanded the cessation of attacks and intimidation of the press by the Ortega Murillo dictatorship throughout the country.

Vice president Rosario Murillo confirmed that the 41st anniversary of the Sandinista revolution would be observed virtually due to "difficulties in these times" (referring to the COVID-19 pandemic), with concerts and other activities. A platform would be placed in Managua to celebrate the anniversary. Opponents of the regime proposed a counter-march for July 19, with blue-and-white flags competing with the red-and-black FSLN flag, commemorating victims of the 2018 anti-government protests.

==== Attacks on the Catholic Church ====
At dawn on July 20, an intoxicated man broke into a van at Managua's Metropolitan Cathedral of the Immaculate Conception of Mary and vandalized it. On July 25, Our Lord of Veracruz Church pastor Pablo Antonio Villafranca Martínez condemned sacrilege and robbery in the El Carmen Chapel. On the church's website, Villafranca Martínez posted: "We will have to replace microphones, cables, amplifiers, speakers, locks, padlocks, piggy banks and repair everything. We have nothing but tears, helplessness, pain and frustration."

On July 29, the Nuestra Señora del Perpetuo Socorro chapel in Nindirí, Masaya was desecrated with "fury and hatred"; unknown vandals stole the chapel's ciborium, broke images, trampled hosts and caused other damage. Jesús Silva, a priest in the Santa Ana parish to which the chapel belongs, reported the incident on social media.

An unidentified man threw a firebomb into a chapel of Managua's Cathedral of the Immaculate Conception on July 31, severely damaging it (including a devotional image of Christ more than three centuries old). The attack was described as an "act of terrorism" by Cardinal Leopoldo Brenes. The incident occurred in the morning, when only two people were in the chapel. According to Rosario Murillo, "a fire" occurred because "our people are very devoted"; there were many candles in the chapel, and a curtain caught fire. Brenes refuted Murillo, saying that "our chapel has no curtains and has no candles". Brenes connected the fire with a July 20 incident in which a man in a van destroyed the cathedral gates and the theft of a fence, allowing the bomber to escape. A woman who worked at the cathedral told a local television station that a young man asked where the chapel was before she heard an explosion and saw the man jump over a church wall.

===== Opposition reaction =====
The Sandinista Renovation Movement (MRS) party condemned the attacks against the Catholic Church, including the burning of the Chapel of the Blood of Christ in the Metropolitan Cathedral of Managua: "We absolutely condemn all terrorist attacks and vandalism against temples and churches, now against the Cathedral of Managua, which constitute a flagrant violation of religious freedom, enshrined in the Nicaraguan Constitution " Superior Council of Private Enterprise (COSEP) president José Adán Aguerri expressed solidarity on Twitter account with the church: "From COSEP Nicaragua and personally, our solidarity and support for the archdiocese of Managua and the Nicaraguan Episcopal Conference [after] the cowardly attack on the Cathedral of Managua that adds to the acts of vandalism in different chapels in the country in previous days. Intolerance will not succeed". The opposition coalition Blue and White National Unity (UNAB) condemned the acts of desecration, siege and harassment against the Catholic Church: "These acts violate freedom of religion provided for in our Constitution. These events, in addition to being targeted attacks, demonstrate the levels of insecurity experienced by the population at the national level ... The evidence shows that the attacks are being committed by people related to the criminal dictatorship of Daniel Ortega, who maintains a permanent political campaign against priests and the Church. We stand in solidarity with the Catholic Church and the devout and Christian people of our country, in the face of such acts of desecration". In a statement, the Nicaraguan Center for Human Rights (CENIDH) repudiated the chapel firebombing: "We demand that the authorities investigate the facts with celerity and find the guilty, [or] we will suppose that it was the Ortega-Murillo regime who gave the order to burn down the chapel to continue its campaign of hatred and terror against churches, religion and believers". member of the Civic Alliance for Justice and Democracy member Juan Sebastian Chamorro condemned the attack on Twitter; Father Edwin Roman also condemned the attack, saying that images could be burned but faith and dignity could not be taken from the people. Auxiliary bishop of Managua Silvio Báez tweeted, "We have cried together because of the fire that has occurred in the chapel of the venerated image of the Blood of Christ." Activist Edipcia Dubón denounced the attack. "I urge your Holiness the Pope to denounce the attacks by Daniel Ortega and his paramilitaries against the Catholic Church, the bishops and priests and the terrorist acts against the Cathedral of Managua," demanded Bianca Jagger. The Evangelical Alliance of Nicaragua also condemned the attack.

Ortega avoided mentioning the attack when he commemorated the 41st anniversary of the Nicaraguan Army Air Force. Nine hours after the firebombing, the Nicaraguan National Police issued a statement suggesting that an "alcohol spray" could have caused the fire; a plastic spray bottle in good condition (unaffected by fire) was found at the scene.

===== International reaction =====
The Panamanian Episcopal Conference rejected the July 31 act of "vandalism" in the Metropolitan Cathedral of Managua, when a man threw an explosive device which caused its chapel to catch fire. "It causes us deep pain and outrage, seeing how the sensitivity of the Nicaraguan people to such destruction caused by a bomb that burned the chapel of the Metropolitan Cathedral of Managua has been wounded", the conference said in a statement. United States Ambassador to Nicaragua Kevin K. Sullivan "condemned the attack" as "one of the series of deplorable attacks on Catholic temples in different parts" of the country. In a statement, the Latin American Episcopal Council (CELAM) condemned the events in Managua: "We condemn this and any act of sacrilege or desecration that threatens the spiritual life of the faithful and the evangelizing work of the Church, especially in these difficult times of pandemic that we have to live".

The United Nations Human Rights Office (OHCHR) tweeted its solidarity with the Catholic community, calling for a full investigation. The Episcopal Conference of Costa Rica issued a statement calling the incident a "cowardly attack" which "has resulted in the desecration of the sacred species contained in the Tabernacle, as well as the desecration of the venerated image of the Blood of Christ, so loved by the Catholic faithful in [our] sister Republic of Nicaragua ... We consider this criminal act a frontal attack on the Church in Nicaragua and on religious freedom in this beloved nation". Spanish media, journalists, theologians, religious orders and the Spanish Episcopal Conference also condemned the violent actions against the Nicaraguan Catholic Church.

=== August ===
The Sandinista regime continued to intimidate independent media. Members of the Nicaraguan Police deployed patrols and riot-police units throughout Managua on the morning of August 1, including near La Prensa. Radio La Costeñisima in Bluefields was also harassed, beginning at 8:30 am.

The Inter American Press Association (IAPA) condemned the "authoritarian regime"'s aggression and intimidation of journalists, which it said had worsened during coverage of the pandemic, and called on regional governments to exert "more pressure". Faced with allegations of crimes against press freedom made by journalistic organizations, IAPA president Christopher Barnes and Committee on Freedom of the Press and Information president Roberto Rock condemned "the new wave of censorship and attacks" and targeted "public officials, police officers and members of parastate groups motivated by the government of Daniel Ortega".

Michael Kozak, acting assistant secretary for the U.S. Department of State's Bureau of Western Hemisphere Affairs, condemned the attacks and press intimidation in Nicaragua. On August 2, Pope Francis condemned the July 31 attack and expressed solidarity with the Nicaraguan Christians.

A person burst into Church of Santa Rosa de Lima in Santa Rosa del Peñón, León Department during mass and threw stones at a glass urn, returning to throw another stone at a statue of Christ on the altar. The Inmaculada Concepción de María parish confirmed that an Ortega opponent was killed in a beating. Custodian Noel Hernández, 24, died after 48 hours in critical condition after being beaten by unknown assailants in La Concepción, Masaya Department.

=== September ===
The Valle family's television channel 12 confirmed that it had been fined C$21 million. Carolina Valle reported that on September 11, Judge Luden Marti Quiros García appeared at the station to "carry out an embargo for 21 million cordobas at the request of the Directorate General of Income (DGI)". Valle said that the seizure request before the judge was made by financial assistant attorney Marlen Isabel Ramiíez Laguna, who imposed an "arbitrary and illegal objection to our income tax returns for the years 2011, 2012 and 2012-2013".

Anibal Toruño, director of Radio Darío in León, condemned on Twitter account the harassment and intimidation of the radio station by National Police of Nicaragua officials.

=== October ===
Members of the National Coalition were stoned in Masaya, where Verónica Chávez (wife of journalist Miguel Mora) was seriously injured. The attackers, supporters of President Daniel Ortega, were enabled by the National Police.The UN condemned the attack.

The Nicaraguan Center for Human Rights warned that the law on foreign agents approved by parliament gives Ortega "totalitarian control", and asked the international community for "urgent action" to reject it. The National Assembly of Nicaragua, with a pro-government majority, approved a law regulating foreign agents. International media and correspondents, cooperating agencies, humanitarian organizations and accredited religious entities were exempted from the law.

Opponents of the Ortega regime denounced harassment, attacks and threats by supporters and members of Sandinismo. The National Coalition denounced the stationing of dozens of anti-riot agents outside a Managua hotel where they were meeting about the 2021 general elections, and exiled journalist Maryórit Guevara said that unidentified people marked his home with a phrase he interpreted "as a death threat".

According to a Central Bank of Nicaragua (BCN) report, the country lost 217,930 jobs in an economic contraction since 2018 (when civic rebellion against the Daniel Ortega regime began). Until August 2020, Nicaragua had 695,867 workers affiliated with the Nicaraguan Social Security Institute (INSS) – 3.7 percent less than the previous year.

=== December ===
Activist Félix Maradiaga said that during a struggle with the Nicaraguan National Police which prevented him from leaving a house, he had a finger broken and two others dislocated. Maradiaga, a political scientist in the opposition Blue and White National Unit (UNAB), wanted to travel to Bilwi (capital of the North Caribbean Coast Autonomous Region) with a shipment of humanitarian aid for people affected by Hurricanes Eta and Iota.

On December 21, the Sandinista-dominated National Assembly approved a law barring the opposition from the 2021 elections; the United States announced new sanctions against three government officials. In an extraordinary session, 70 Sandinista legislators approved the law. Fourteen members of the Constitutionalist Liberal Party (PLC) voted against it, calling it unconstitutional. The law prevents those whom the government considers "coup plotters" or "terrorists" from running for elected office, despite the fact that the constitution guarantees the right to political participation to all citizens.

Two years after the occupation of the Confidencial newsroom, the 100% Noticias channel, the Nicaraguan Center for Human Rights (CENIDH), the Institute for Development and Democracy (Ipade), the Center for Information and Advisory Services in Salud (Cisas) and the Popol Na Foundation, the Ortega-Murillo regime posted signs on the buildings saying that they "belong to the Ministry of Health" without a prior court order. The Superior Council for Private Enterprise (COSEP) denounced the "de facto confiscation" by the state of two media critical of Ortega and of nine outlawed NGOs, accusing the government of "taking political decisions that violate the rights and constitutional guarantees of Nicaraguans" and cause "legal insecurity and economic and social instability in the country." According to EFE, the government transferred buildings belonging to the 100% Noticias television channel, the digital magazines Confidencial and Niú, the television programs "Esta Semana" and "Esta Noche", and nine NGOs to the Ministry of Health.

== See also ==
- Timeline of the 2018 Nicaraguan protests
