= INSS =

INSS may refer to:

- Instituto Nacional do Seguro Social, Brazilian government agency
- Institute for National Security Studies (Israel), Israeli research institute and think tank
- Institute for National Strategic Studies, part of the National Defense University (United States)
- Nicaraguan Social Security Institute, Nicaraguan government agency
