= Ana Quirós =

Costa Rican feminist and activist

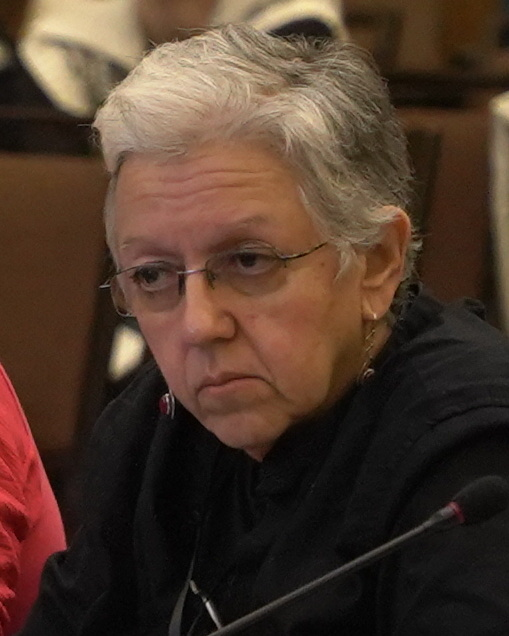
- Born: Costa Rica
- Occupation(s): Feminist, LGBT rights activist

Ana Quirós Víquez is a Costa Rican feminist and LGBT+ rights activist who worked in Nicaragua. She is the director of the non-governmental organization Centro de Información y Servicios de Asesoría en Salud (CISAS).

== Biography ==
Ana Quirós was born in Costa Rica. Since the late 1980s she had lived in Nicaragua, where she developed her activism. In 1997, she obtained Nicaraguan citizenship. She is part of the Movimiento Autónomo de Mujeres (MAM), the Articulación Feminista de Nicaragua, the Unidad Nicaraguan de la Disidencia Sexual Auto Convocada (Nicaraguan Unity of Self-Convened Sexual Dissidence) and represents the Unidad Azul y Blanco (Blue and White Unity) (UNAB) in Costa Rica. She is also an expert in public health.

In April 2018, during protests in Nicaragua against the social security reform by the government of President Daniel Ortega, Quirós was beaten by supporters of Vice President Rosario Murillo with metal pipes. She subsequently had to receive medical assistance for head injuries and two fractured and displaced fingers.

At the end of 2018, Quirós was arrested and deported to Costa Rica, while the Nicaraguan government revoked her Nicaraguan citizenship.
