= Trees of Life =

Public art installation in Managua, Nicaragua

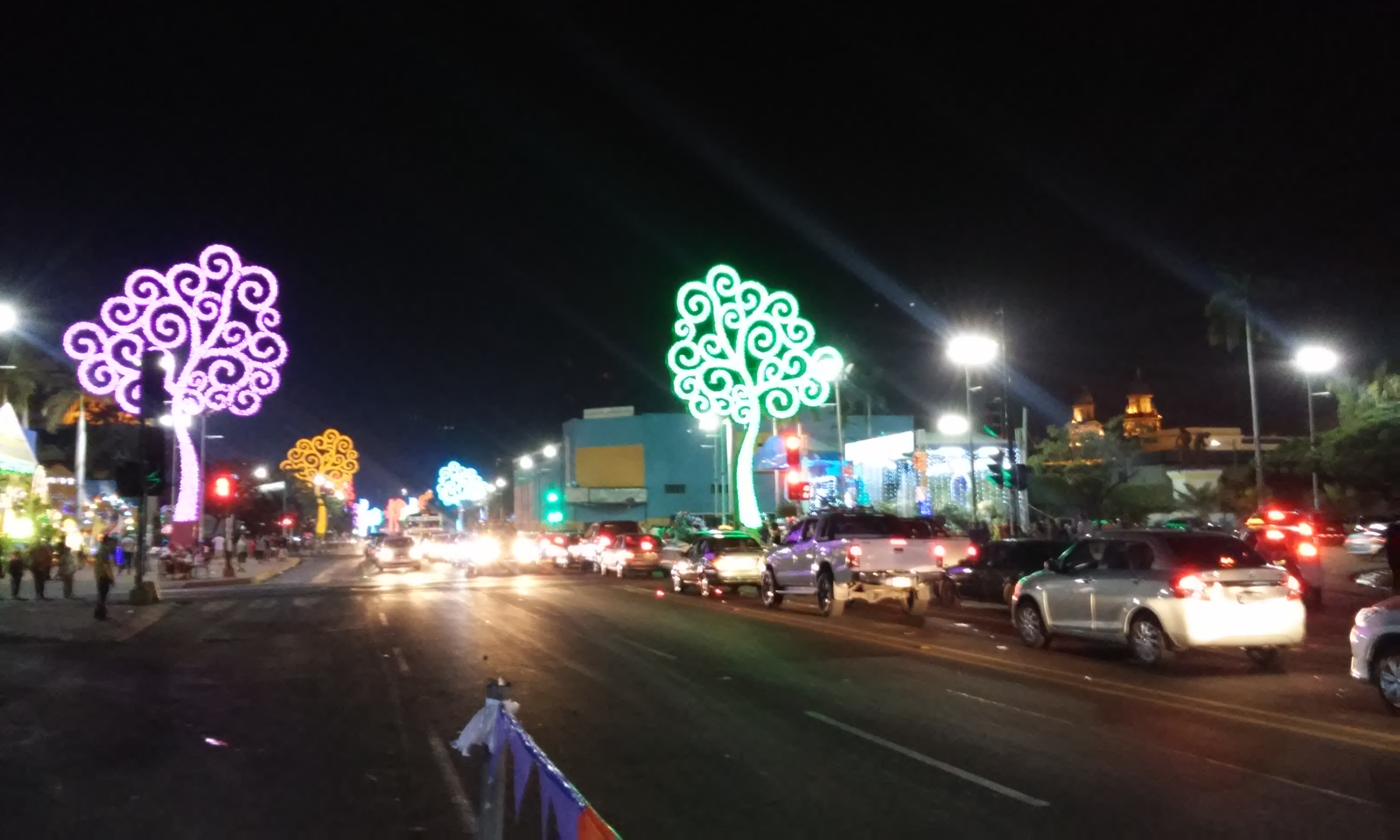
Trees of Life illuminated at night on Avenida Bolívar, Managua, 2016

The Trees of Life (Spanish: Árboles de la Vida) are a public art installation in Managua, Nicaragua. Begun in 2013 to honor the 34th anniversary of the Sandinista Revolution, the Trees of Life are a city beautification project of First Lady Rosario Murillo, who has also served as Nicaragua's Vice President since 2017.

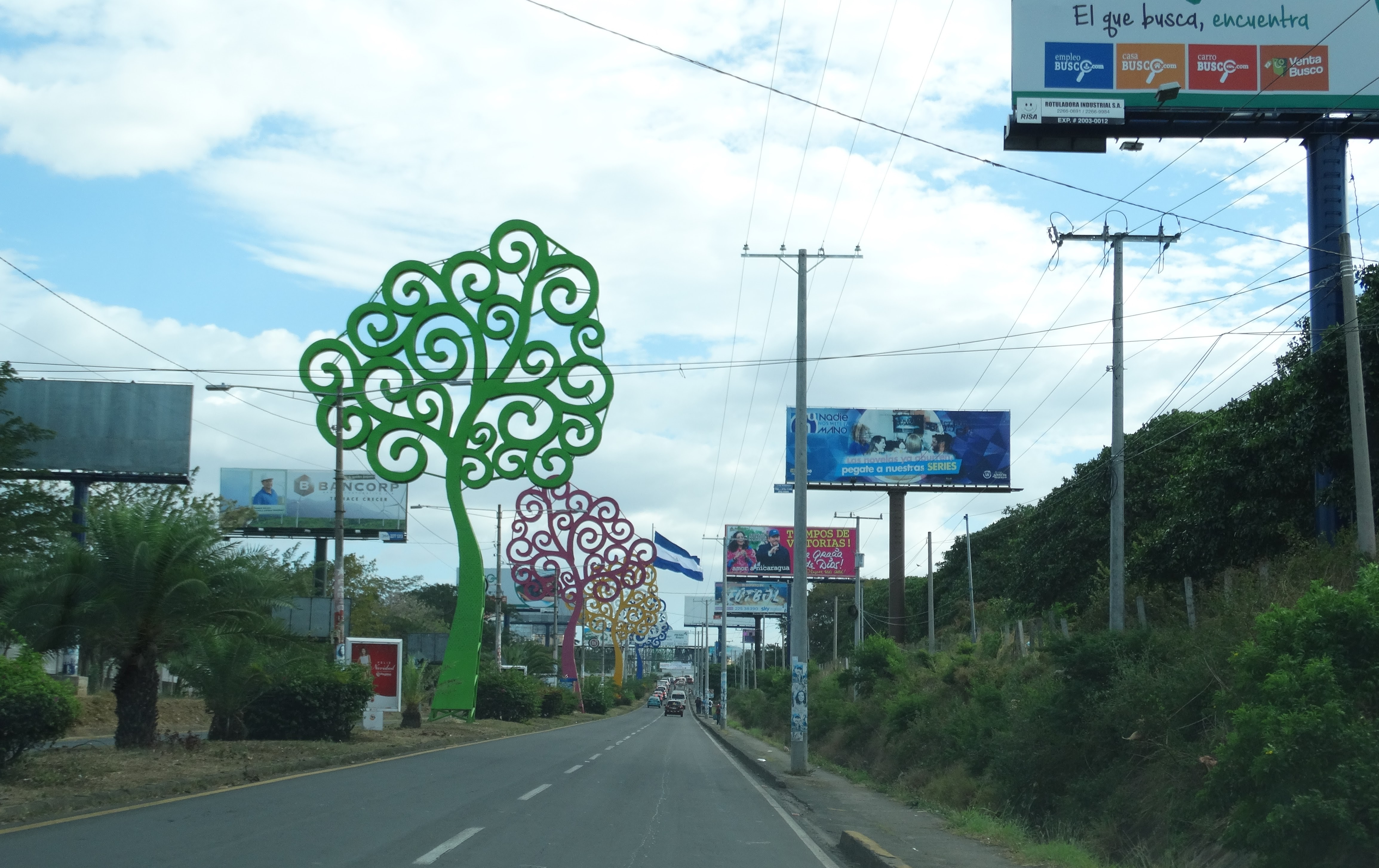
Trees of Life in daylight, Managua, 2017

The approximately 140 abstract, brightly colored tree sculptures were reportedly inspired by the 1909 work by Austrian painter Gustav Klimt called The Tree of Life, Stoclet Frieze. They are made of metal and decorated by 2.5 million tiny light bulbs in total. Standing 42 to 56 feet tall, they cost a reported $20,000 to $25,000 (USD) apiece and in total $1 million to light annually.

The Trees often line streets and parks in Managua and sometimes accompany other statues, including the illuminated statue of Hugo Chávez in Managua's Hugo Chávez Roundabout, which cost $1.1 million to construct, and the statue of Nicaraguan revolutionary (and Murillo's great-uncle) Augusto Sandino on the stage of Managua's outdoor concert venue, the Acoustic Shell.

Commentary on the visual style of the installation has been mixed. One observer compared them to the lavish Catholic cathedrals constructed in the colonial period, saying "these vibrant public artworks have drastically brightened the streets of Managua — and in a relatively short time." However other viewers have called them "garish".

In the 2018 protests, demonstrators toppled, and in some cases set on fire, a number of the Trees, a gesture widely interpreted as a rebuke to the administration and Murillo specifically.
