= La Nueva Radio Ya =

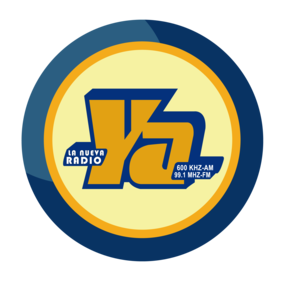
- Managua; Nicaragua
- Frequencies: 99.1 FM, 600 AM

Programming
- Language: Spanish

History
- First air date: 1990

Links
- Website: nuevaya.com.ni

La Nueva Radio Ya is a Nicaraguan government-aligned radio station.

== History and management ==
The station was originally founded as Radio Ya in April 1990 as a pro-Sandinista National Liberation Front (FSLN) radio under the direction of Carlos José Guadamuz. It was considered the successor of the state radio station La Voz de Nicaragua. After Guadamuz broke with the FSLN, in 1999 Radio Ya was taken over and fell under the influence of the party, specifically Daniel Ortega's son Rafael Ortega. As of 2020, it is owned by Entretenimiento Digital SA, a company controlled by Rafael Ortega.

During the 2018 Nicaraguan protests, anti-government protesters set the station's building on fire.

== Content ==
La Nueva Radio Ya's editorial line is pro-government, with content often described as propaganda. State Media Monitor in 2026 classified the station as state-controlled, describing it as an FSLN "mouthpiece" with no editorial independence.

The station has one of the highest radio audiences in Nicaragua, and includes political, news, sport, music and entertainment programming.
