= RENACER Act =

US legislative bill

Reinforcing Nicaragua's Adherence to Conditions for Electoral Reform Act of 2021
- Other short titles: RENACER Act
- Long title: To advance the strategic alignment of United States diplomatic tools toward the realization of free, fair, and transparent elections in Nicaragua and to reaffirm the commitment of the United States to protect the fundamental freedoms and human rights of the people of Nicaragua, and for other purposes.
- Acronyms (colloquial): RENACER
- Enacted by: the 117th United States Congress
- Effective: November 10, 2021

Citations
- Public law: Pub. L. 117–54 (text) (PDF)
- Statutes at Large: 135 Stat. 413

Legislative history
- Introduced in the Senate as S. 1064 by Bob Menendez (D-NJ) on March 25, 2021; Committee consideration by Senate Foreign Relations; Passed the Senate on November 1, 2021 (Unanimous Consent); Passed the House on November 3, 2021 (387-35); Signed into law by President Joe Biden on November 10, 2021

Reinforcing Nicaragua's Adherence to Conditions for Electoral Reform Act of 2021, known as the RENACER Act for short, is a bill that extended United States sanctions against Nicaragua and that granted the President several measures to address acts of corruption and human rights violations by the Daniel Ortega administration, including the power to exclude Nicaragua from the Dominican Republic-Central America Free Trade Agreement (CAFTA-DR) and to obstruct multilateral loans to the country. The bill was signed into law by President Joe Biden in November 2021.

== See also ==
- NICA Act
