= Holy See–Nicaragua relations =

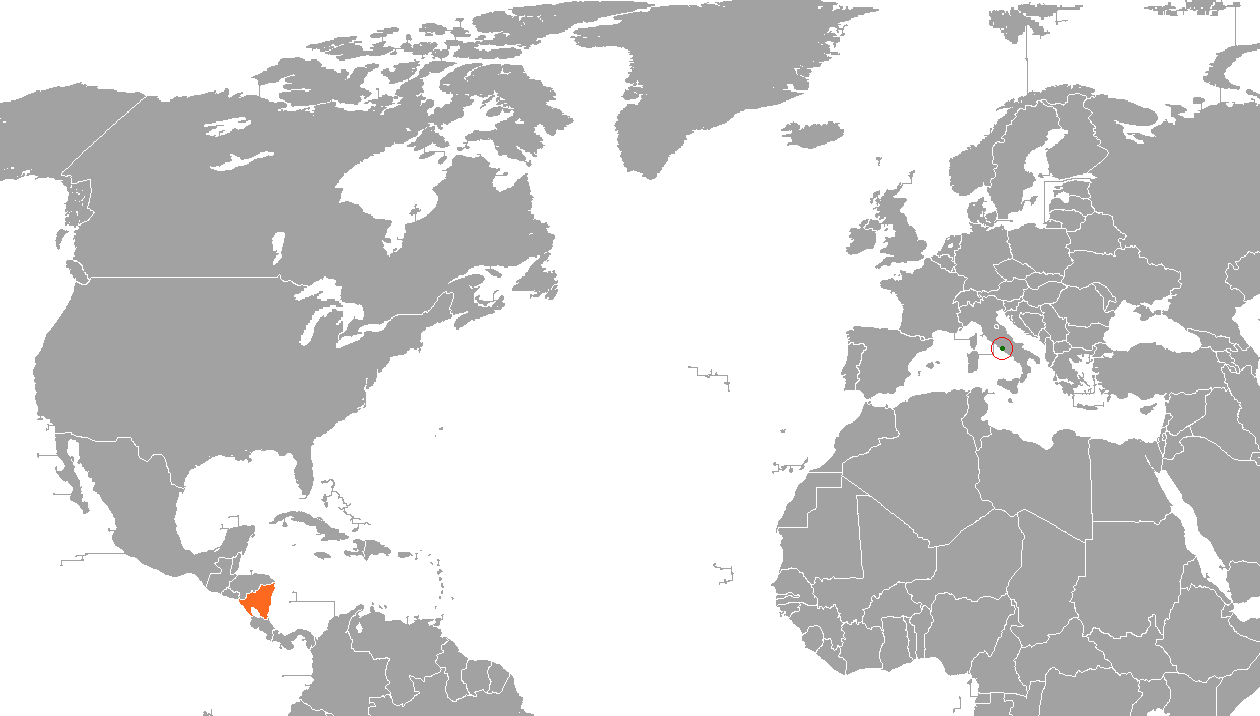

- Holy See: Nicaragua

The Holy See and Nicaragua have a long history of close church–state cooperation.

== Church's relationship with the Conservatives ==
After 1823 the Liberals gained power by violently repressing the Conservatives, however, the Church continued its alliance with the Conservatives. Throughout the 1840s and 1850s, the Liberals and Conservatives vied for ultimate power over the state; the Conservatives consolidated their power in 1856. During the whole power struggle the Church maintained warm relations with the Conservatives, in return, in 1862 the Concordato was signed by the Conservative government and the Vatican. The Concrodato gave the government the right to nominate Church officials; but in return, the State was to financially support the Catholic Church.

== Relations with José Santos Zelaya ==
In the 1893 election, the Conservatives lost to the Liberals and a new leader came to power: José Santos Zelaya. Zelaya instituted a new constitution which called for the separation of the Church and state and the nationalization of Church property, in addition to the termination of the concordato, secular education, and civil marriages. In 1909 Zeyala was forced out of power and the Conservatives re-consolidated their power and instituted a new constitution in 1912 which reaffirmed Church privileges. In the mid-1920s a revolutionary, Augusto César Sandino, tried sweeping Nicaragua with Bolshevik ideals. The Church was opposed to Sandino because of his ties with the Mexican government of 1926–29, which partook in Anti-clericalism.

== Relations with Anastasio Somoza García ==
When liberal leader Anastasio Somoza García took power in 1936, the Church abandoned its loyalties to the Conservatives and became dedicated to the Somoza regime. Their new loyalties stemmed from the fact that Somoza stated himself as an anti-Marxist and did not continue the persecution of the Church as liberals before he had, but also, that Somoza was responsible for Sandino's death. A new constitution was born under the Somoza regime in 1950; it was a negotiation between previous anticlerical measures and traditional church privileges.

The Catholic Church was recognized as the official religion, and despite the legal separation of church and state, church-run schools continued to flourish. After the first Somoza, there were 2 more successors in the Somoza regime which kept this family in power for over 40 years. Throughout this time, the Somozas and the Church remained in good relations. The Somozas controlled and promoted the Church as long as the Church was not critical of its state; by supporting the Church, the Somozas gained popularity among the people of Nicaragua.

== Position of the Church in the 1960s and 1970s ==
It was not until the late 1970s that the Church began to divide its loyalties away from the Somozas; it was at this time that they started to recognize the repression and human rights abuses that were not concurrent with the Bible. The Church could no longer support this government, but they were still in favor of the state's ideologies of hierarchies and capitalist systems; this caused a divide within the clergy. Eventually, the Church became united in its opposition toward Somoza; the problem was that the Church was not able to decide where to make their next alliance.

The Second Vatican Council encouraged Catholics to involve themselves more deeply in social justice issues, the Church worked as activists against the Somoza repression and for more social services. The Church fought for water and for getting a cemetery, but this was repressed by the government, and as such, the church was repressed too.

== Period of Sandinista rule ==
The ideology of the revolution was deep-set in Marxist values that were against religion. The structure of the Catholic Church was very religious; as such, they were rightfully threatened by the revolution.

During the period of Sandinista rule (1979–1990), the Nicaraguan Catholic Church was divided between the pro-Sandinista "popular church" of which they were a patron and the anti-Sandinista hierarchy. The Church was united in its opposition toward the corruption of the Somoza dynasty, but the clergy's opinions about the Sandinistas diverged once they took power.

== Relations with Daniel Ortega ==
Daniel Ortega once favored abortion rights but changed his stance in the 1990s after improving his ties with the Catholic Church. Enrique Bolanos signed a new ban on all abortions, including cases where the pregnancy threatens the woman's life, in the presence of Catholic bishops and Protestant evangelist leaders.

In 2023, the Vatican closed its embassy in Nicaragua due to Ortega's government proposing to suspend relations.
