= Nicaragua Investment Conditionality Act =

US legislative bill

The Nicaragua Investment Conditionality Act, also known as NICA Act, is a bill that, as a response to the alleged election fraud committed by Nicaraguan president Daniel Ortega during the 2016 election, prevented Nicaragua from taking additional loans until it was willing to "[take] effective steps to hold free, fair and transparent elections."

== Procedural history ==
In 2016, the bill was passed by the United States House of Representatives but not the Senate and was reintroduced to the House of Representatives during a new session in 2017. The Nicaraguan Government opposed this bill, with Nicaraguan Vice President and First Lady Rosario Murillo calling it a “reactionary and interventionist" action that would “undermine the right of Nicaragua to continue developing the socialist model.”. All ALBA member states are opposed to the bill. An international group of notable trade unionists has also voiced their opposition to the bill by signing a solidarity statement in support of the Government of Nicaragua: Rosa Pavanelli of Public Services International; Joe O'Flynn of SIPTU; Owen Tudor of Trades Union Congress; Tim Roache of Britain's General Union; Kevin Courtney of National Union of Teachers; Mick Cash of National Union of Rail, Maritime and Transport Workers; Dave Prentis of UNISON. Human Rights Watch supported the legislation, calling it “a powerful tool to press the Ortega-Murillo government to end its pattern of abuse against opponents”.

On December 20, 2018, U.S. President Donald Trump signed the NICA Act into law after it was unanimously approved by Congress. This enactment came eight months after the beginning of the 2018–2020 Nicaraguan protests.

== See also ==
- RENACER Act
