= El 19 =

Nicaraguan newspaper

El 19digital
- Website type: News
- Revenue: Subscription, Advertisement
- Website: El19digital
- Launched: August 18, 2008; 18 years ago
- Current status: Online

El 19 digital is a Nicaraguan newspaper, with close political ties to the Frente Sandinista de Liberación Nacional. The first printed edition circulated in the capital city of Managua on August 21, 2008, a couple of months before the 2008 municipal elections.

The last printed weekly edition of the newspaper (No.16) was released in November 2008, and was dedicated to the Sandinista victory in the elections. El 19 digital reappeared later as a short TV news program on the Telenica 8 channel and as a daily digital newspaper.

On July 20, 2019, the site www.el19digital.com ranked thirteenth in Nicaragua.
