= Sandinista Youth =

Youth wing of the Nicaraguan FSLN party

- Juventud Sandinista or Juventud Sandinista 19 de Julio
- Logo of the Sandinista Youth (since 2011)
- Abbreviation: JS
- Formation: 1979 (47 years)
- Type: Youth organisation
- Headquarters: Managua, Nicaragua
- Region served: Nicaragua
- Coordinator: Milton Ruiz
- Parent organization: Sandinista National Liberation Front
- Affiliations: World Federation of Democratic Youth
- Website: Juventud Presidente

The Sandinista Youth (Spanish: Juventud Sandinista or Juventud Sandinista 19 de Julio) is the youth organization of the Sandinista National Liberation Front (FSLN) party in Nicaragua. The Sandinista Youth arose informally during the Nicaraguan Revolution and it was formally founded by Gonzalo Carrión after the FSLN victory on July 19, 1979.

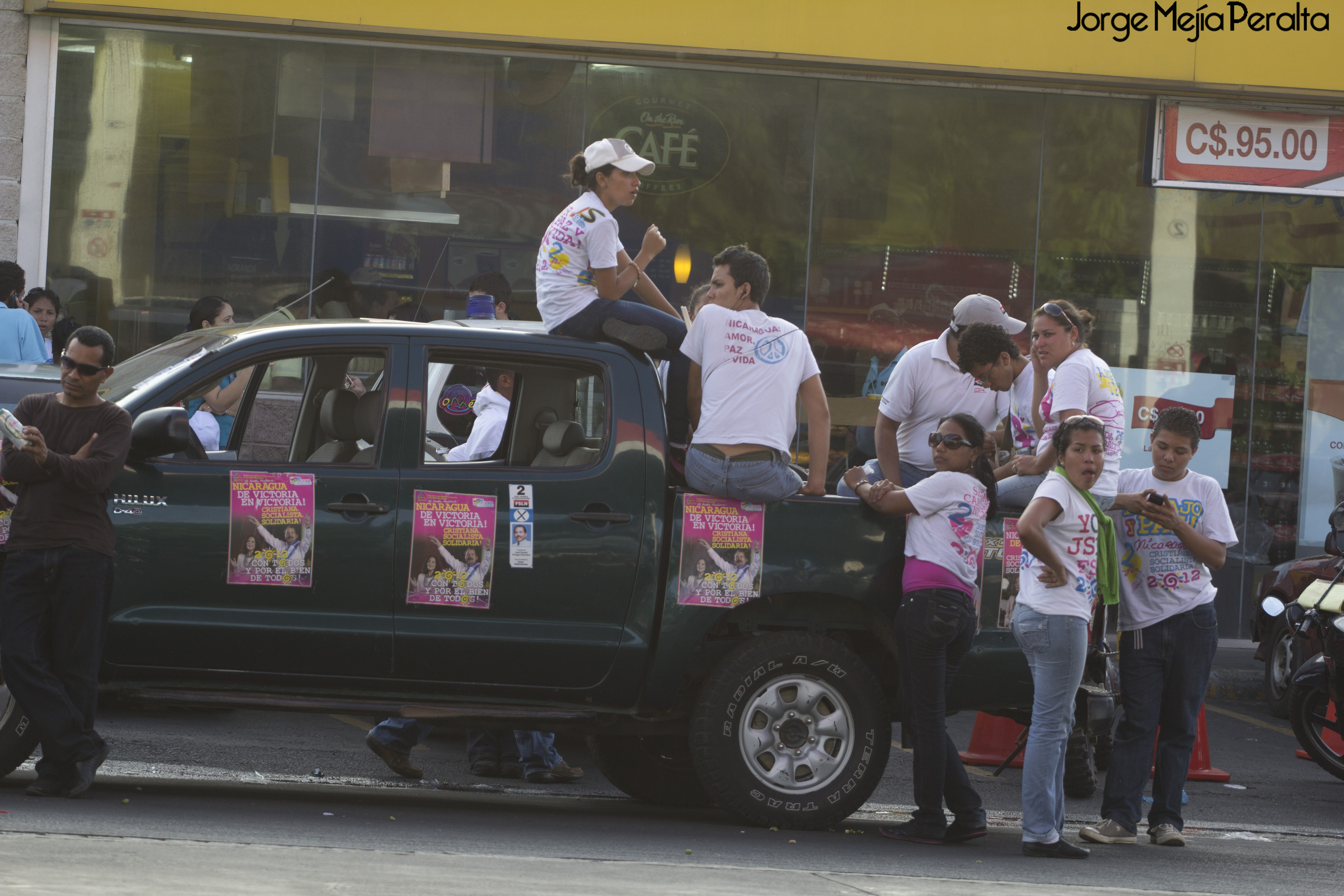
Members - or militants (as they call themselves) - of the Sandinista Youth

Since 2011 the organization has been part of umbrella organization Juventud Presidente, which unites several youth organizations that support Nicaraguan President and Sandinista revolutionary commandante Daniel Ortega.

Although they publicly claim to be a peaceful political youth organization, its members—or militants (as they refer to themselves)--have been associated with Sandinista mobs, parapolice or paramilitary groups to suppress opposition during the times in political power.

== See also ==
- Sandinista Revolution
