= Nicaraguan Social Security Institute =

The Nicaraguan Social Security Institute (Instituto Nicaragüense de Seguridad Social, or INSS) oversees the Nicaraguan social security system. It was legally established in 1956 and first implemented in 1957.

The social security system provided pension, disability and healthcare benefits to members. The system is funded by employer and employee contributions, amounting to about 5% of GDP in 2016. As of 2017 only about 32% of the work force were members largely due to high levels of informal employment. Pensions become payable at 60 years of age, or 55 for miners and teachers, subject to 750 weeks (about 15 years) of contributions.

In 2006, President Enrique Bolaños released an actuarial study conducted by an Inter-institutional Technical Commission (Comisión Técnica Interinstitucional, or CTI) that anticipated coming deficits in spite of the program's solvency at the time (in 2007, income exceeded expenses). Subsequent studies by the INSS also suggested the program would face deficits beginning around 2014, and reach insolvency sometime after 2019.

The program remained solvent in the period from 2007 to 2011, under President Daniel Ortega, despite the 2008 financial crisis. However, by 2016, the program operated at a loss for the fourth consecutive year.

In early 2018, the International Monetary Fund pushed for Nicaragua to raise the retirement age, from 60 to 65, to address the program's anticipated losses in future years.

In April 2018, the Ortega administration announced reforms to the program, imposed by decree, that cut benefits by 5% while raising income and payroll taxes, sparking deadly unrest in reaction to the substance of the reforms as well as their unilateral imposition. After five days of clashes between protestors and police, Ortega announced the reforms had been cancelled.
