= List of lakes of Nicaragua =

This article contains a sortable table listing all lakes and lagoons of Nicaragua. The table includes all still water bodies, natural or artificial, regardless of water volume or maximum depth.

Ranking	Nombre	Superficie (km²)	Departamento (s)
1	Lake Nicaragua (Cocibolca)	8,138.10	Granada; Rivas; Río San Juan; Chontales
2	Lake Managua (Xolotlan)	1,052.90	Managua; León
3	Perlas Lagoon	505.64	RACCS
4	Bahía de Bluefields	172.73	RACCS
5	Bismuna Lagoon (Wani)	131.68	RACCN
6	Wouhnta Lagoon	93.83	RACCN
7	Pahra Lagoon	91.97	RACCN
8	Lake Apanás	45.90	Jinotega
9	Top Lock Lagoon	31.63	RACCS
10	Karatá Lagoon	29.75	RACCN
11	Sonie Lagoon	26.09	RACCS
12	Apoyo Lagoon	19.44	Granada; Masaya
13	Tisma Lagoon	14.11	Granada
14	Dakura Lagoon	11.75	RACCN
15	Masaya Lagoon	8.54	Masaya
16	Cabo viejo Lagoon	7.63	RACCN
17	Ñocrime Lagoon	5.60	Rivas
18	Moyuá Lagoon	5.08	Matagalpa
19	Xiloá Lagoon	3.79	Managua
20	Sikapakia Lagoon	2.88	RACCN
21	Leimus Lagoon	2.82	RACCN
22	Apoyeque Lagoon	1.93	Managua
23	Cosigüina Lagoon	1.25	Chinandega
24	Monte Galán Lagoon	0.76	León
25	Asososca Lagoon	0.69	Managua
26	Mombacho Lagoon	0.30	Granada
27	Maderas Lagoon	0.22	Rivas
28	Nejapa Lagoon	0.19	Managua
29	Tiscapa Lagoon	0.13	Managua

== See also ==
- Lake Nicaragua
- Lake Managua
