= Old Cathedral of Managua =

Cathedral in Managua, Nicaragua

Coordinates: 12°09′22″N 86°16′16″W

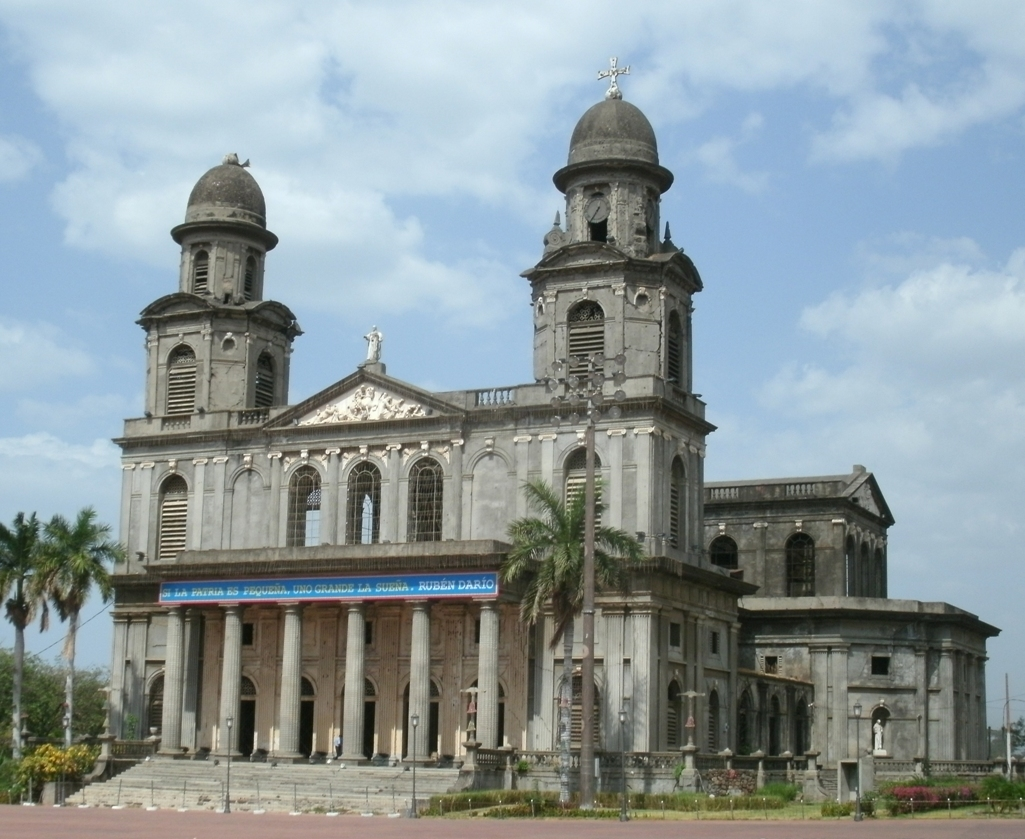
The Old Cathedral of Managua

The Old Cathedral of Managua, known as the Catedral de Santiago (St. James' Cathedral) in Spanish, is a cathedral in Managua, Nicaragua.

The Cathedral was designed by Belgian architects. Its neoclassical design was said to have been inspired by the look of the church of Saint-Sulpice in Paris, France. Construction began in 1928 and lasted until 1938. Belgian engineer Pablo Dambach oversaw the construction of the cathedral. The iron that was used to frame the core of the cathedral was shipped directly from Belgium.

The cathedral survived the 1931 Nicaragua earthquake, as only its iron core had been erected at the time. Four decades later, the cathedral was heavily damaged during the 1972 Nicaragua earthquake, and the building was subsequently condemned though it was not demolished. The closing of the cathedral eventually led to the construction of the Metropolitan Cathedral of the Immaculate Conception of Mary, also known as the New Cathedral of Managua, which was completed in 1993. Since that time, the restoration of the Old Cathedral has appeared to be possible.

The Old Cathedral's tower clock, which was damaged during the Contra Civil War of the 1980s, was later removed during renovations to the cathedral in the late 1990s. The clock is now housed at the National Palace of Culture.
