= Edificio Benjamín Zeledón =

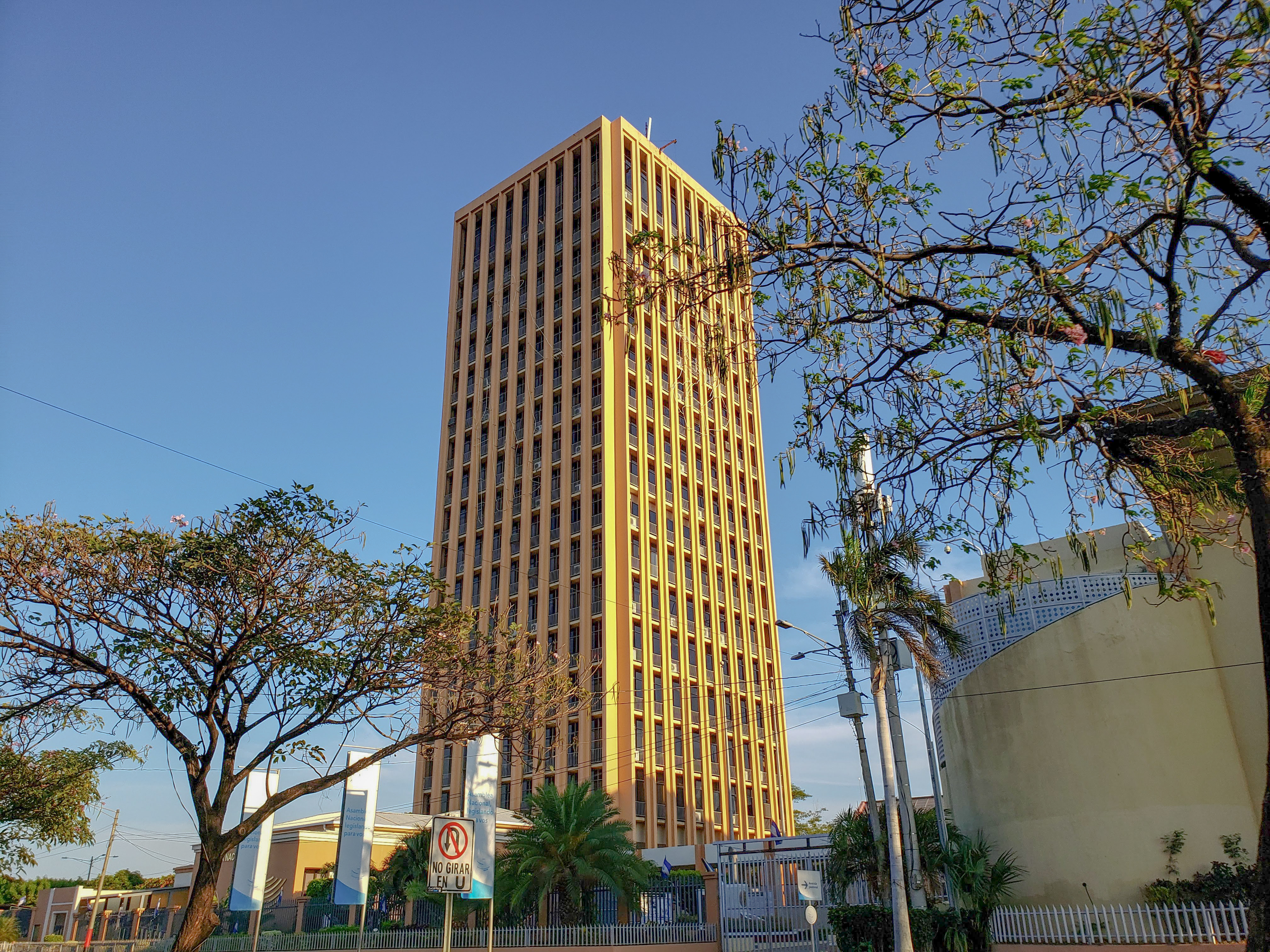
- Edificio Benjamín Zeledón
- Interactive map of the Edificio Benjamín Zeledón area

General information
- Status: Completed
- Type: business and office space
- Location: Managua, Nicaragua
- Coordinates: 12°09′01″N 86°16′21″W
- Construction started: 1968
- Completed: 1970

Height
- Roof: 70 m (230 ft)

Technical details
- Floor count: 18

Design and construction
- Architect: Edward Durell Stone

Edificio Benjamín Zeledón (Benjamín Zeledón Building), is one of tallest buildings in Managua, capital of Nicaragua. It survived the earthquake of 23 December 1972.

== 1972 Managua earthquake ==
The 6.2 magnitude earthquake of 23 December 1972, at 12:35 a.m. on the Richter scale, and its two aftershocks at 1:18 a.m. and 1:20 a.m. that same day, which devastated downtown Managua, caused the bank no major damage other than the detachment of some windows, shattered glass, and the fall of some marble slabs in the lobby and first basement. The bank also suffered a fire in the upper floor, between the 14th and 17th floors (rooftop), which was brought under control, as evidenced by the photos taken a week after the disaster by scientists from the University of California. From then on, it gained worldwide prestige for its earthquake resistance. Moving with the rhythm of the earthquake, it was like a sledgehammer against the foundations of the neighboring Casa Mántica building (adjacent to its north side), which was demolished in 1973. Later, it was discovered that near the Bank of America there is a seismic fault named the Los Bancos fault, because it passes beneath the Central Bank (which had 12 of its 16 floors demolished in 1975) and the National Bank of Nicaragua (current headquarters of the National Assembly of Nicaragua since 1985) near the northwest corner of the 1st basement. Repairs were made and it was repainted white.

== Remodelling ==
Recently, in October 2003, there was a fire in the first basement, and at the end of 2007, the gates surrounding the Bank of America, which had been installed in the 1980s on all four sides at the lobby, were removed. In May 2008, the Board of Directors of the National Assembly decided to paint and remodel it; through a competition, Sherwin-Williams paints were chosen to paint it gold inside and out, and to remodel it by replacing the water pipes, glass, marble, electrical system, light fixtures, etc. The National Assembly of Nicaragua recently renamed the building after the national hero Benjamín Zeledón.
