= Neil Armstrong Observatory =

Astronomical observatory in Nicaragua

Coordinates: 12°05′27″N 86°13′22″W

The Neil Armstrong Observatory was completed March 1, 2014, making Nicaragua the only country in Latin America with an astronomical observatory reserved for use by scholars. The observatory, which cost half a million U.S. dollars to build, is located at the Pierre and Marie Curie School in Managua. The building consists of two floors plus a dome of more than 4.5 square meters. The telescope's main lens is 11 inches across and can magnify stellar objects by 50 to 800 times. The first floor is a chemistry lab named for Irene Joliot-Curie. The second floor, dedicated to the study of physics, is named for Isaac Newton. The observatory is named Neil Armstrong in honor of the first man to touch the Moon, during the Apollo 11 mission in 1969.
