= Tiscapa Lagoon Natural Reserve =

Lagoon in Managua, Nicaragua

Coordinates: 12°08′22.4″N 86°16′13.9″W

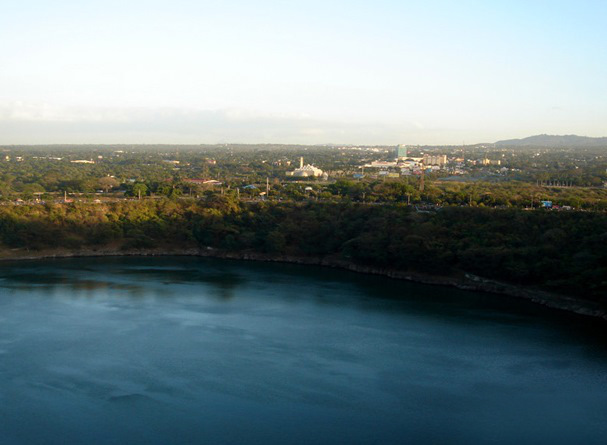
- Vista of Tiscapa Lagoon and the new Managua center.
- Interactive map of Tiscapa Lagoon Natural Reserve
- Location: Managua Department
- Nearest city: Managua
- Area: 98 acres (0.4 km^{2})
- Established: 1991
- Governing body: Ministry of the Environment and Natural Resources (MARENA)

Tiscapa Lagoon is a lagoon of volcanic origin that formed over 10,000 years ago. It is located in the capital city of Managua in Nicaragua, and covers an area of 0.13 km^{2}. Tiscapa Lagoon was protected as a natural reserve (Spanish: Reserva Natural Laguna de Tiscapa) on October 31, 1991. The reserve is managed by the Ministry of the Environment and Natural Resources (MARENA) and comprises one of the 78 protected areas of Nicaragua.

The reserve is located within city limits of the capital, Managua, and is a popular tourist attraction. Restaurants and stores line the walls of the lagoon, while canopy rides provide a panoramic view of the old downtown where only a few buildings survived the 1972 earthquake that destroyed 90 percent of the capital city. Of course, many new buildings and shopping malls have been built since then. Many pre-Columbian artifacts have been found in and around lagoon and reserve. The lagoon has its unique ecosystem with its own characteristic flora and fauna and height.

== See also ==
- Tourism in Nicaragua
