= List of universities in Nicaragua =

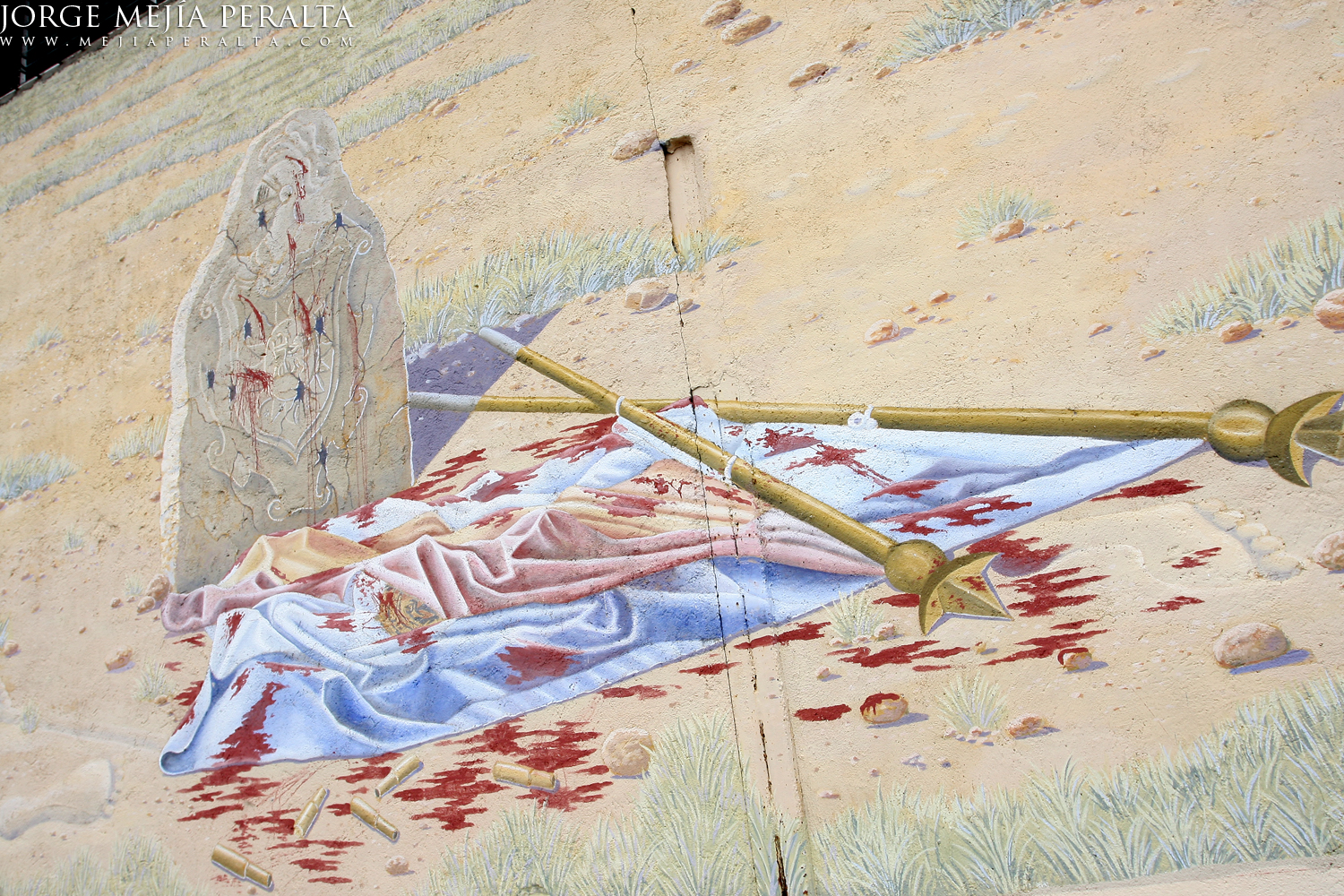
Mural in memory of the massacre of four students of the National Autonomous University of Nicaragua-León on July 23, 1959 by Somoza’s National Guard.

The oldest institution of higher education in Nicaragua is the National Autonomous University of Nicaragua, which was founded in León in 1812, during the Spanish colonial period. In Nicaragua, there are ten core public and private non-profit universities that receive state funding, and these constitute the members of the National Council of Universities. This body is responsible for strategic planning for higher education in Nicaragua, and it is also the organization that provide accreditation to other universities.

The members of the National Council of Universities are the oldest universities in Nicaragua, with the last one founded in 1992. Since the early 1990s, a large number of new private universities have been established in Nicaragua, responding to a greatly increased educational demand fueled by the increasing student enrollment in elementary and secondary schools during the 1980s. Most private universities that are not part of the National Council of Universities are members of either the Federation of Nicaraguan Private Universities (FENUP) or the Superior Council of Private Universities (COSUP). The major focus of these private universities are on business, computers and law, but together they span most areas of academic study.

The majority of higher education institutions are in Managua. Higher education has financial, organic and administrative autonomy, according to the law. Also, freedom of subjects is recognized. Nicaragua's higher education system consists of 58 universities, and 113 colleges and technical institutes in the areas of electronics, computer systems and sciences, agroforestry, construction and trade-related services. In 2005, almost 400,000 (7%) of Nicaraguans held a university degree.

== Academic degrees ==
Admission to higher education is on the basis of the Bachillerato, the leading secondary school qualification. Students are also subject to an entrance examination. The Licenciado (or Ingenierio in the case of engineering programs), is the main undergraduate degree and a four or five-year course of study. A professional title may also be awarded depending on the subject. Following the Licenciado, the first postgraduate degree is the Maestria, which lasts two years and culminates with the submission of a thesis.

Institutions of higher learning also offer two or three year courses in technical and vocational education. The main qualification studied for is the Técnico Superior.

Title	Type	Duration	Pre-requisite
Técnico Superior	Associate degree	1 to 3 years	10th grade/high school diploma
Licenciado	Licentiate's degree	4 to 5 years	High school diploma
Ingeniero	Engineer's degree	5 years	High school diploma
Arquitecto	Bachelor of Architecture	5 years	High school diploma
Doctor en Medicina	Doctor of Medicine	6 years	High school diploma
—	Specialist degree	6 to 9 months; 3 years specialized training in the form of a residency for MDs	BD, ED or MD
Máster	Master's degree	2 years	BD, ED or MD
Doctor	PhD	3 to 5 years	Master's degree

== List of universities ==
This is a list of the 58 universities accredited by the National Council of Universities in Nicaragua.

Notes:

- Names in **bold** indicates that the university is a member of the National Council of Universities (CNU).
- Main campus first on universities with multiple locations.

University	Degree programs (2012)	Locations	Students	Type	Founded / accredited	Main fields of study	Remarks
Adventist University of Nicaragua; Universidad Adventista de Nicaragua (UNADENIC)	4	Managua, Matagalpa		private	2003	Business, education, informatics, theology	
American College (AC); Universidad American College	9	Managua		private	2005	Business, informatics, law	
American University; Universidad Americana (UAM)	13	Managua	2000	private	1992	Architecture, business, dentistry, informatics, international relations, law, medicine	Not to be confused with La American University (LAAU)
American University of Health Sciences (AUHS)	2	Managua				Dentistry, medicine	
**Bluefields Indian and Caribbean University (BICU)**	25	Bluefields	7225		1992	Agriculture, business, civil engineering, education, forestry, law, marine biology, medicine, natural resources	
**Catholic University of Dry Tropic Farming and Livestock**; **Universidad Católica Agropecuaria del Trópico Seco (UCATSE)**	10	Estelí, León	1392	private, Diocese of Estelí	1974	Agriculture, dentistry, law, medicine, theology, veterinary medicine	
Catholic University Redemptoris Mater; Universidad Católica Redemptoris Mater (UNICA)	30	Managua		private	1991	Architecture, art, business, civil engineering, dentistry, informatics, education, law, medicine, theology	UNICA was the first private for-profit university founded in Nicaragua.
Center for Advanced Military Studies; Centro Superior de Estudios Militares (CSEM)	11	Managua		public	1993	Military studies	
**Central American University**; **Universidad Centroamericana (UCA)**	26	Managua	10008	private, Jesuit	1960	Architecture, business, engineering, informatics, humanities, law, social work	Oldest university in Managua.
Central American University of Business Studies; Universidad Centroamericana de Ciencias Empresariales (UCEM)	25	Managua		private	1997	Business, law, medicine, microbiology, nursing, nutrition, pharmacology, psychology	
Central University of Nicaragua; Universidad Central de Nicaragua (UCN)	10	Managua, Jinotepe, Estelí		private	1998	Business, informatics, law, medicine, pharmacology, psychology, veterinary medicine	Not to be confused with the defunct university with the same name founded in 1941.
Christian Autonomous University of Nicaragua; Universidad Cristiana Autónoma de Nicaragua (UCAN)	29	León, Juigalpa, Chinandega, Masaya, Matagalpa	4000	private	2001	Agriculture, architecture, engineering, health sciences, international relations, law	
Ibero-American University of Science and Technology; Universidad Iberoamericana de Ciencia y Tecnología (UNICIT)	24	Managua		private	1997	Architecture, business, design, engineering, informatics, law, optometry, pharmacology	
Immaculate Conception Catholic University of the Archdiocese of Managua; Universidad Católica Inmaculada Concepción de la Arquidiócesis de Managua (UCICAM)	2	Managua		private, Archdiocese of Managua	2011	Philosophy, theology	
Institute of Higher Legal Studies; Instituto de Altos Estudios Judiciales (IAEJ)	1	Managua				Law	
**International University of Agriculture and Livestock**; **Universidad Internacional de Agricultura y Ganadería (UNIAG)**	9	Rivas, Chinandega	806	private	1951	Agriculture, veterinary medicine	
International University for Sustainable Development; Universidad Internacional de Desarrollo Sostenible (UNIDES)	4	Managua		private	2005	Business, medicine	
International University of Latin American Integration; Universidad Internacional de la Integración de América Latina (UNIVAL)	28	Managua, Ocotal, Juigalpa, León, Matagalpa, Estelí, Chinandega, Jalapa, Jinotega		private	1997	Business, informatics, law	
Jean Jacques Rosseau University; Universidad Jean Jacques Rosseau (UNIJJAR)	9	Managua		private	2002	Business, dentistry, informatics, law, medicine, pharmacology	
John Paul II University of Applied Social Sciences; Universidad de Ciencias Sociales Aplicadas Juan Pablo II (UCSA)	7	Managua		private, Nicaraguan Bishops Conference	2002	Communication, philosophy, social work, theology	
Keiser University-Latin American Campus (KU)	9	San Marcos	500	private	1993	Business, informatics	Formerly Ave Maria University; became Keiser University in 2013.
La American University (LAAU)	8	Managua			2007	Architecture, business, informatics, law, pharmacology, psychology	Not to be confused with the American University (UAM).
La Anunciata University; Universidad La Anunciata (UA)	5	Rivas		private	2002	Business, informatics, pharmacology	
La Salle Technological University; Universidad Tecnológica La Salle (ULSA)	4	León		private, Lasallian brothers	2009	Engineering, informatics	
Latin American Institute of Computing; Instituto Latinoamericano de Computación (ILCOMP)	6	Managua, Matagalpa, Masaya			2002	Business, informatics	Founded in 1991, ILCOMP was accredited as a university in 2002.
Martin Luther King Nicaraguan Evangelical University; Universidad Evangélica Nicaragüense Martin Luther King (UENIC-MLK)	11	Masaya, Rio Blanco, Nagarote, Matagalpa, San Rafael del Sur, Bonanza, Juigalpa	4000	private	1999	Business, education, informatics, law, psychology, theology	
Martin Luther University; Universidad Martín Lutero (UML)	15	Managua, Jalapa, Ocotal, Quilalí, Condega, Muelle de los Bueyes, Nueva Guinea, Rivas, Somoto		private	2002	Business, education, informatics, journalism, law, nursing, theology	
Metropolitan University; Universidad Metropolitana (UNIMET)	8	Managua		private	2002	Business, civil engineering, informatics, law	
**National Agrarian University**; **Universidad Nacional Agraria (UNA)**	12	Managua, Camoapa, Juigalpa	4110	public	1990	Agriculture, environmental science, forestry, rural development, veterinary medicine	Founded as the National Agricultural School in 1917. Converted to a faculty of UNAN Managua in 1980. Became the National Agrarian University in 1990.
**National Autonomous University of Nicaragua-León**; **Universidad Nacional Autónoma de Nicaragua-León (UNAN-León)**	43	León, Jinotega, Somoto, Somotillo, San Carlos	19850	public	1812	Business, dentistry, education, engineering, informatics, law, medicine, nursing, natural sciences, veterinary medicine	The oldest university in Nicaragua and the second oldest in Central America. The last university founded by Spain in its American colonies.
**National Autonomous University of Nicaragua**; **Universidad Nacional Autónoma de Nicaragua-Managua (UNAN-Managua)**	87	Managua, Estelí, Matagalpa, Jinotepe, Juigalpa	33629	public	1969	Architecture, business, dance, education, engineering, health, humanities, informatics, languages, law, science	The Managua campus of UNAN opened in 1969. Since 1982, UNAN-Managua and UNAN-León operates as separate entities.
**National University of Engineering**; **Universidad Nacional de Ingeniería (UNI)**	12	Managua, Estelí	12261	public	1983	Architecture, engineering	
Nicaraguan Technological University; Universidad Tecnológica Nicaragüense (UTN)	21	Managua, León		private	1997	Business, engineering, informatics	
Nicaraguan University of Science and Technology; Universidad Nicaragüense de Ciencia y Tecnología (UCYT)	17	Managua		private	2002	Business, informatics, law, psychology	
Paulo Freire University; Universidad Paulo Freire (UPF)	13	Managua, Diriamba, Río San Juan, Matagalpa		private	2002	Business, education, health sciences, law, social studies	
**Polytechnic University of Nicaragua**; **Universidad Politécnica de Nicaragua (UPOLI)**	24	Managua, Boaco, Estelí, Rivas	9463	private, non-profit	1967	Business, design, informatics, law, nursing, theology	Founded by the Nicaraguan Baptist Convention.
Popular University of Nicaragua; Universidad Popular de Nicaragua (UPONIC)	16	Managua, Matagalpa, Masaya, Granada, Juigalpa, Estelí, Chinandega		private	1992	Business, education, engineering, informatics, law	
Ruben Dario University; Universidad Rubén Darío (URD)	3	Diriamba, Managua			1992	Business, informatics, law, pharmacology, psychology	
Spanish-American University; Universidad Hispanoamericana (UHISPAM)	13	Managua		private	1999	Business, informatics, journalism, law, pharmacology, psychology	
Technical University of Commerce; Universidad Técnica de Comercio (UTC)	12	Managua		private	2001	Business, informatics	Founded in 1966 as the Polytechnic School of Commerce.
Thomas More Universitas; Universidad Thomas More (UTM)	9	Managua		private	2000	Business	
University of Administration, Commerce and Customs; Universidad de Administración, Comercio y Aduana (UNACAD)	1	Managua, Somoto, Chinandega, Rivas, Bluefields		private	2003	Business, law	
University of Chinandega; Universidad de Chinandega (UACH)	10	Chinandega		private	1997	Business, engineering, law	
University of Commercial Sciences; Universidad de Ciencias Comerciales (UCC)	26	Managua, León		private	1997	Architecture, business, design, informatics, veterinary medicine	Founded as the Institute of Commercial Sciences in 1964. Renamed as the Center of Commercial Sciences in 1976, and the University of Commercial Sciences in 1990. Accredited as a university in 1997.
University of Health and Renewable Energy; Universidad de Ciencias de la Salud y Energía Renovables (UCSER)	3	Somoto				Pharmacology, renewable energy	
University of Humanistic Studies; Universidad de Estudios Humanísticos (UNEH)	3	Managua, Jinotepe, Masaya, Juigalpa, Mateare, Rivas			2008	Business, construction engineering, informatics, journalism, law, pharmacology, psychology	
University of Managua; Universidad de Managua (UdeM)	10	Managua, León		private	1998	Business, informatics, journalism, law	
University of Medical Sciences; Universidad de Ciencias Médicas (UCM)	2	Managua			2006	Dentistry, medicine, nutrition, pharmacology	
University of Northern Nicaragua; Universidad del Norte de Nicaragua (UNN)	17	Jinotega, Matagalpa, Estelí, Ocotal, Somoto, Jalapa, Sébaco			1997	Agricultural engineering, business, informatics, law, psychology, sociology	
University of Oriental Medicine Japan-Nicaragua; Universidad de Medicina Oriental Japón-Nicaragua (UMO-JN)	1	Managua		private, non-profit	2003	Oriental medicine	Formerly the Instituto de Estudios Superiores de Medicina Oriental Japón-Nicaragua (IESMO). The first university in Latin America dedicated to train professionals in oriental medicine.
University of St. Thomas; Universidad Santo Tomas de Oriente y Mediodía (USTOM)	6	Granada		private	2003	Business, law	
University of Technology and Commerce; Universidad de Tecnología y Comercio (UNITEC)	7	Managua		private	2005	Business, informatics	
University of the Americas; Universidad de las Américas (ULAM)	7	Managua		private	1998	Business, law	
**University of the Autonomous Regions of the Nicaraguan Caribbean Coast**; **Universidad de las Regiones Autónomas de la Costa Caribe Nicaragüense (URACCAN)**	38	Puerto Cabezas, Siuna, Bluefields, Nueva Guinea	4438		1992	Agriculture, business, education, fisheries science, forestry	
University of Pacific; Universidad del Pacífico (UNIP)	4	Managua		private	2012	Business, informatics, law	
University of the Valley; Universidad del Valle (UNIVALLE)	7	Managua		private	1999	Architecture, business, design, law	
Walter Mendoza Martínez Police Academy; Academia de Policía Walter Mendoza Martínez (ACAPOL)	2	Managua		public	2000	Law	Founded in 1979; received university status in 2000.
Western University; Universidad de Occidente (UDO)	20	León, Managua, Granada			1994	Business, engineering, law, nursing, pharmacology	

== See also ==
- Education in Nicaragua
- List of schools in Nicaragua
- Nicaraguan Literacy Campaign
