= Juigalpa, Chontales =

Juigalpa
- Municipality
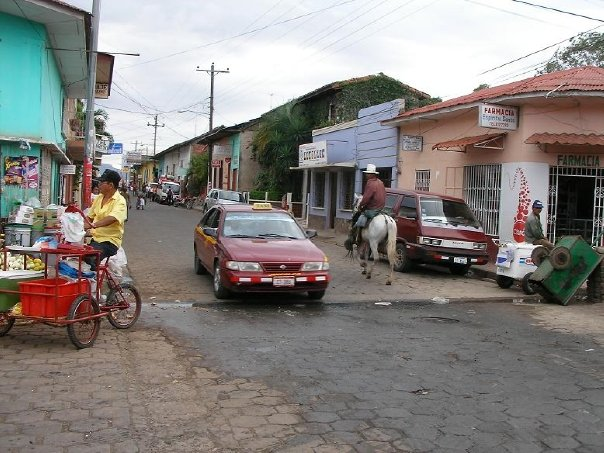
- Street in Juigalpa

- Flag

- Location within Nicaragua
- Coordinates: 12°6′N 85°22′W
- Country: Nicaragua
- Department: Chontales
- Founded: April 24, 1668

Government
  - Elect Mayor 2008: Augusto Ayala Calero (PLC)

Area
  - Municipality: 727 km^{2} (281 sq mi)
- Elevation: 116.85 m (383.4 ft)

Population (2022 estimate)
  - Municipality: 61,411
  - Density: 84.5/km^{2} (219/sq mi)
  - Urban: 53,798
- Time zone: UTCGMT-6

Juigalpa (Spanish pronunciation: [xwiˈɣalpa]) is the municipal seat of Juigalpa Municipality and the capital city of the Chontales Department of Nicaragua. It is located within the municipality of Juigalpa, approximately 140 km east of Managua on Carretera Rama, in the central region of Nicaragua.

Juigalpa Municipality has a population of 61,411 and extends for 727 km², with a population density of 84/km² (2022 estimate).

== History ==
In 1659, mayor Jeronimo Villegas requested land from a Spanish government representative, Sebastian Alvarez, for the foundation of a town. This request was granted on April 24, 1668. On June 11, 1877, Juigalpa was declared the department capital for the second and last time after a 19-year dispute with Acoyapa. Juigalpa was elevated to the status of a city on January 27, 1879. The name Juigalpa means “land abundant of jicaro,” and “origin of black snails” in an Indian tongue. The city was used as a stop-over point for miners and farmers from the surrounding area.

== Geography ==
Juigalpa sits within a valley in the Amerrisque Mountains. The Carretera passes through the lowest parts of the city with the elevation rising on both sides. Higher points throughout the city provide clear views of the Amerrisque mountains.

== Climate ==
Climate data for Juigalpa (1991–2020, extremes 1960-present)
Month	Jan	Feb	Mar	Apr	May	Jun	Jul	Aug	Sep	Oct	Nov	Dec	Year
Record high °C (°F)	35.4 (95.7)	36.6 (97.9)	38.0 (100.4)	37.6 (99.7)	37.4 (99.3)	36.0 (96.8)	35.2 (95.4)	37.0 (98.6)	35.8 (96.4)	37.2 (99.0)	34.0 (93.2)	35.9 (96.6)	38.0 (100.4)
Mean daily maximum °C (°F)	31.0 (87.8)	31.9 (89.4)	33.0 (91.4)	34.6 (94.3)	33.6 (92.5)	31.5 (88.7)	31.7 (89.1)	32.3 (90.1)	32.4 (90.3)	31.7 (89.1)	31.6 (88.9)	31.1 (88.0)	32.2 (90.0)
Daily mean °C (°F)	27.0 (80.6)	27.5 (81.5)	28.2 (82.8)	29.6 (85.3)	29.3 (84.7)	28.0 (82.4)	28.1 (82.6)	28.3 (82.9)	28.0 (82.4)	27.6 (81.7)	27.6 (81.7)	27.4 (81.3)	28.0 (82.4)
Mean daily minimum °C (°F)	23.0 (73.4)	23.1 (73.6)	23.4 (74.1)	24.6 (76.3)	25.0 (77.0)	24.4 (75.9)	24.5 (76.1)	24.4 (75.9)	23.6 (74.5)	23.5 (74.3)	23.6 (74.5)	23.7 (74.7)	23.9 (75.0)
Record low °C (°F)	18.0 (64.4)	16.0 (60.8)	18.4 (65.1)	19.0 (66.2)	18.8 (65.8)	17.0 (62.6)	18.8 (65.8)	17.6 (63.7)	18.2 (64.8)	17.8 (64.0)	18.8 (65.8)	19.2 (66.6)	16.0 (60.8)
Source: Météo Climat

== Education ==
Juigalpa is home to many branches of Nicaraguan and Central American universities.

- Universidad Nacional de Ingenieria [UNI]
- Universidad Cristiana Autónoma de Nicaragua (UCAN)
- Universidad Internacional (UNIVAL) - Chontales
- Universidad Nacional Agraria - Juigalpa
- Universidad Nacional Autónoma de Nicaragua (UNAN) - Chontales
- Universidad Popular de Nicaragua (UPONIC)

== Economy ==
In comparison to other parts of Nicaragua, Juigalpa is rather prosperous. The department of Chontales produces 90% of the beef in Nicaragua, and is the dominant industry in the region. Because Juigalpa is the largest city in the region, it has many commerce and service sector businesses as well.

== Entertainment ==
As the largest city in the south-central region of Nicaragua, Juigalpa has various entertainment options. Plaza Mayor or Main Square is the main venue in the city for it is surrounded by the Cathedral, the main public buildings, shops, restaurants, and bars. Students and children hang out or play around the band stand in the early afternoons while families and visitors come out in the evening for a stroll, hang around the fountain, or to have dinner across the street. Peatonal Asunción _a pedestrianized street_ is a brand new addition to the city's attractions with a fountain, benches, plenty of shade trees, and coffeeshops, ice cream parlors, and leathergood stores. About four blocks east of Plaza Mayor there is Palo Solo Park a neatly manicured overlook on a hill with great views of the city and the surrounding Amerrisque Mountains.

Dancing is one of the favorite pastimes in Nicaragua. Juigalpa features three “discotecas” or dance clubs.

Juigalpa also features the Thomas Belt Zoo, with an impressive selection of animals.

There is also the Gregorio Aguilar Barea Archaeological Museum in Juigalpa, featuring several stone carvings and other artifacts found in the Amerrisque Mountains. Many of these artifacts are from the Chontal natives.

== Transportation ==
All of the bus routes to and from Juigalpa can be found at Mercado Mayoreo in Managua. Juigalpa is approximately three hours from Managua by ordinary bus, and two hours on an express bus. There are also charter helicopters available from Managua. Taxi cabs are the predominant means of transportation within the city.

== Fiestas Patronales ==
The patron saint celebrations (fiestas patronales) during the week of August 15 celebrate the Assumption of the Virgin Mary. This patron saint festival is renowned as one of the best in Central America, drawing people from neighboring countries. Much of this celebration takes place in the Plaza de Toros near the center of town. Here, the highlighted event is bull riding. On average, five people die every year from bull riding-related injuries. As a result, there is a saying in Juigalpa, “It is not a good patron saint festival if nobody dies.”

There are two fairs during the patron saint festival. One is produced by the mayor’s office in the center of town. The other, and larger of the two, is organized by a microfinance NGO, PRODESA, and takes place in the PRODESA fairgrounds located on the western side of town.

== Infrastructure & communication ==
Electric service is very consistent relative to the Pacific side of Nicaragua as it does not share a power plant with Managua.

Conventional landline telephone is provided by Enitel, the national telephone company. The two cellphone companies in Nicaragua, Claro and Movistar, have extensive coverage in Juigalpa.

There are a handful of radio stations in Juigalpa, including Radio Asunción 720 AM, Radio Centro 870 AM, Radio Sabrocita 100.1 FM and Estereo Medidano 94.1. There are two local television channels, Canal 14 and Canal 20.

There is only one public hospital in Juigalpa, the Hospital Camilo Ortega Saavedra.

== International relations ==
=== Twin towns – Sister cities ===
Juigalpa is a sister city to one city in the United States:

- (United States) Ann Arbor, Michigan

Juigalpa is a sister city to one city in the Netherlands:

- (Netherlands) Leiden
