= Lincoln International Academy =

Coordinates: 12.08591°N 86.22286°W

- Las Colinas Sur; Managua, Nicaragua

Information
- Type: Private
- Motto: A Catholic College Preparatory School
- Established: 1991
- General Director: Adolfo Gonzalez
- Grades: Pre K-12
- Gender: Coeducational
- Enrollment: 709
- Language: English, Spanish
- Colors: Blue and Yellow
- Nickname: Hawks
- Rival: American Nicaraguan School
- Website: www.lincoln.edu.ni

Lincoln International Academy is located in Managua, Nicaragua. It is a Catholic private school. This school that was founded in 1995. It is one of the few schools in Nicaragua that offer bilingual education (Spanish-English). LIA is accredited by the Southern Association of Colleges and Schools since February 2009. LIA is also a member of the National Catholic Educational Association, the Association of American Schools in Central America, and hosts the Masters in Education Program by Framingham State University.

== History ==
Founded in Managua in 1991 and later moved to a 5-hectare (12-acre) campus, the new campus was built with the construction building code of California, USA, and has a highly advanced security system. The Nicaraguan Ministry of Education accredited Lincoln International Academy in 1995 .

== Sports ==
- Basketball
- Cross Country
- Gymnastics
- Soccer
- Swimming
- Track & Field
- Volleyball

== Extracurricular Activities ==
- HACIA Democracy
- Knowledge Bowl
- Model United Nations
- Mu Alpha Theta
- National Honor Society
- Student Council

== See also ==
- List of schools in Nicaragua
- Education in Nicaragua
- List of universities in Nicaragua
