= List of schools in Nicaragua =

The following is a list of notable schools in Nicaragua, a Central American country.

== List ==
- Colegio Bautista de Managua, Managua
- Colegio Centro América, Managua
- Colegio La Salle, León
- German Nicaraguan School, Managua
- Instituto Loyola, Managua
- Instituto Pedagógico La Salle, Managua
- Lincoln International Academy, Managua
- Lycée Franco-Nicaraguayen Victor Hugo, Managua
- Nicaragua Christian Academy

== See also ==
- Education in Nicaragua
- Lists of schools
- List of universities in Nicaragua
