= Ethnic groups in Central America =

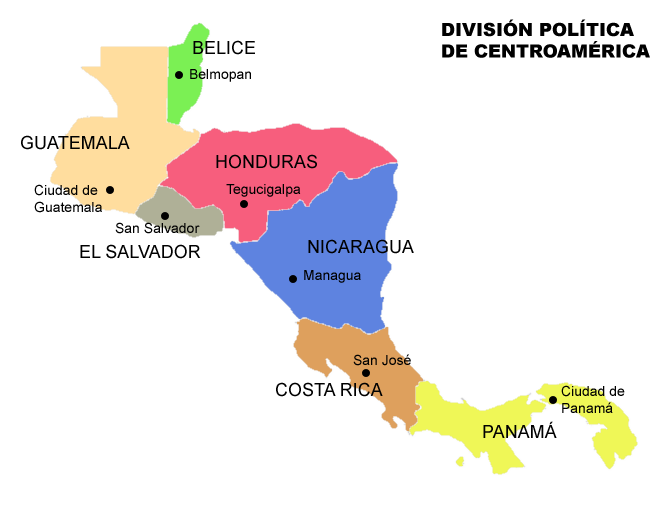
Countries and capitals of Central America

Central America is a subregion of the Americas formed by six Latin American countries and one (officially) Anglo-American country, Belize. As an isthmus it connects South America with the remainder of mainland North America, and comprises the following countries (from north to south): Belize, Guatemala, Honduras, El Salvador, Nicaragua, Costa Rica, and Panama.

The inhabitants of Central America represent a variety of ancestries, ethnic groups, and races, making the region one of the most diverse in the world. Biologically the whole population is the result of mixed Amerindian–European-African, although the cultural classification consist to self-identified as mestizo, while others trend to self-identified as European ancestry. Asian and mixed race Afro-Amerindian minorities are also identified regularly. People with mestizo ancestry are the largest single group, and along with people who claim having a greater European ancestry, comprise approximately 80% of the population, or even more.

In 2007, Central America had a population of approximately 40 million persons within an area of 523,780 km^{2}, yielding an overall density of 77.3 inhabitants/km^{2} that is not distributed evenly. For example, Belize is larger than El Salvador in area by 1,924 km^{2}, but El Salvador has 30 times the population of Belize. Similarly, the population of Panama is greater than that of Costa Rica, while Panama is greater in area. Guatemala has the largest population with 18.41 million, followed by Honduras 11.01 million.

== Population and density ==
Country or territory with flag	Area (km^{2}) (per sq mi)	Population (July 2012 est.)	Population density per km^{2}	Capital
Guatemala	108,889 km^{2} (42,042 sq mi)	14,099,032	116.8/km^{2} (4,913.9/sq mi)	Guatemala City
Belize	22,966 km^{2} (8,867 sq mi)	307,899	13/km^{2} (546.9/sq mi)	Belmopan
El Salvador	21,040 km^{2} (8,120 sq mi)	6,090,646	330.2/km^{2} (13,891.9/sq mi)	San Salvador
Honduras	112,090 km^{2} (43,280 sq mi)	8,296,693	66.7/km^{2} (2,806.1/sq mi)	Tegucigalpa
Nicaragua	129,494 km^{2} (49,998 sq mi)	5,727,707	43.8/km^{2} (1,842.7/sq mi)	Managua
Costa Rica	51,180 km^{2} (19,760 sq mi)	4,636,348	70.8/km^{2} (2,978.6/sq mi)	San José
Panama	78,200 km^{2} (30,200 sq mi)	3,360,474	41.4/km^{2} (1,741.7/sq mi)	Panama City
Total	523,780	42,071,038	77.3/km^{2}	

== Mestizos ==
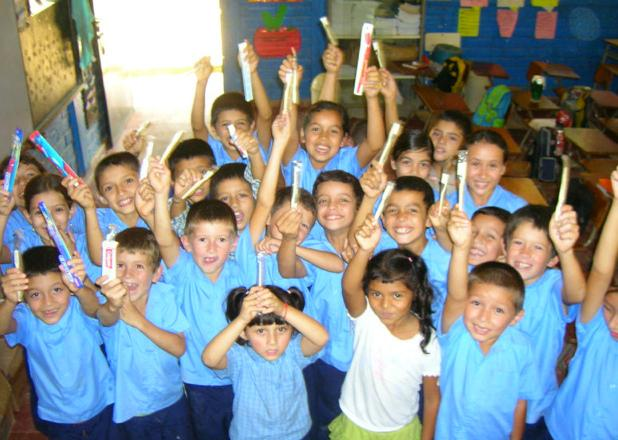
Salvadoran School Children from Metapan

Central American Admixture began with the arrival of the Spaniards to Central America, whose consequences could still be perceived in the present-day Central American Society. During the colonial period, Mestizos were the result of the admixture between Spaniards and Native Americans (or Amerindians), although the scope of this admixture (including African presence) covered all citizens during next generations, potentially all population have Europeans, Amerindian and African ancestors.

Self-identified or classified Mestizos are the majority in El Salvador, Honduras, Guatemala, and Nicaragua. formed by 22,425,257 inhabitants, occupying the majority of the Central American population, and all 7 countries have significant Mestizo populations.

The Mestizaje begins when Europeans arrived in the territory of Central America, due to the shortage of European women, European men intermarried with indigenous women. Mestizos used the third social group of the social pyramid of the Spanish, although in countries like Costa Rica and El Salvador, the mestizos were seen as the same group with the Criollos. For various reasons, such as the scarcity of indigenous populations, at this point of the history the majority of the population in Central America were biologically mixed. In El Salvador and Costa Rica, several future borns left the indigenous tribes; this did not happen in Guatemala or Honduras until the XVIII century. In Costa Rica, caste systems were implemented, which appeared different terms.

The country with the highest percentage of classified Mestizo population in the Central American Region is Honduras, with multitudes of Mestizo populations scattered throughout its territory. In El Salvador and Nicaragua the classified Mestizo population is the majority. In Costa Rica the classified mestizo population is the first ethnic minority, although according to the surveys it is seen as the same group with the people who identified themselves as Whites, the majority of the population is made up of whites/mestizos.

== Amerindians ==
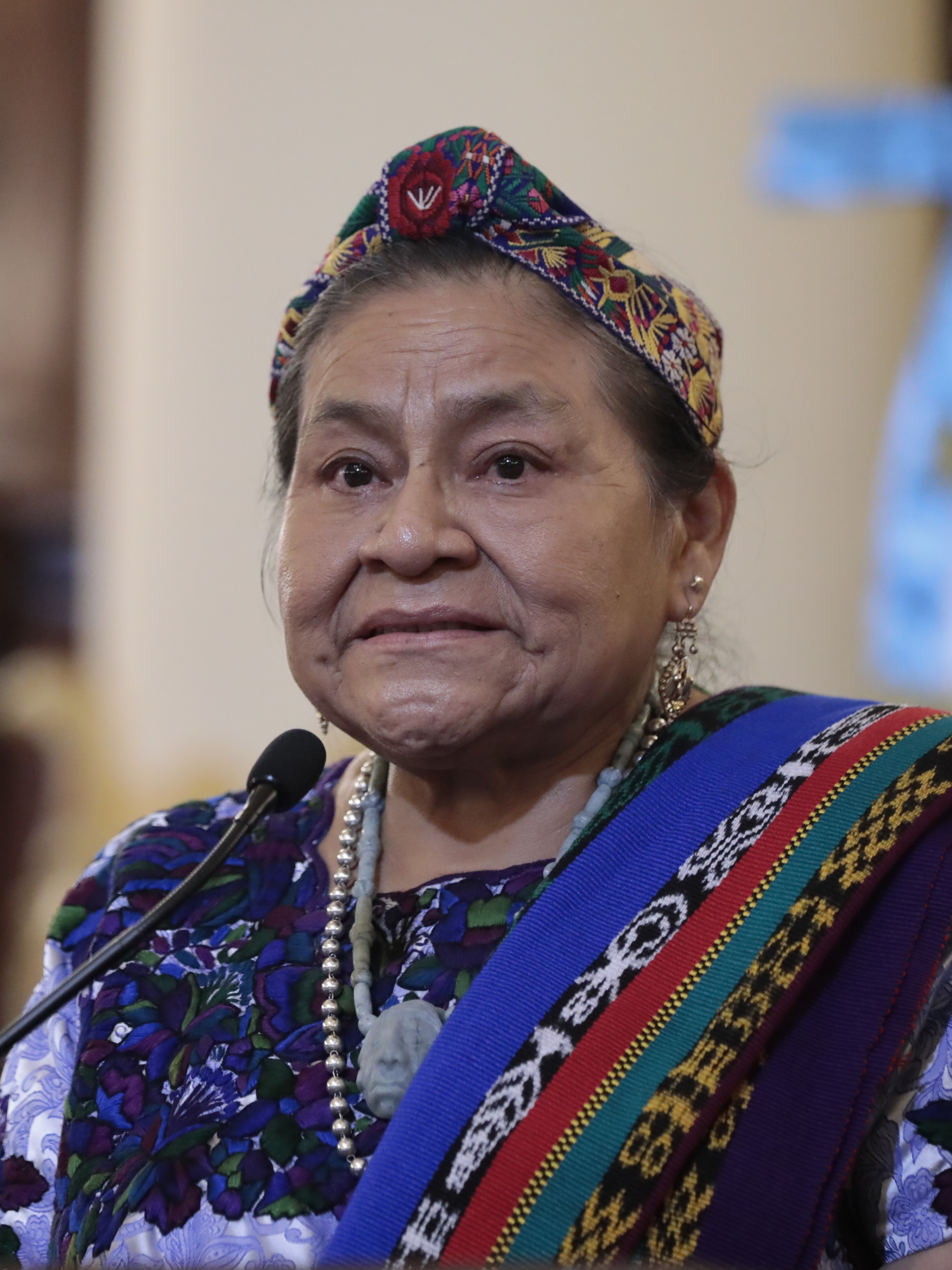
Rigoberta Menchú, Human rights activist. K'iche'-Guatemalan

The only plurality of Amerindian, or indigenous, people in Central America is in Guatemala. Amerindians comprise minorities in the other Central American countries.

Before the arrival of the Spanish in Central America, there were an estimated 1.1 million people in Honduras, 800 thousand people in Guatemala, 450 thousand in Costa Rica, 325 thousand in Nicaragua, 196 thousand in Panama, 91 thousand in El Salvador and only 7 thousand in Belize. However, the numbers are highly variable, according to Bernardo Augusto Thiel, the indigenous population in Costa Rica was around 27,000, in El Salvador less than 100,000, in Nicaragua, Honduras and Panama 750,000 and more than a million in Guatemala. On the other hand, other historians give intermediate figures, more than a million in Guatemala and Honduras, 750 thousand in Nicaragua and Panama, 200,000 in El Salvador and 100,000 in Costa Rica.

The indigenous population had a significant decline due to diseases and hostility of the Spanish towards the indigenous, mainly in Costa Rica and El Salvador, which many people left their indigenous tribes at the beginning of colonial rule. The progressive unions between Europeans and Amerindians cause the loss of racial purity both inside the region and whole continent.

After independence, the indigenous population classified was very numerous, in Guatemala it represented 64%, around 30% of the populations of Honduras and Nicaragua, 20% in El Salvador and in Costa Rica 13% were classified as indigenous.

=== Guatemala ===
The classified Amerindian populations in Guatemala include the K'iche' 9.1%, Kaqchikel 8.4%, Mam 7.9% and Q'eqchi 6.3%. 8.6% of the population is "other Mayan," 0.4% is indigenous non-Mayan, making the indigenous community in Guatemala about 40.5% of the population.

=== Belize ===
Roughly 10% of the population is self-identified as Amerindian, mostly Maya. Three Maya groups now inhabit the country: The Yucatec (who came from Yucatán, Mexico to escape the Caste War of the 1840s), the Mopan (indigenous to Belize but were forced out by the British; they returned from Guatemala to evade slavery in the 19th century), and Kekchi (also fled from slavery in Guatemala in the 19th century). The later groups are chiefly found in the Toledo District.

=== Panama ===
According to the 2010 census in Panama, approximately 12.3% of the nation's population identified themselves as indigenous. The Amerindian population figure stood at 417,500 individuals in 2010.

=== Honduras ===
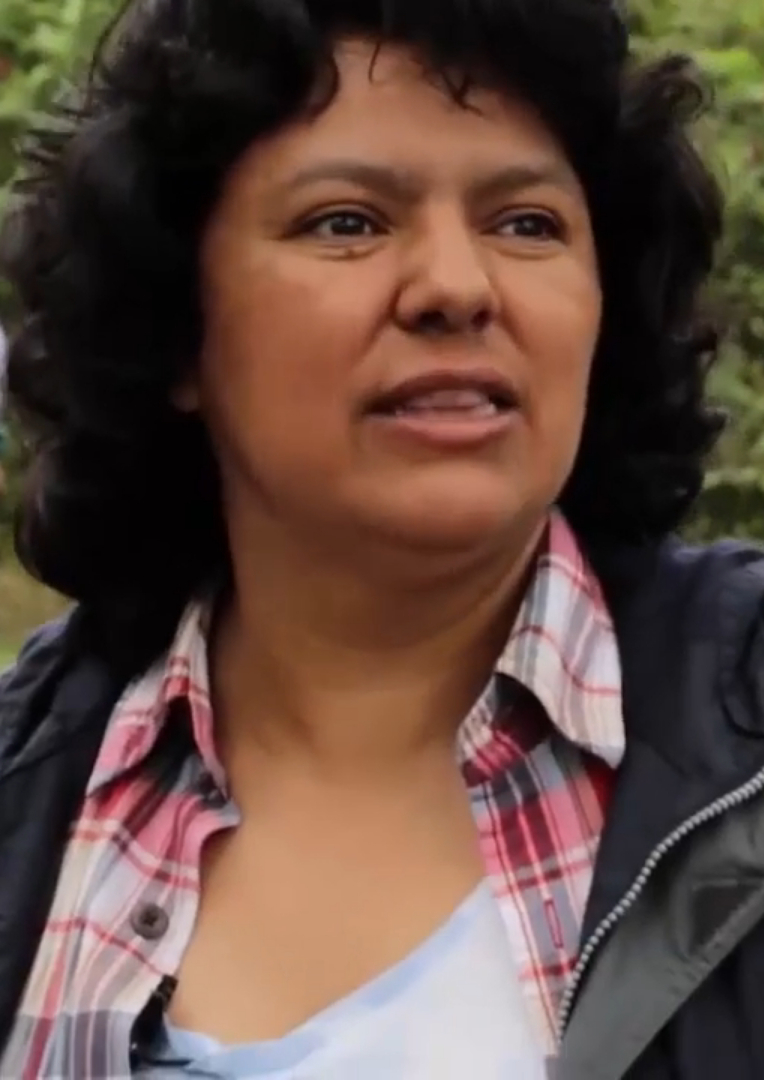
Berta Caceres, Lencan environmental activist. -Honduran

About 7% of the Honduran population are members of one of the seven recognized indigenous groups, most of them are from Lenca, Chorti, and Tolupan origin.

=== Nicaragua ===
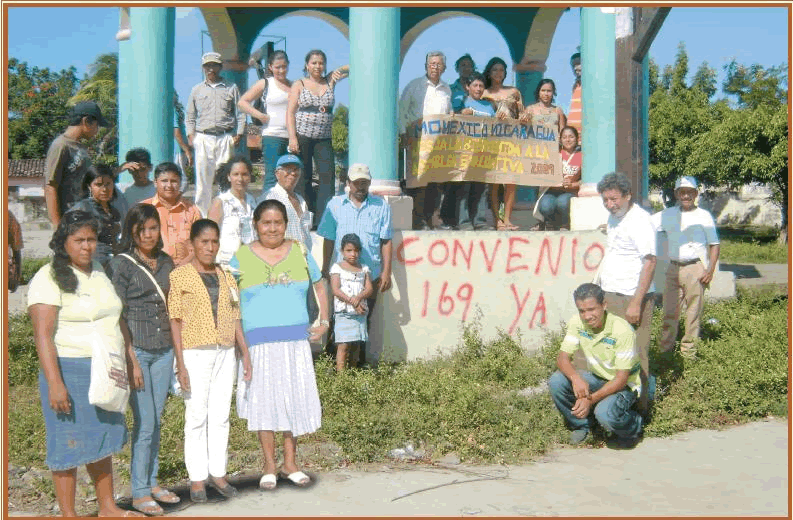
Nicarao community in Rivas, Nicaragua.

5% of Nicaraguans are classified as Amerindians, the unmixed descendants of the country's indigenous inhabitants. Nicaragua's pre-Columbian population consisted of many indigenous groups. In the western region the Nicarao people, a Nahua group after whom the country is named, were present along with other Mesoamerican groups such as the Chorotegas and the Subtiabas who are Otomanguean-speaking. The Caribbean coast of Nicaragua was inhabited by indigenous peoples who were mostly Chibchan-speaking groups that had migrated from South America, primarily present day Colombia and Venezuela. These groups include the Miskitos, Ramas and Sumos. In the 19th century, there was a substantial indigenous minority, but this group was also largely assimilated culturally into the mestizo majority.

=== Costa Rica ===
There are over 104,000 classified Amerindian inhabitants, comprising 2.4% of the Costa Rican population. Most of them live in secluded reservations, distributed among eight ethnic groups: Quitirrisí (in the Central Valley), Matambú or Chorotega (Guanacaste), Maleku (northern Alajuela), Bribri (southern Atlantic), Cabécar (Cordillera de Talamanca), Guaymí (southern Costa Rica, along the Panamá border), Boruca (southern Costa Rica) and Térraba (southern Costa Rica).

=== El Salvador ===
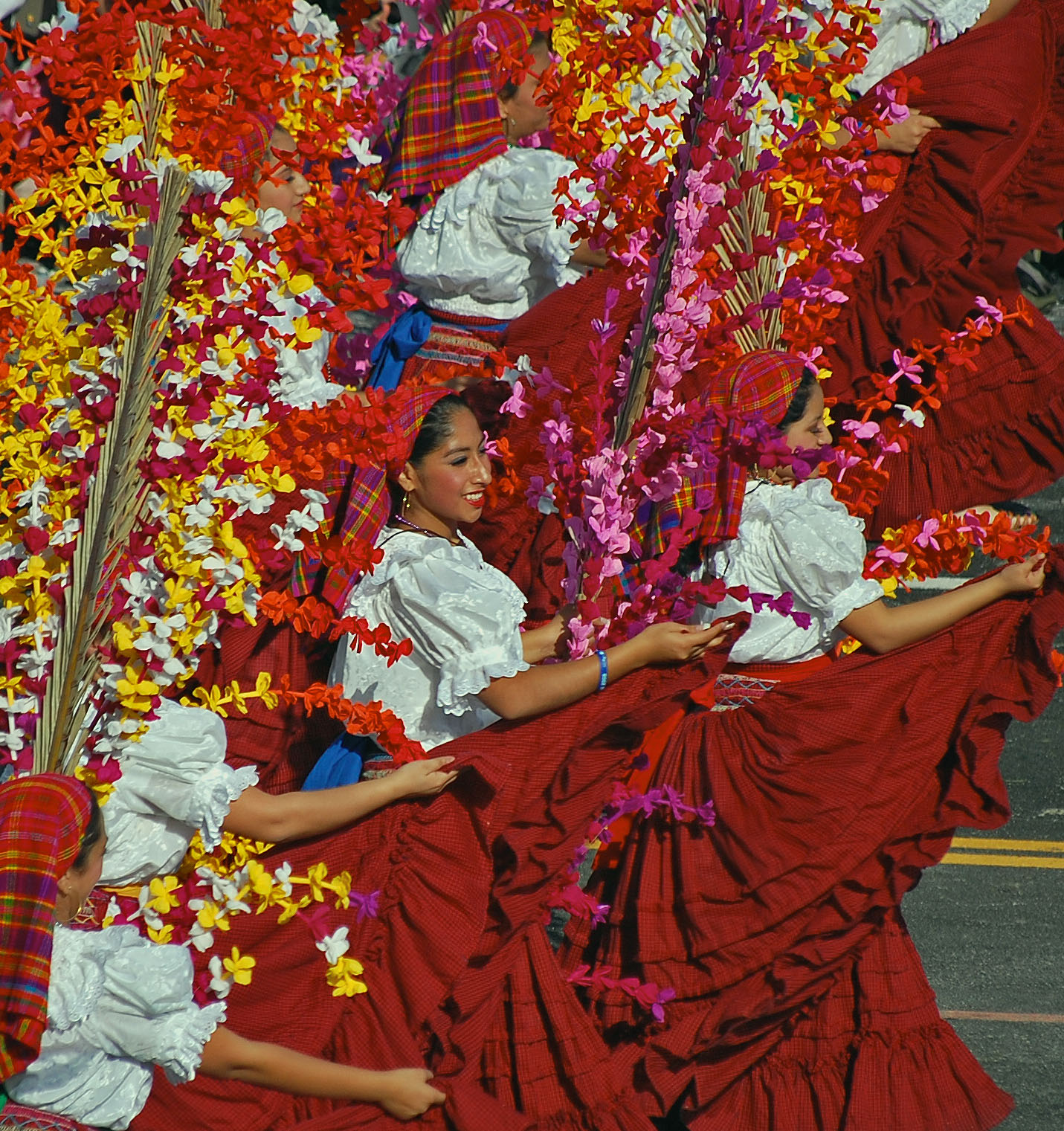
Indigenous Salvadoran women dancing in the traditional "Procession of Palms" a custom celebrated in the town of Panchimalco in El Salvador.

Only 1% of the Salvadoran population consider themselves as indigenous in the census, mostly Pipil, Lenca and Kakawira (Cacaopera). The current low numbers of indigenous people may be partly explained by mass murders by European colonizers. They wanted to exterminate the indigenous race and other tribes in Central America. Today many Pipil and other Indigenous populations live in small towns of El Salvador like Izalco, Panchimalco, Sacacoyo, and Nahuizalco.

Country	Percentage	Indigenous pop.
Guatemala	40.5	6,976,989
Belize	10.6	32,495
El Salvador	1.0	60,906
Honduras	7.0	545,499
Nicaragua	5.0	294,559
Costa Rica	2.4	104,000
Panama	12.3	417,500
Total	16.24	8,431,988

== Europeans ==
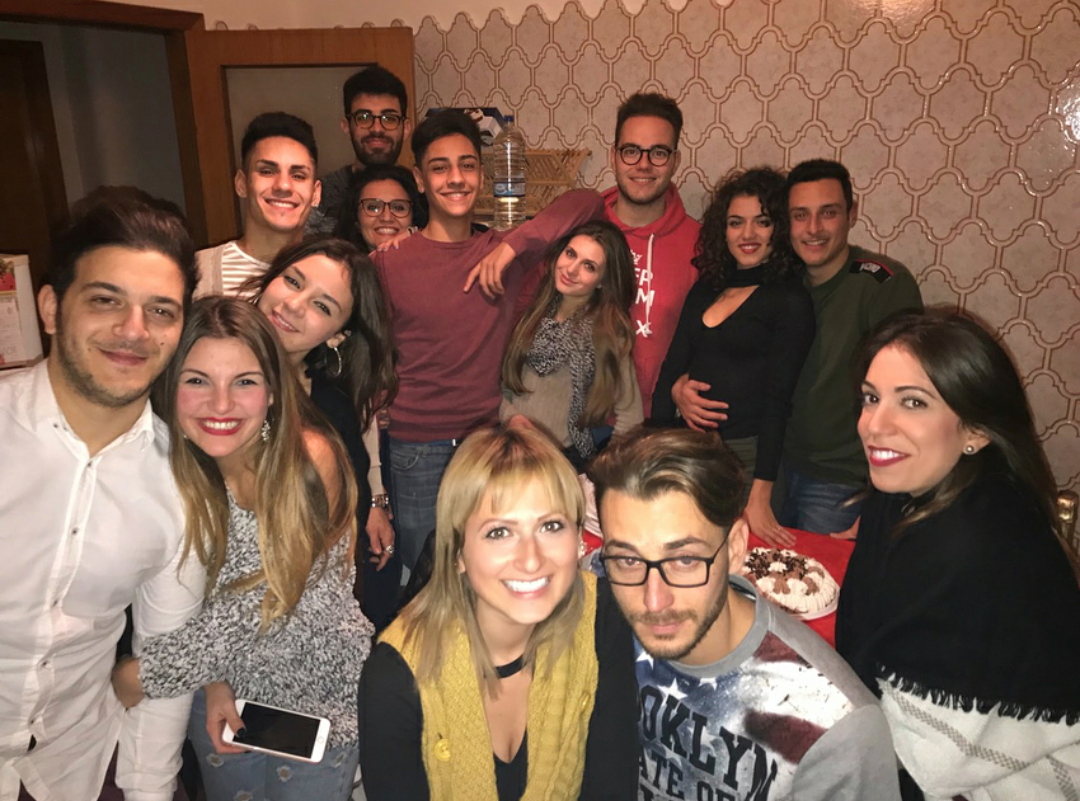
Young Costa Ricans in San José.

The first contact of Europeans with Central America occurred in 1502, during the fourth voyage of Christopher Columbus, who sailed the Caribbean coasts of present-day Honduras, Nicaragua, Costa Rica and Panama.

After the conquest of the native population, the Spanish established a caste system in which they and their descendants occupied the upper part of the social pyramid. Being the peninsular who had the right to high political, religious and military positions. It is for this reason that it was the White settler population who started the independence movements at the beginning of the 19th century.

When Central America became independent in El Salvador they were more than 10% classified in the census. In Costa Rica they were more than 9%, Guatemala and Nicaragua they represented 5%. In Honduras were classified less than 3%.

Liberal reforms began in 1870 in Central America, being successful in Guatemala, El Salvador and Costa Rica, this attracted thousands of immigrants, mainly Italian, German and Spanish.

The construction of large infrastructure works such as the Panama Canal or the Atlantic Railroad in Costa Rica, demanded the entry of thousands of Spanish, Italian and Greek workers.

Germans also arrived in Guatemala, Nicaragua and Costa Rica to dedicate themselves to agricultural activities, In Costa Rica and El Salvador, the entry of hundreds of thousands of Italians in the first decades of the 20th century was one of the most important movements that had demographic weight.

During World War I and World War II, thousands of Jews, mainly from Germany and Poland, entered the Region Panama, Costa Rica, El Salvador and Guatemala were the ones that received the most.

Currently Costa Rica has the highest percentage of people classified as Euro-Latino or white origin, followed by Nicaragua and El Salvador, however there are also significant populations classified in the other Central American nations.

Costa Rica
As of 2012, most Costa Ricans are primarily of Spanish ancestry. Many also have German, Italian, French, Dutch, British, Swedish, and Greek ancestry. Whites and mestizos together are classified at 83% of the population. European migrants used Costa Rica to get across the isthmus of Central America as well to reach the Californian coast in the late-19th and early-20th centuries prior to the opening of the Panama Canal. Other European ethnic groups known to live in Costa Rica include Russians, Danes, Belgians, Portuguese, Croats, and Hungarians.

Nicaragua
17% of Nicaraguans are classified as white, mostly of German and Spanish descent, resulting in Nicaragua having one of the largest white populations in Central America. During the mid-19th century and early-20th century immigration was encouraged by the government giving land in areas of Esteli, Jinotega, Matagalpa, Managua-El Crucero, Carazo, Nueva Segovia and Madriz, mainly to German, but also French and Eastern European immigrants who were willing to work the land. In addition Nicaragua has the second largest Russian diaspora in Central America after Guatemala.
El Salvador
12% of Salvadorans are classified white, mostly descendants of the Spaniard colonizers, with others descending from French, Italians, Portuguese, British, Germans and some other Central European ethnic groups.
Panama
Less than 7% of the Panamanian population identifies as white. European immigration to Panama in the 19th and 20th centuries included British people, Irish people, Dutch people, French people, Germans, Italians, Portuguese people, Poles, and Russians.
Guatemala
Five percent of Guatemalans identified themselves as whites of European descent in their majority Spanish and German.
Belize
In 2010, there were 13,964 classified White people living in Belize, forming 4.6% of the total population. 10,865 or 3.6% of the population were Mennonites of German/Dutch descend.
Honduras
1% of the Honduran population is identified as white, in other statistics it appears that whites in Honduras made up the 3% of the total population. These are people of mainly Spanish, British, Italian, French, and Jewish ancestry. However, the term white in Honduras can be a somewhat ambiguous definition, similar to what happens in other Latin American countries. This is because any white-skinned person is called a chele, a word in Honduras used for white skinned people, whether they are of Euro descent or of another ethnic origin, as in the case of Arabs, who in general in the case of Honduras are mostly of Palestinian descent.

== Afro Central Americans ==
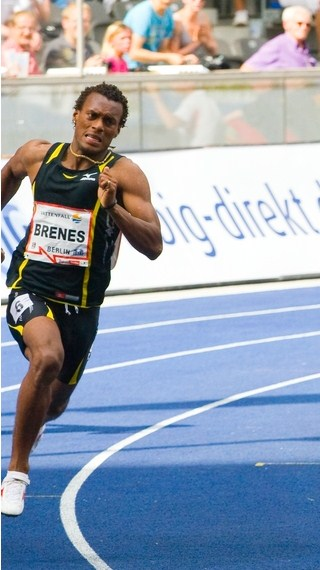
Nery Brenes Costa Rican Athlete

The self-identified Creole, Afro-Caribbean, and Garifuna populations form the majority of the Afro-Latin Americans in Central America, of which the majority is concentrated on the Caribbean coasts of the region. All these groups are distinct, speaking English, English creoles, Garifuna, Miskito, and Spanish. Afro-Central Americans makeup about 35% Central Americas total population according to multiple source studies reported by private institutions and accredited genetic researchers. The country with the highest percentage was 31% in Belize, where Kriols and Garifuna were once the majority of the nation that has seen heavy emigration and immigration in the last 30 years. Now the country with the highest percentage is Honduras where genetic studies show that 30% of the population are of Afro-Honduran, Mulatto, Miskito, Afro-Indigenous and majority African descended peoples ancestry.

The largest population, however, is in Honduras of Garifuna, English-speaking Creoles, Afro-Hondurans, and of Miskito descent, of which the majority is concentrated on the northern and eastern half of Honduras. As well as the Bay Islands Department. An estimated 600,000 Hondurans are of Garífuna descent, and, in addition to the Miskito and Creole population, Honduras has one of the largest African communities in Latin America. In Costa Rica about 8% of the population is classified as Black African descent or Mulatto (mix of European and black) who are called Afro-Costa Ricans, English-speaking descendants of 19th century black Jamaican immigrant workers. In Panama people who claim being of African descent were already present when the construction of an inter-oceanic channel saw the large arrival of immigrant afro-Caribbeans. Honduras has a small population of creole people, but the overwhelming majority of blacks are Garifuna. Classified Afro-Guatemalans are concentrated in the Caribbean department of Izabal and consist of a mix of Garifunas and other Afro-Caribbeans. Although El Salvador is the only Central American country with no official black percentage, El Salvador has had black African slavery in its history during the colonial era, over time they mixed with both Amerindians and Europeans causing their offspring to join into the general Mestizo population. But Afro-Salvadoran heritage commonly do exist.

Kriols In Belize, Kriols make up roughly 21% of the Belizean population and about 75% of the Diaspora. They are descendants of the Baymen slave owners, and slaves brought to Belize for the purpose of the logging industry. These slaves were mostly Black (many also of Miskito ancestry) from Nicaragua and born Africans who had spent very brief periods in Jamaica. Bay Islanders and more Jamaicans came in the late 19th century, further adding these already varied peoples, creating this ethnic group.

For all intents and purposes, Kriol is an ethnic and linguistic denomination, but some natives, even those blonde and blue-eyed, may call themselves Kriols. It is defined as more a cultural attribute and not limited to physical appearance.

Country or territory with flag	% Local	Population	% Regional
Guatemala	2.0	276,489	
Belize	31	95,488	
Honduras	2.0	600,000	
Nicaragua	9.0	500,000	
Costa Rica	8.0*	333,727	
Panama	14.0	470,466	
Total		1,862,234	4.43

*(includes mulattoes)

== Asians ==
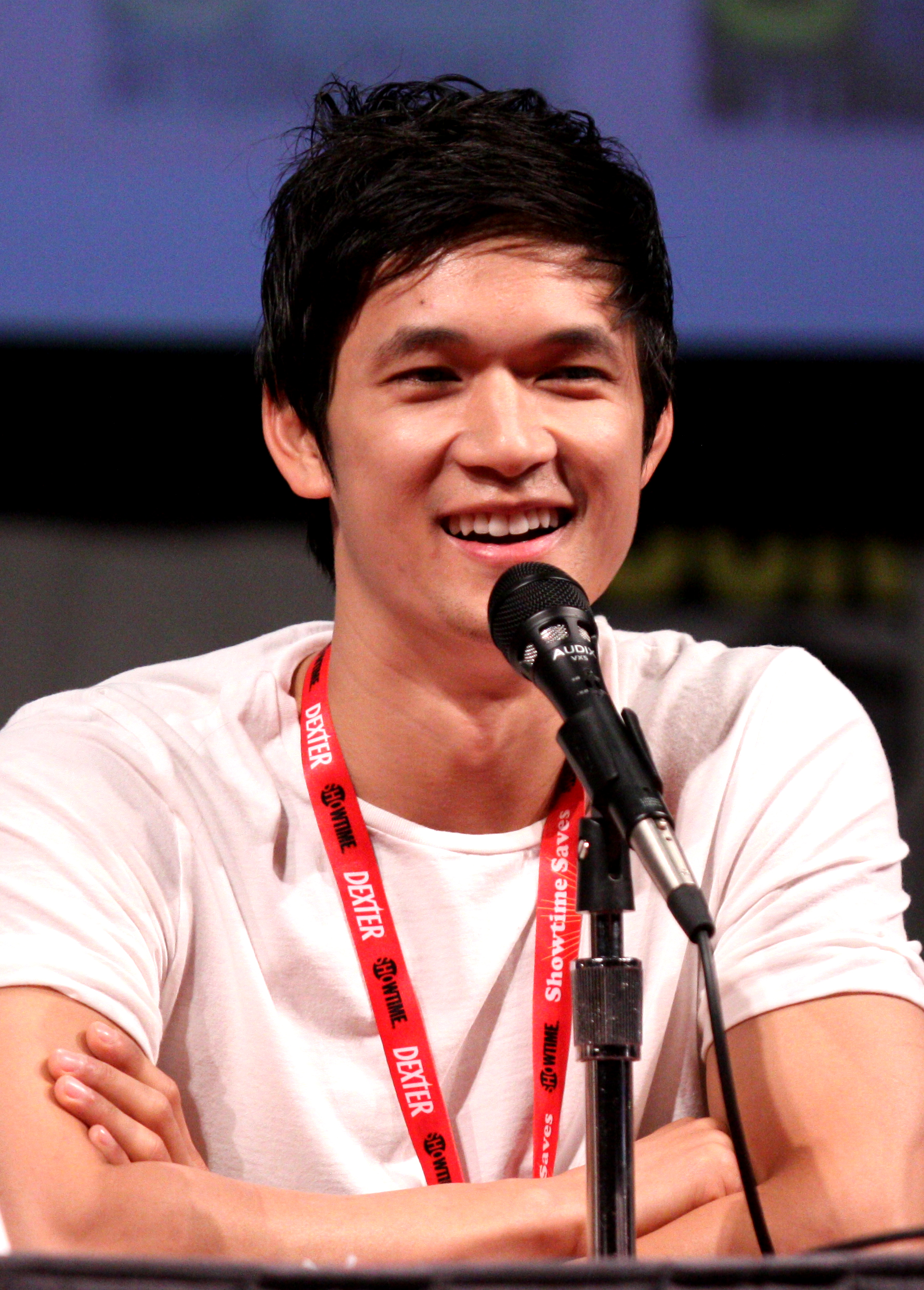
Harry Shum, Jr Asian-Costa Rican – Glee Actor/Dancer

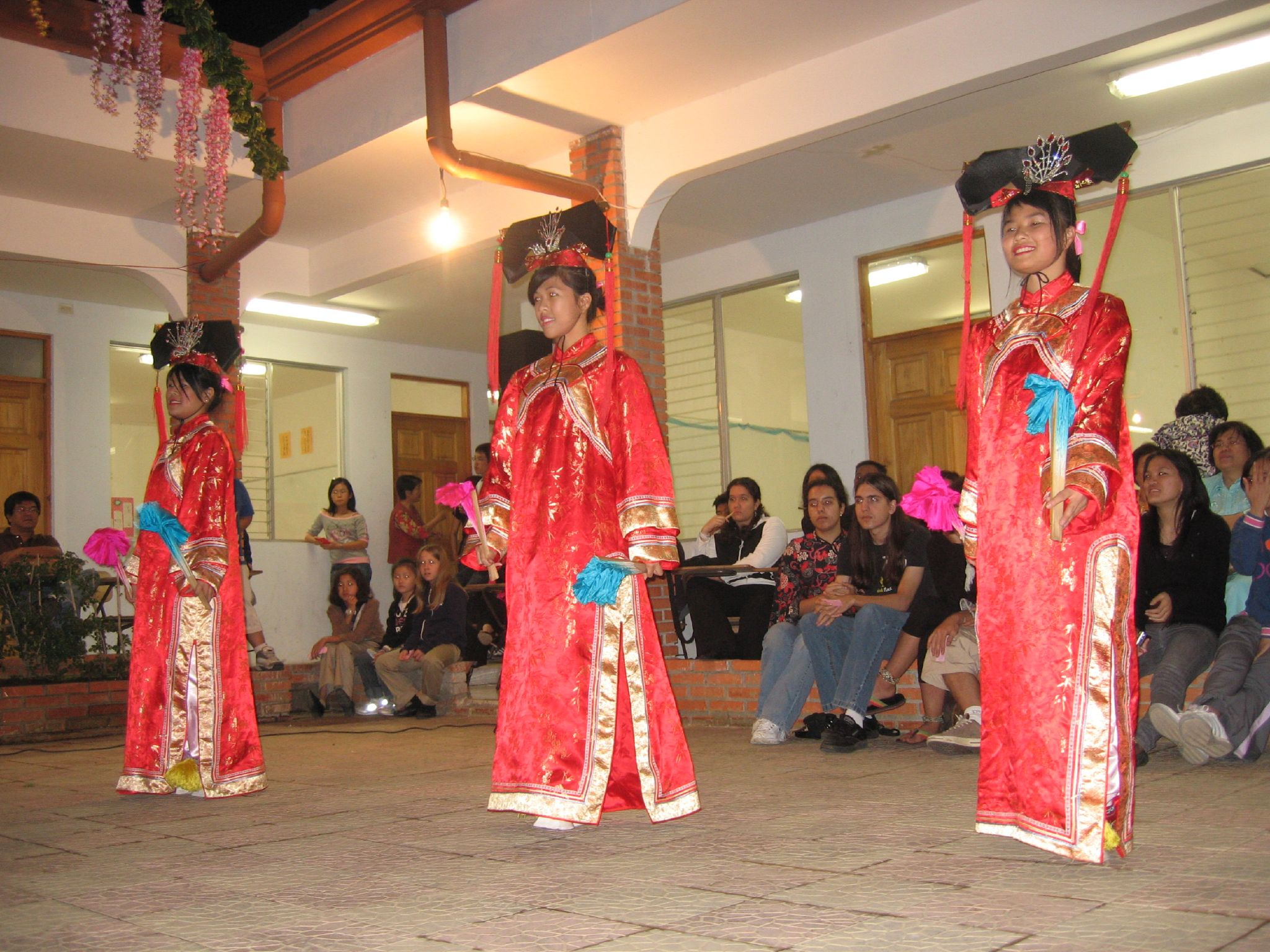
Celebration of the Chinese year in Costa Rica

Panama: Chinese-Panamanian population today presents 4% or 135,000. Ethnic Chinese in Panama, also variously referred to as Chinese-Panamanian, Panamanian-Chinese, Panama Chinese, or in Spanish as Chino-Panameño, are Panamanian citizens and residents of Chinese origin or descent.

Costa Rica: Today, Asians represent almost 1% of the Costa Rican population. the first Chinese people in Costa Rica migrants arrived in Costa Rica in 1855; they were a group of 77 originally from Guangzhou, who had come to Central America to work on the Panama Railway. Of them, 32 found work on the farm of José María Cañas, while the remaining 45 were hired by Alejandro Von Bulow, an agent sent by the Berlin Colonization Society to prepare suitable sites for German settlement in Costa Rica. During the 1859–1863 administration of José María Montealegre Fernández, laws were promulgated which prohibited the migration of blacks and Asians, in an effort to reserve Costa Rica for European settlers.

Early Chinese migrants typically arrived by sea through the Pacific coast port of Puntarenas; a "Chinese colony" began to form in the area, founded by José Chen Apuy, a migrant from Zhongshan, Guangdong who arrived in 1873. Puntarenas was so widely known among the Chinese community as a destination that some in China mistook it for the name of the whole country.

In the 1970s, Taiwan began to become a major source of Chinese immigration to Costa Rica. However, they formed a transitory group, with many using Costa Rica as a stopover while they waited for permission to settle in the United States or Canada. Those who settled permanently in Costa Rica included many pensioners enjoying their retirement abroad.

Most Chinese immigrants since then have been Cantonese, but in the last decades of the 20th century, a number of immigrants have also come from Taiwan and Japan. Many men came alone to work and married Costa Rican women and speak Cantonese. However the majority of the descendants of the first Chinese immigrants no longer speak Cantonese and feel themselves to be Costa Ricans.

Nicaragua: There are 12,000 Chinese Nicaraguans Chinese people first arrived in Nicaragua's Caribbean coast in the latter part of the 19th century, and most of them settled in cities such as Bluefields, El Bluff, Laguna de Perlas, and Puerto Cabezas. The Chinese immigrants dominated the commerce of the main coastal towns on the Caribbean coast prior to 1879. Then in the late 19th century, they began migrating to the Pacific lowlands of the country.

Country or territory with flag	% Local	Population	% Regional
Nicaragua	0.18%	12,000	
El Salvador	0.09%	6,240	
Guatemala	1.0%	138,000	
Honduras	1.0%	67,120	
Costa Rica	1%	60,000	
Panama	6%	160,000	
Total		576,290	1.21%

== Genetic composition table ==
Average genetic admixture
Country	European (%)	Amerindian (%)	African (%)
Costa Rica	61	30	9
Nicaragua	52	35	13
El Salvador	47	49	4
Guatemala	41	56	3
Panama	25	51	24
