= April 19 University Movement =

Nicaraguan anti-Ortega student movement

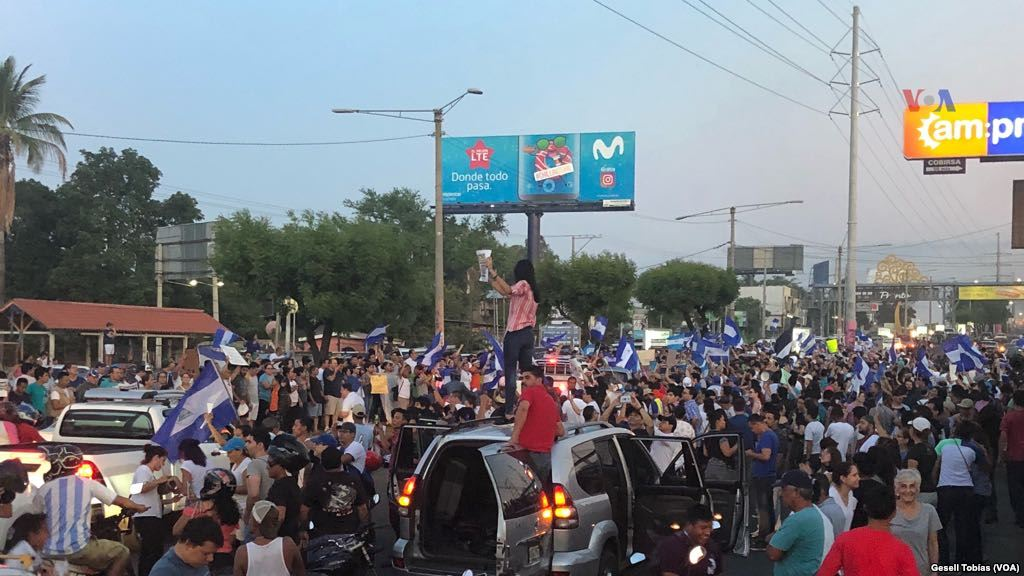
- Date: 25 April 2018
- Location: Nicaragua; Polytechnic University of Nicaragua (until 9 June 2018)
- Caused by: Police repression during the 2018–2020 Nicaraguan protests.; Existence of political prisoners in the country.; Demonstrators killed during the demonstrations.; Violation of human rights.

The April 19 University Movement (Spanish initials: MU19A) is a Nicaraguan student movement created on April 25, 2018 in Managua, Nicaragua. The student group opposes the government of Daniel Ortega who from 1979 to 1990 served as the country's first president following the Nicaraguan Revolution, was re-elected in 2006, and is the nation's current President. The April 19 University Movement organized and participated in the 2018–2020 Nicaraguan protests that began April 18th, 2018 in response to Social Security (INSS) reforms. The group has also served as spokesperson in national dialogue.

This student movement is considered a terrorist group by the Nicaraguan government as mentioned by the press: “The leaders [of the April 19th University Movement] are accused of crimes including murder, robbery, terrorism, kidnapping, trafficking, possession and use of restricted weapons, fires, torture, injuries, exposing people to danger.”

== Creation ==
In the April 25th, 2018 press conference of the Polytechnic University of Nicaragua (Spanish: Universidad Politécnica de Nicaragua, UPOLI), university students announced the creation of the April 19 University Movement which would serve as spokesperson for the dialogue with the government. During the press conference, they presented their demands to the government including the liberation of prisoners, annulment of criminal records, suspension of high-ranking officials of the National Police (including Aminta Granera and Francisco Díaz), guarantees of non-retaliation, and the reconstruction of university facilities. Moreover, they demanded the prosecution of those responsible for the deaths which have occurred due to the repression. There have been at least 481 deaths according to the Nicaraguan Association for Human Rights (ANPDH).

The Movement held President Daniel Ortega and Vice President/First Lady Rosario Murillo responsible “for any act that infringes upon ours and our families’ constitutional rights and guarantees.” The Movement invited the Episcopal Conference of Nicaragua to participate in the dialogue with the government and affirmed that from the UPOLI they would continue “resisting until the demands are met.”

Amaya Coppens one of the leaders of the movement was chosen as an International Woman of Courage in March 2020 by the US Secretary of State.
