= Valeska Sandoval =

Nicaraguan student

- Occupation: Student

Valeska Sandoval is a Nicaraguan university student. She was active in 2018 Nicaraguan protests who has been repeatedly captured by pro-government forces, including once during an assault by pro-government paramilitary groups captured live on Facebook.

== Nicaraguan protests ==
Originally from Ometepe Island. During the 2018 Nicaraguan protests against Daniel Ortega, since May, she remained entrenched in the National Autonomous University of Nicaragua (UNAN-Managua), when the campus was taken over by young protesters. In June, she was captured and tortured by pro-government vigilante groups, who sexually abused her and two of her university partners, before leaving them abandoned and without clothes on the outskirts of Managua. On 14 July, pro-government paramilitary groups attacked the university to dismantle the trenches. During the attack, Sandoval made a live broadcast on Facebook that went viral in which she said goodbye to her mother and affirmed her commitment to the democratization demands to the government.

Sandoval disappeared on 20 July, being threatened and imprisoned in El Chipote prison, where she remained for six days and was beaten and tortured by the police. She reported that in her cell they received only one plate of food, despite being three people in it. She was released on 25 July. In July 2020 she traveled to the United States to request asylum, but was deported by the Donald Trump administration.

On 24 April 2021, a person dressed in plainclothes was followed her in the Metrocentro Managua shopping mall, Managua, while she was shopping, and afterwards, while she was waiting for a taxi, a police officer took her hand and told her she was detained without offering explanation. A group of riot police arrived later, handcuffed her and took her away in a patrol car along with two other young men who she did not know nor what happened to them after seeing them in the vehicle. Sandoval was tortured again by police officers over the weekend, being beaten, kicked, waterboarded and tased. She was released again on 26 April.

== See also ==
- Amaya Coppens
