= Amaya Coppens =

Nicaraguan Belgian activist (born 1994)

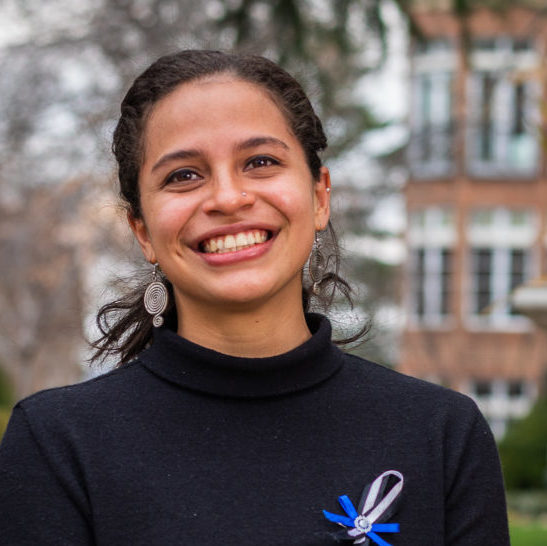
- Amaya in 2020
- Born: Amaya Eva Coppens Zamora; 1994 (age 31–32); Brussels
- Education: National Autonomous University of Nicaragua at León

Amaya Eva Coppens Zamora (born 1994) is a Belgian-born Nicaraguan student activist. She is a leading figure of the April 19 University Movement, founded during protests against the government of President Daniel Ortega. She was chosen as an International Woman of Courage in March 2020.

== Life ==
Coppens was born in Brussels in 1994. She was the daughter of Belgian sociologist Federico Coppens and Nicaraguan sociologist Tamara Zamora. Amaya Coppens lives and studies in Nicaragua. She completed the IB diploma at Li Po Chun United World College in Hong Kong. She studied medicine at the National Autonomous University of Nicaragua at León (UNAN-Leon).

She decides to join the protests against Daniel Ortega in 2018. She became one of the leaders of the April 19 University Movement.

She was accused of terrorism and aggravated robbery for having peacefully denounced the abuses of the regime. She was arrested twice, in April 2018 for having participated in demonstrations against the regime of the President, then in November 2019 for having brought aid to women who were supporting imprisoned opponents and who had started a hunger strike.

== Recognition ==
The Spanish newspaper El País recognised Coppens as the most influential person in South America. At a time of turmoil she was "a moral and political benchmark".

She was chosen as an International Woman of Courage in March 2020 by the United States Secretary of State.

== See also ==
- Valeska Sandoval
