= UNMA =

UNMA may refer to:

- Unified Network Management Architecture
- United Nations Mission in Angola
- Universidad Nacional Autónoma de México
- Universidad Nacional de Managua
- United Navodayan Malayalee Association
