= Polytechnic University of Nicaragua =

University in Managua, Nicaragua

Coordinates: 12.13703°N 86.21976°W

- Universidad Politécnica de Nicaragua (UPOLI)
- Motto: Sirviendo a la comunidad
- Motto in English: Serving the community
- Established: 1967
- Rector: Lidya Zamora PhD
- Students: 8,300
- Location: Managua, Nicaragua
- Website: unp.edu.ni

The Polytechnic University of Nicaragua (Spanish: Universidad Politecnica de Nicaragua, UPOLI) is a university in Managua, Nicaragua. It was founded in 1967.

== Organization ==
The university has six schools:

- School of Administration, Commerce and Finance
- School of Law
- School of Design
- School of Nursing
- School of Engineering
- Music Conservatory

== Online division ==
UPOLI International (Spanish: Universidad Politecnica de Nicaragua Internacional) is the online division. UPOLI International was established in 2013 by Tomás H. Téllez Ruiz, MSc., of the Polytechnic University of Nicaragua and Ricky M. Andrew, MBA.

== See also ==
- Education in Nicaragua
- List of universities in Nicaragua
