= National University of Engineering (Nicaragua) =

Public university in Managua, Nicaragua

Coordinates: 12.13182°N 86.26982°W

- Universidad Nacional de Ingeniería (UNI)
- Motto: Líder en Ciencia y Tecnología
- Motto in English: Leader in Science and Technology
- Type: Public
- Established: 1983
- Rector: Glenda Marcia Velasquez Vargas, MSc.
- Students: 5,360
- Location: Managua, Nicaragua
- Nickname: UNI
- Website: www.uni.edu.ni

The National University of Engineering (Spanish: Universidad Nacional de Ingeniería, UNI) is located in Managua, Nicaragua. It is acknowledged by its meticulous and selective admission system, through a high difficulty exam with top components of math and physics. The average acceptance rate is about 6% out of a pool of more than 2,000 applicants per year. This keeps the new students compromised permanently to the "highest exigency level" of excellency.

== History ==
On February 7, 1983, the Junta of National Reconstruction issued the Decree 1234 that founded the National University of Engineering (UNI). Previously, the engineering and architectural education in Nicaragua was located in the National Autonomous University of Nicaragua (UNAN) and the Universidad Centroamericana (UCA).

Today, the UNI is one of the most prestigious universities in Nicaragua, organized in six schools in three different campuses, offering eleven specialties.

Rigoberto López Pérez Building of the Simón Bolívar University Campus (RUSB)

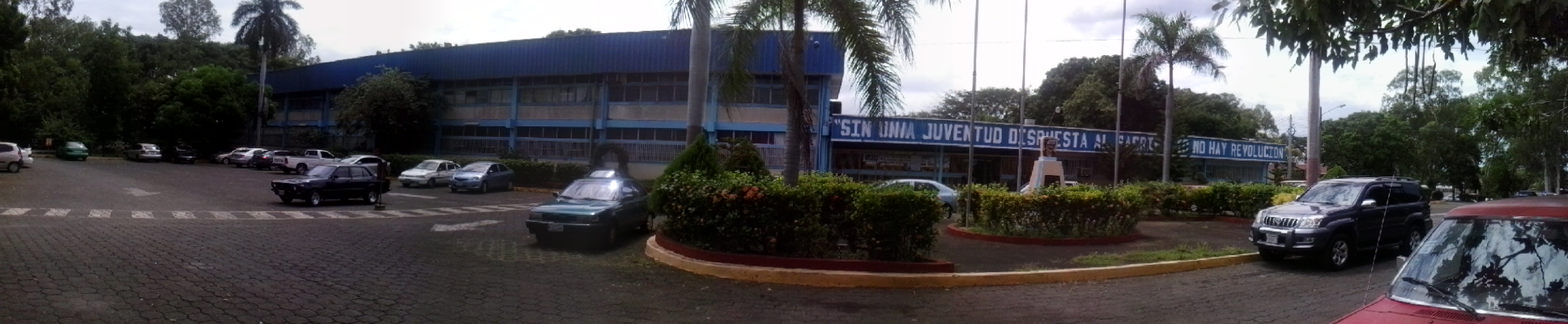
Pedro Araúz Palacios campus of the Universidad Nacional de Ingeniería in Managua, Nicaragua.
The legend at the main entrance reads Without youth willing to sacrifice, there is no revolution. A legacy from the Nicaraguan Revolution in the eighties.
