= Li Po Chun United World College =

IB world school in Hong Kong

Coordinates: 22°25′53″N 114°14′53″E

Li Po Chun United World College of Hong Kong

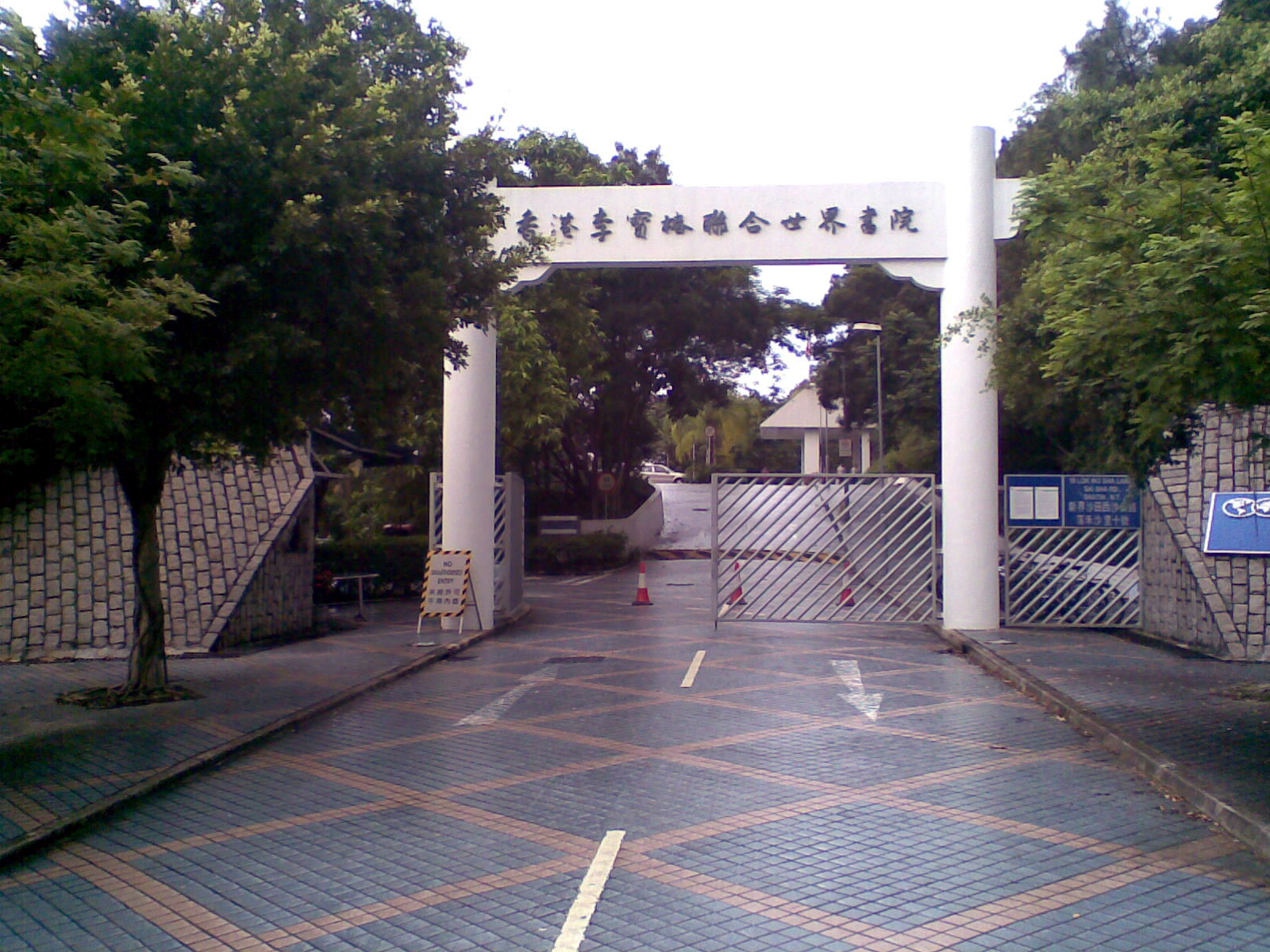

Location
- 10 Lok Wo Sha Lane, Sai Sha Road, Shatin, New Territories, Hong Kong; Wu Kai Sha; Hong Kong

Information
- Type: IB World School
- Established: 6 September 1992; 33 years ago
- Principal: Dr. Spencer A. Fowler
- Faculty: 29
- Enrollment: 258
- Tuition: Local student: HK$324,000; Overseas student: HK$428,000
- Affiliation: United World Colleges
- Website: Official website

Li Po Chun United World College
- Traditional Chinese: 香港李寶椿聯合世界書院
- Simplified Chinese: 香港李宝椿联合世界书院
- Literal meaning: Hong Kong Li Po Chun United World College
Transcriptions
Standard Mandarin
- Hanyu Pinyin: Xiānggǎng Lǐ Bǎochūn Liánhé Shìjiè Shūyuàn
Yue: Cantonese
- Jyutping: hoeng1 gong2 lei5 bou2 ceon1 lyun4 hap6 sai3 gaai3 syu1 jyun6*2

The Li Po Chun United World College of Hong Kong (LPCUWC, Chinese: 香港李寶椿聯合世界書院), established in 1992, is an International Baccalaureate boarding school in Wu Kai Sha, Hong Kong. It is the seventh member of the 18-member United World Colleges movement.

Li Po Chun United World College of Hong Kong is a subsidised school, from the Hong Kong Government's Direct Subsidy Scheme.

== History ==
Li Po Chun UWC was founded in 1978. Dr Lee Quo-Wei GMB JP, as the Chair of the UWC Hong Kong Selection Committee, initiated the idea of building a UWC college in Hong Kong with the help of Mr Li Shiu Tsang MBE JP, who set up the Li Po Chun Charitable Trust. The trust donated HK$100 million towards the construction of the college, while the Hong Kong government gifted a former mining site in Ma On Shan for use as the campus. With the support of Sir David Wilson, then Governor of Hong Kong, and the Principal of Atlantic College at the time, David Sutcliffe, the college was opened on 6 September 1992 by HRH the Prince of Wales, in his role as the president of the UWC movement.

In 2019, the school initiated a solar power system, installing 1,168 panels on campus and will use the revenue generated to provide need-based scholarship for students from grassroots families or developing countries.

Li Po Chun UWC was the first international boarding school, and one of the first International Baccalaureate schools, in Hong Kong.

== Admissions ==
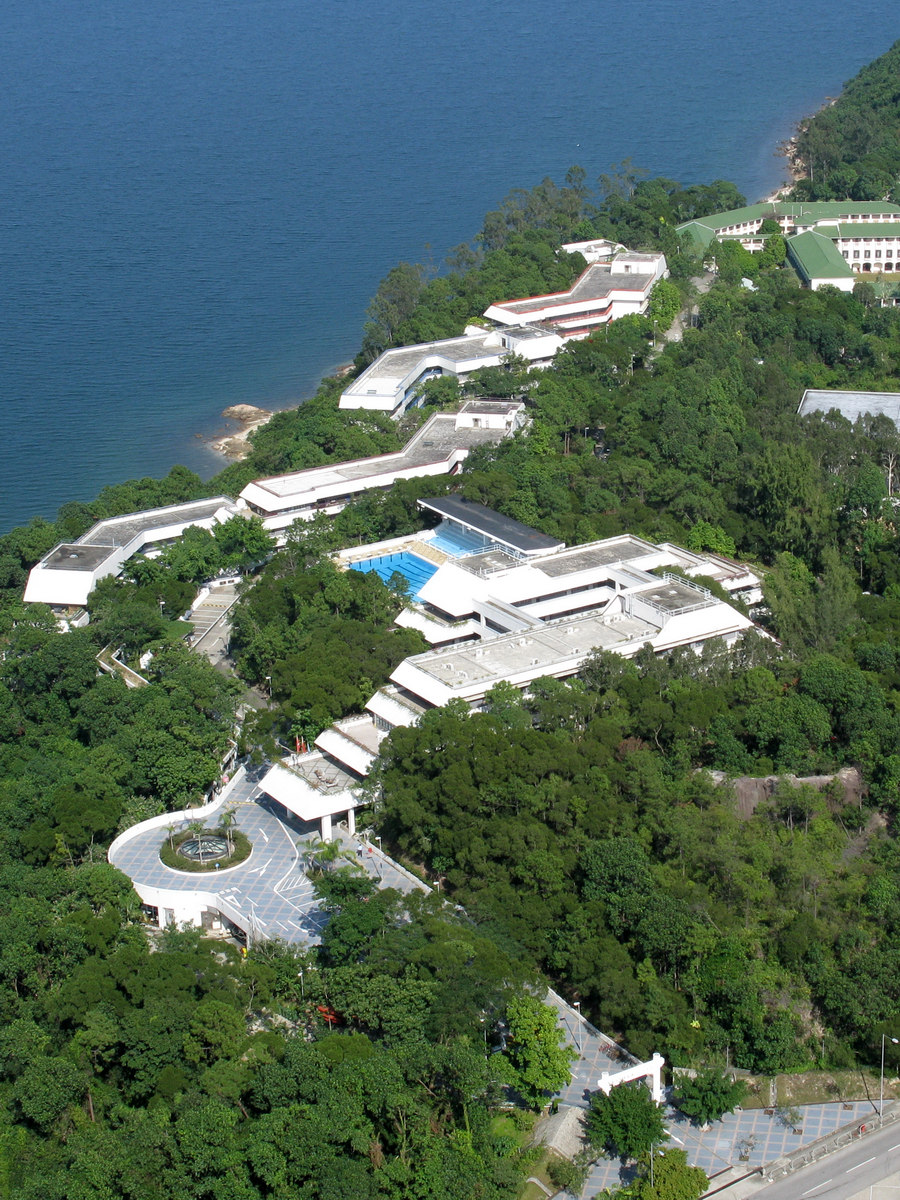
Aerial view of Li Po Chun UWC Campus

Li Po Chun UWC admits students from over 110 countries in addition to students from many local Hong Kong schools. The student body is made up of roughly 42% local and 58% overseas students. In the year 2025-2026, students coming from all 6 inhabited continents represented 90 countries in the world.

Students for all of the United World Colleges are selected by UWC National Committees or selection contacts in over 150 countries on merit, and many receive scholarships. Similar to students from overseas who are selected by the national selection committees of their home countries, local Hong Kong students are chosen by the UWC Hong Kong Committee.

The Hong Kong selection process has 3 rounds. The first short-listing is based on a written application composed of both short and long answer questions about the applicant's extracurricular and community service experience as well as the applicant's academic performance in the past two years, their recommendation form and their interest in UWC. At this stage, students are given the opportunity to rank their top 10 choices of college out of the 18 colleges. The shortlisted group of students is then invited to participate in the school's Challenge Day, a day camp consisting of group activities led by over 100 alumni, teachers and students, usually held in the winter. The final stage of the process is an individual interview with the Principal and a committee composed of an experienced UWC alumni and an external, independent interviewer. Out of the 300 or so Hong Kong students that apply every year, 50 are accepted to Li Po Chun UWC, with an additional 15 sent to other United World Colleges around the world, where they represent Hong Kong.

== Academics ==
Students at the College undertake a 2-year International Baccalaureate Diploma Program. In 2020, Li Po Chun UWC's IB diploma score averages at 36 points, compared to a 31.34 average worldwide. 28% of its graduates received 40 or more IB Diploma points, compared to the world average of 12.9% One graduate obtained the maximum of 45 points, with two students scoring 44 and six scoring 43.

Li Po Chun UWC offers the following subjects on the IBDP level:

Group 1: Studies in Language & Literature	Group 2: Language Acquisition	Group 3: Individuals & Societies	Group 4: Sciences	Group 5: Mathematics	Group 6: The Arts
Chinese	English	Business Management	Biology	Analysis & Approaches	Visual Arts
English	French	Economics	Chemistry	Applications & Interpretation	Theatre
Self-taught	Mandarin	Environmental Systems & Societies	Environmental Systems & Societies		
	Spanish	History	Physics		
		Geography	Marine Science (since 2025-2026 academic year)		
		Global Politics	Computer Science (since 2026-2027 academic year)		

== Experiential Learning ==
=== Quan Cai ===
The CAS (Creativity, Activity, Service) program is one of the three core elements of the International Baccalaureate Diploma Programme. Li Po Chun UWC's adaptation of this system is called the "Quan Cai" program ("全才" in Chinese, meaning "development of the whole person" ). The programme has 4 components, namely community service, creativity, activity, and campus service. A student is required to officially participate in at least 2 Quan Cai per year. Li Po Chun UWC offers more than 70 Quan Cai activities for students to participate in every year, including Initiative for Peace, Playback Theatre, Coral Monitoring, and Lion Dance.

=== Global Issues Forum ===
Within the academic timetable, which works on an 8-day cycle, the last block of day 8 is reserved for the Global Issues Forum. The entire student body and members of the staff gather to listen to a presentation on a global issue, given by fellow students, and then participate in an open discussion.

=== Cultural Evenings ===
Cultural evenings aim to promote international understanding and appreciation of diversity. There are six cultural evenings each year, starting with an International Cultural Evening prepared by second years for incoming first years as part of the orientation programme.

The Chinese Cultural Evening takes place every year, while the other evenings dedicated to other regional groups take place once every two years. In these student-led cultural evenings, students from the same geographic and cultural region come together to prepare a week of evening events that highlight their cultural characteristics, and a dinner of regional cuisines.

=== Project Week ===
Annual project weeks enable students to lead and work on projects in East, South, and Southeast Asia. Some recent projects have included Helping rehabilitate a tsunami-struck school in Sri Lanka, performing plays for children in Bangkok, working with children at the Christina Noble Children's Foundation in Ho Chi Minh City, and travelling to North Korea, and working in several children's orphanages run by the Happy Tree Organisation in Phnom Penh, Cambodia.

Some students stay in Hong Kong, where they work with local organizations or undertake a 150km hike across the New Territories without access to technology.

== Boarding and Pastoral Care ==
All students attending the school, including those from Hong Kong, are required to board. The full student body of approximately 250 students live in 4 residential blocks, sharing rooms of four students, each representing four different nationalities. The full-time teaching faculty reside on campus, where they serve as tutors alongside their teaching duties. The school's support staff includes 2 part-time school counselors and 2 school nurses. Additionally, second-year students receive training in mental health to assist their peers.

== Graduates ==
Many graduates enroll in top universities around the world, with most students earning or qualifying for significant scholarships. In 2025, 43% of Li Po Chun UWC graduates go on to study in the United States, 11% in the United Kingdom, 13% in Hong Kong, 6% in Canada, 11% in Europe. Others choose to pursue "3rd year options" which can range from service to travelling, while others go straight into the workforce or return to their home countries for a gap year.

Recent university destinations include Yale University, Brown University, Columbia University, Cornell University, Wellesley College, University of Oxford, University of Cambridge, Sciences Po, University of Toronto etc.

== Notable alumni ==
- Asim Butt (1978-2010 ) - Painter and sculptor
- Niki Ashton (1982- ) - Canadian politician
- Dominic Lee 李梓敬 (1984- ) - Hong Kong Legislative Council Member
- Edward Leung Hei 梁熙 (1985- ) - Hong Kong Legislative Council Member
- Elim Chan 陳以琳 (1986- ) - Hong Kong music conductor
- Amaya Coppens (1994- ) - Nicaraguan and Belgian woman human rights activist

== List of principals ==
- David Wilkinson (1992-1994)
- Blair Forster (1994-2003)
- Stephen Codrington (2004-2011)
- Arnett Edwards (2011–2023)
- Dr. Spencer A. Fowler (2023 - )

== Controversy ==
In May 2018, Li Po Chun UWC announced a HK$50 million donation from Dr. Lee Shau Kee for the development of a Belt and Road Resources Center on campus, scheduled for an opening in Fall 2019. The proposed centre aimed to provide a space for secondary school students across Hong Kong to interact with international students from Belt and Road countries, such as Cambodia, Malaysia, the Philippines and Thailand.

In Dec 2018, students at Li Po Chun UWC launched a petition asking the college to rename the center, fearing that the name Belt and Road Resources Center would compromise the college's political impartiality by siding with China's premier foreign policy. Speculation of the college's political influence stemmed from the open support of Chief Executive Carrie Lam on the college's mission to improve knowledge exchange between Belt and Road countries at the LPCUWC education symposium held in February 2018.

The name of the center has since then been changed to Lee Shau Kee Peace Education Centre, designed by M Moser and Associates.

== See also ==
- United World Colleges
- International Baccalaureate
- Education in Hong Kong
