= National Autonomous University of Nicaragua at León =

Coordinates: 12.4368°N 86.8791°W

- Motto: A la libertad por la universidad Traditional motto: Sic Itur ad Astra (The way to the stars)
- Type: Public
- Established: 1680; 1812; 214 years ago
- Rector: Almarina Solís Santos
- Students: 49,014 (2024)
- Location: León, Nicaragua
- Website: https://www.unanleon.edu.ni/

The National Autonomous University of Nicaragua at León (Spanish: Universidad Nacional Autónoma de Nicaragua-León, UNAN-León) is a state-funded public university of Nicaragua. UNAN-León is the oldest university in the country, established in 1812.

== History ==
UNAN-León has its roots in the Tridentine Seminary College of Saint Raymond (Spanish: Colegio Seminario Tridentino de San Ramón), established in the city of León in 1680 by Andrés de las Navas y Quevedo, O. de M., a friar of the Mercedarian Order who was the Bishop of Nicaragua. He did this upon his appointment to the leadership of that diocese in keeping with the requirements established by the Council of Trent for the training of the clergy of the Catholic Church.

In 1812, UNAN-León became the second university in Central America and the last one established during the end of the Spanish colony on the continent of America.

By government decree in 1983, the campus of the National Autonomous University of Nicaragua in León and Managua, became two separate entities: UNAN and UNAN-León. The original curriculum consisted of Civil law, Canon law and medicine.

== Gallery ==
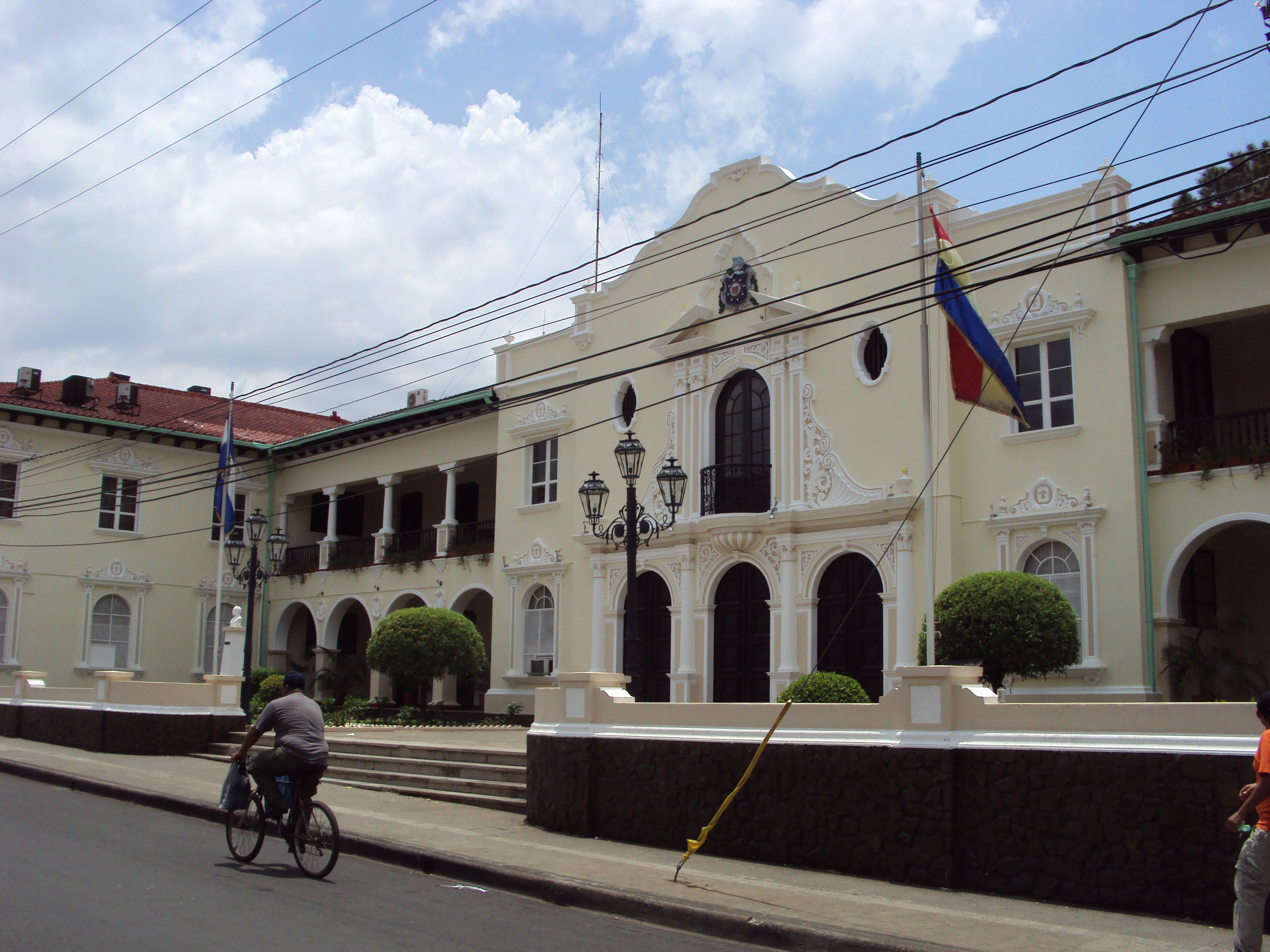
Building of the National Autonomous University of Nicaragua in León.

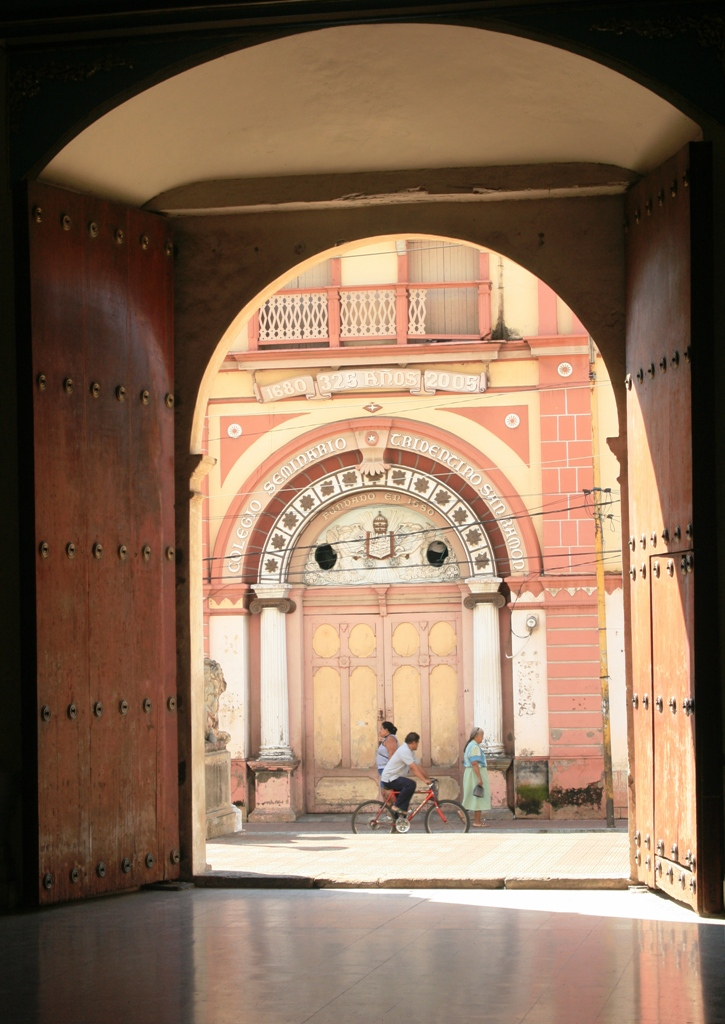
Tridentine Seminary College of Saint Raymond in León, Nicaragua. View from inside the Cathedral of León.

== See also ==
- Education in Nicaragua
- List of universities in Nicaragua
- List of colonial universities in Latin America
