= Eleanor Blackmore =

British missionary and missionary nurse (1873–1943)

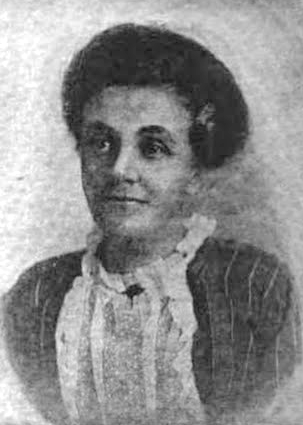
- Eleanor Blackmore, from a 1916 publication
- Born: Eleanor Maud Blackmore; 17 April 1873; Havant, Hampshire, UKGBI
- Died: 25 August 1943 (aged 70); Poole, Dorset, UK
- Occupations: Missionary; missionary nurse

Eleanor Blackmore (17 April 1873 – 25 August 1943) was a British Baptist missionary and missionary nurse based in Nicaragua. In 1917, Blackmore founded the present-day Colegio Bautista de Managua and co-founded the First Baptist Church of Managua.

== Early life ==
Eleanor Maud Blackmore born in Havant, Hampshire on 17 April 1873 to William Blackmore, a linen draper and Maria Blackmore.

Blackmore was educated at a private boarding school. Blackmore later studied at the Baptist Deaconess Home in Chester for two years, whilst also undertaking a course in nursing.

== Career ==
Previous to her work in Nicaragua, Blackmore worked in Grand Cayman, Cayman Islands. In either 1902 or 1903, Blackmore relocated to Costa Rica in order to assist during a yellow fever outbreak, and nearly died when she contracted the illness herself.

In 1903, Blackmore became affiliated with the Central American Mission (CAM) in Nicaragua. In 1911, Blackmore began working with several Baptist missionaries across Nicaragua.

=== Woman's American Baptist Home Mission Society ===
In April 1916, Blackmore was commissioned by the Woman's American Baptist Home Mission Society as the society's first general missionary in Nicaragua.

In 1917, Blackmore founded a Baptist school in Managua (present-day Colegio Bautista de Managua). The same year Blackmore and José Mendoza co-founded the First Baptist Church of Managua.

In 1924, Blackmore helped to lead revival meetings throughout Nicaragua alongside Roberto Valenzuela Elphick and Henry Strachan, the co-director of the director of the Latin America Mission (LAM). Her reports from the field often described intense opposition from Roman Catholic leaders and their parishioners, noting, "I am not a pessimist or I would not have stuck at this field for 26 years."

In 1920, she spoke at a convention in Pittsburgh, Pennsylvania. Blackmore retired from the mission field in 1938, and returned to England.

== Personal life and legacy ==
Blackmore died on 25 August 1943 in Poole, Dorset (Note: Also cited as Wellington, Somerset.) aged 70.
