= German Nicaraguans =

Germano-nicaragüense, Deutsch-Nicaraguaner
- (Germany) (Nicaragua)

Languages
- Spanish and German

Religion
- Roman Catholicism and Lutheranism

Related ethnic groups
- German people

German Nicaraguans are Nicaraguans with German ancestry, or German-born naturalized citizens of Nicaragua. This includes Poles due to the Partitions of Poland and Sudeten Germans from present Czech Republic. During the Second World War, after Nicaragua's allies declared war on Germany, German immigrants not naturalized were persecuted and imprisoned. Some were deported to Germany or to concentration camps in other countries. Although Germans have emigrated to Nicaragua since the 19th century, most of the German Nicaraguans still speak both Spanish and German.

== History ==
=== Early immigrants ===
The first German who settled in Nicaragua was a merchant of León in 1810, known as "Don Alemán" (Don German) or as Orlando W. Roberts, (his real German name was not mentioned). In 1852, a group of German immigrants, primarily single men, began to settle in northern Nicaragua with the purpose of cultivating 200 blocks of land per person, which were granted by the Nicaraguan government. They were required to cultivate the land and have an initial capital equivalent to about $2,500 per person. Over time, these settlers built farms, established towns and increased the wealth of Nicaragua. North Nicaragua became the epicenter of this economic prosperity. The next settlement upstream, Castillo Viejo (Old Castle), likely had a number of German settlers by the year 1852. Germans continued to arrive on ships at Granada and rode out to areas where they would soon establish settlements. Other immigrants came to Leon and began their journey to Matagalpa. Many of the Germans who moved to Costa Rica in 1853 had come to Nicaragua with the emigrant ship Antoinette.

=== During World War II ===
At the beginning of World War II in 1939, Nicaragua's allies - France and the United Kingdom - declared war on Germany. The Government of Nicaragua prompted a wave of persecution against the Germans in Nicaragua. During this period, fifty young men of German descent were attacked in La vaterland. They were those who had been encouraged to farm coffee plantations by the 'Thirty Years' Conservative governments (1857-1892) and then by the Liberal government of José Santos Zelaya (1893-1909). To promote the cultivation of coffee he donated 80 hectares (200 acres) of land in the wilderness areas of Matagalpa and Jinotega. These Germans were the ones who started the promotion, production, processing, transportation and marketing of coffee in northern Nicaragua.

The president of Nicaragua, Anastasio Somoza Garcia declared war against Germany in 1941, and the Germans in Nicaragua were victims of this European war. Somoza began "hunting" Germans to imprison them. The older people were arrested and the younger were taken to the Quinta Eitzen, a property which Somoza had seized from the German Ulrich Eitzen. Once imprisoned they were not given food.

Only Germans who were naturalized Nicaraguans were not imprisoned or were released from the jail. However, some Germans were deported to Germany. Some German groups from Nicaragua were in refugee camps in other countries but once the war and the German persecution started, some returned to Nicaragua. Some groups of German (and other ethnic groups) were deported to concentration camps in the United States from Nicaragua. Those who refused to be deported were confined on Ellis Island, a small island in New York, used as a quarantine site for immigrants.

== Demography ==
The descendants of those Germans today live in the mountains, in fincas, as did their ancestors. Most of them can still speak both Spanish and German. Many German Nicaraguans speak additional languages including English and French. They maintain the use of elements of German culture such as the use of fireplaces in their homes, which are unusual in Hispanic America. The German Nicaraguans have their own school in Managua, Nicaragua.

=== German Festivals in Nicaragua ===
The German Culture Festival in Nicaragua is celebrated between 4 and 15 June. As part of this festival, there are events celebrating gastronomy, cinema, philosophy and musical heritage. All the events are free to attend, except for the Grand Concert "Germany in the heart of Nicaragua", held at the córdobas Ruben Dario National Theater.

== See also ==
- German Nicaraguan School
