= University of Commercial Sciences =

Nicaraguan Uni

Coordinates: 12.12320°N 86.25246°W

- Universidad de Ciencias Comerciales (UCC)
- Motto: Gente que triunfa
- Motto in English: People who succeed
- Type: Private
- Established: 1964
- Affiliations: AUPRICA
- Rector: Gilberto Bergman Padilla
- Location: Managua, Nicaragua
- Nickname: UCC
- Website: ucc.edu.ni

The University of Commercial Sciences (Spanish: Universidad de Ciencias Comerciales) (UCC), is a private university located in Managua, Nicaragua which was founded in 1964.

== History ==
In 1964, Carlos Narváez Moreira founded the Institute of Commercial Sciences, which later became the Center of Commercial Sciences, offering a technical degree in Accountancy and Finance. In the following years the academic offering was expanded to include courses in Senior Technical Executive Secretariat, Business Executive, Public Relations Executive and Marketing and Advertising.

On April 3, 1997, the National University Council changed the classification of the UCC from a Superior Technical Education Center to a university.
