= Nicaraguan University of Science and Technology =

Coordinates: 12.13602°N 86.22924°W

Universidad Nicaragüense de Ciencia y Tecnologia (UCYT)
- Universidad Nicaragüense de Ciencia y Tecnologia (UCYT)
- Motto: Decidí tu futuro
- Motto in English: Decide your future
- Type: Private
- Established: 2002
- Location: Managua, Nicaragua
- Nickname: UCYT
- Website: www.ucyt.edu.ni

The Universidad Nicaragüense de Ciencia y Tecnologia (UCYT) is a private university in Managua, Nicaragua, founded in 2002.
