= Panchimalco =

- District

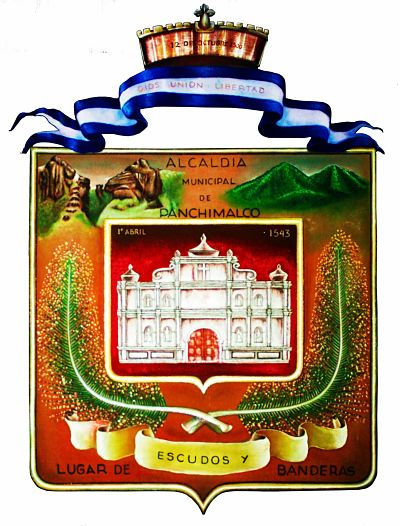
- Seal

- Location in El Salvador
- Coordinates: 13°37′N 89°11′W
- Country: El Salvador
- Department: San Salvador Department

Area
  - Total: 35 sq mi (90 km^{2})
- Elevation: 1,870 ft (570 m)

Population (2007)
  - Total: 41,260

Panchimalco is a town in the San Salvador department of El Salvador.

Panchimalco ("The Place of Flags and Shields," from the Nahuatl, "Pantli," meaning banner or flag; "Chimalli," meaning shield or herald, and "co," place) Its 35,000 inhabitants, sometimes called "Panchos," are descendants of Nahua Indians fleeing the Spanish takeover of San Salvador during the 16th century, into areas originally inhabited by Mayan and Nahuatl peoples.

== Indigenous people ==
Panchimalco is known for its indigenous population and its festivities. Together with Izalco, Panchimalco is considered one of the last two remaining bastions of Amerindian peoples in El Salvador. Villagers still weave and wear colorful native textiles and maintain many indigenous traditions. However, the native language is not one of them. As of the last few years, no Nahuatl speakers remain in Panchimalco. Amerindians comprised 51.6 percent of the Salvadoran population in the 1769-1798 census, but at current time they are numbered at less than 100,000 in all of El Salvador. The number was greatly reduced when forces loyal to Gen. Maximiliano Hernandez massacred up to 30,000 peasants during the Salvadoran peasant uprising of 1932 known as La Matanza.

== History ==
Panchimalco was founded by the pre-Columbian Toltec people who may have emigrated to the area following the fall of their empire in Tabasco in what is now Mexico. During the Spanish conquest of the territory, the area was called "El Fuerte" (the fortress) because of the concave shape of the land that gave the indigenous population an advantage.

The Spanish established Panchimalco as a village, and built its famous colonial church, one of the most important historical monuments in El Salvador. Its original construction date, circa 1725, make it the oldest surviving colonial structure in El Salvador. The church, consecrated to the Holy Cross of Rome, and bearing that name (Santa Cruz de Roma), has been damaged in the various earthquakes that have shaken El Salvador through the centuries, beginning with one registered in 1736. The church consists of a single nave covered by a roof supported by 16 wooden beams. It contains an altar reredos done in the French baroque style, but its most well-known feature is its bleached white colonial façade. Like many colonial churches, it fronts a central square centered on a large cypress tree. The clay floor is not original, but marks a restoration completed in 1970. The church was declared a national historic monument by the Salvadoran congress on February 27, 1975.

The hurricane of early June 1934 caused some 54 deaths in Panchimalco.

== Culture ==
The festivities held in Panchimalco are colorful and religious in nature. The Flower & Fronds Fair (Feria de las Flores y Palmas) celebrates the Virgin Mary devotion of the local Catholic church. The cofradías or "co-fraternities" are civic organizations in support of different church festivals, and they organize the various carnivals and celebrations. The procession of the Holy Cross of Rome is the town's official patronal festival. The dance of the Moors and Christians is an odd vestige of a tradition brought over by the Spaniards, which celebrates a Spanish victory over Muslim invaders during the Reconquista.

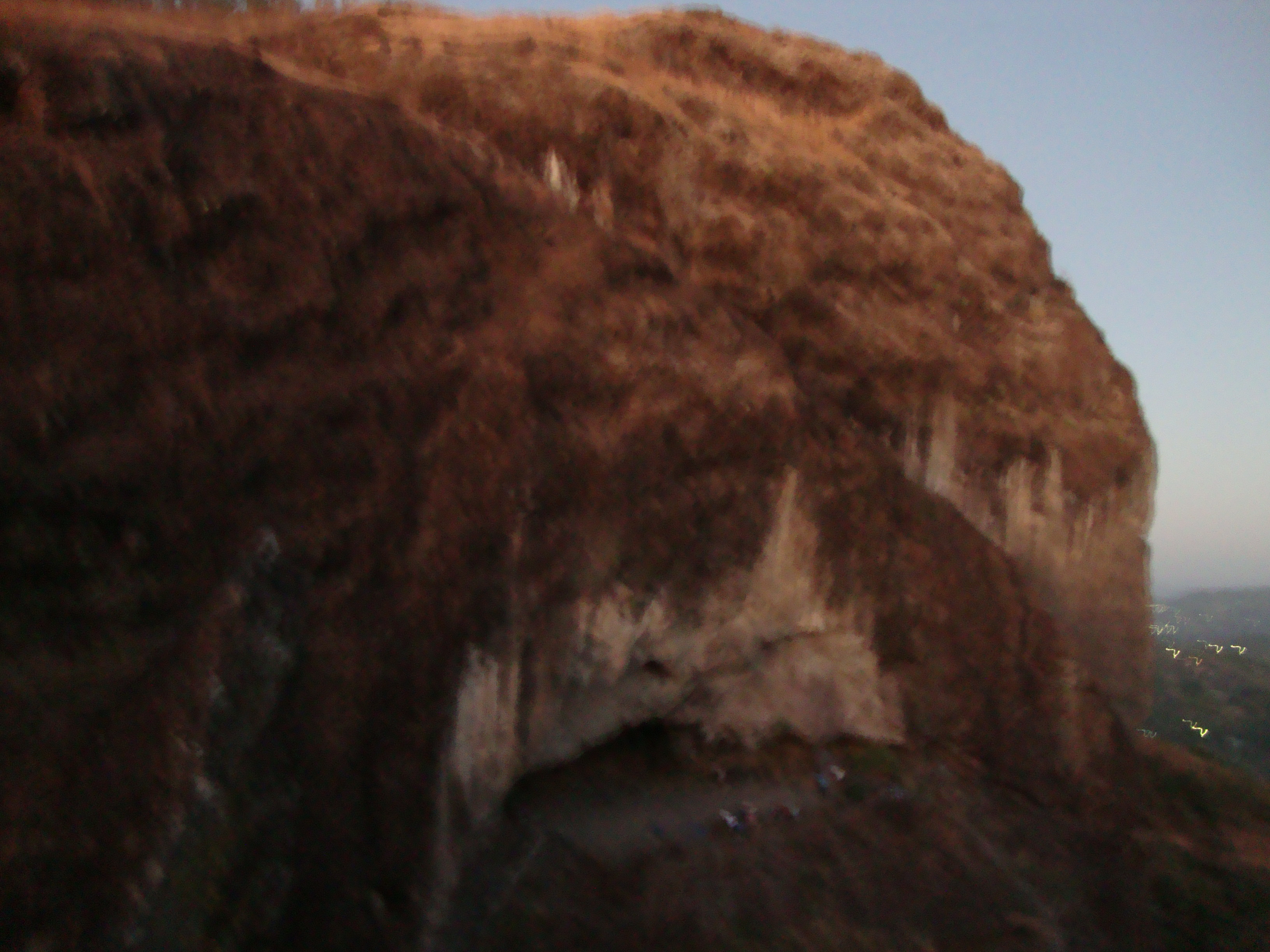
Puerta Del Diablo.

Nearby attractions include the town of Los Planes de Renderos, a lookout post where there are views of San Salvador and the valley; the "Puerta del Diablo" (Devil's Gate) rock formation and Balboa Park, a green retreat also overlooking San Salvador. All three are located within a municipal zone also called Panchimalco, though locals interpret Panchimalco to mean only the historic old town. The Panchimalco zone comprises 14 hamlets or cantons: El Divisadero, Pajales, Panchimalquito, Las Crucitas, San Isidro, Los Troncones, Azacualpa, Amayón, Los Palones, Los Planes de Renderos, el Guayabo, El Cedro, Quezalapa, Loma and Media.

Panchimalco was named as among the ten top tourist sites in El Salvador by the Confederation of Latin American Tourist Organizations.
