= German Nicaraguan School =

- Colegio Alemán Nicaragüense / Deutsche Schule Managua

Location
- Km 10.5 Carretera Sur, 800m west Managua; Nicaragua; 12.086732675792836°N 86.32872471764601°W

Information
- Type: Private, German international school
- Established: October 18, 1934 (founding association); December 1, 1967 (school refounded)
- Grades: Kindergarten – Grade 12 / IB Diploma
- Language: German, Spanish, English
- Affiliation: International Baccalaureate World School; recognised German School Abroad (Deutsche Auslandsschule)
- Website: dsm.edu.ni

The German Nicaraguan School (Colegio Alemán Nicaragüense; Deutsche Schule Managua), abbreviated DSM, is a private, trilingual German international school in Managua, Nicaragua. It is officially recognised by the German federal government as a Deutsche Auslandsschule (German School Abroad) and is a member of the International Baccalaureate World School network. The school teaches in German, Spanish and English and enrols more than 900 students from Kindergarten through the final year of secondary school.

== History ==
The idea of founding a German school in Managua dates to 1934, when local supporters established the Asociación Pro Escuela (Pro-School Association) on 18 October 1934; the association was registered with and recognised by the Nicaraguan authorities. In 1936 the school also received recognition from the German government of the time, including a one-time subsidy from the German Ministry of Foreign Affairs. The project was interrupted by World War II, and it was not revived until 1 December 1967, a date the school now observes as its official founding day.

Classes began in August 1968, when a German-language Kindergarten opened under teacher Ursula Pook in a rented country house at kilometre 13½ of Carretera Sur, opposite the Iglesia Monte Tabor. About half of the children enrolled in that first Kindergarten class were Nicaraguan, alongside German, Swiss, American, British and French pupils. After renting the property for two years, the school moved to its current site at kilometre 10½ of Carretera Sur.

Construction of the new campus began in 1972; the buildings were undamaged by the earthquake of 23 December 1972, and the school became the first in Managua to resume classes after the disaster. The primary school was fully established by 1975 and secondary education was added in 1976, with the first cohort completing the Bachillerato in 1981. As of 2026, the school counts more than 900 bachilleres (graduates) across more than 40 graduating classes.

== Curriculum ==
The DSM offers a trilingual and bicultural education in German, Spanish and English from Kindergarten onward. German is introduced from Kindergarten and deepened throughout schooling, allowing students to work toward the Deutsches Sprachdiplom (DSD). In the upper secondary years, the school offers the German International Abitur (GIB) and the IB Diploma Programme as part of its status as an IB World School. The school describes its stages as Maternal/Kindergarten, Primaria (primary), Secundaria (secondary) and IB/GIB (upper secondary).

=== International Baccalaureate and GIB ===
In grades 11 and 12, students may enrol in the IB Diploma Programme or in its German-language variant, the German International Abitur (GIB, Deutsches Internationales Abitur), reflecting the school's dual status as an IB World School and a recognised German School Abroad. As at other IB World Schools, the diploma programme is built around three core components — the extended essay, Theory of Knowledge, and Creativity, Activity and Service (CAS) — alongside subject coursework, intended to develop research, self-management, communication and intercultural skills. The standard IB Diploma gives students access to universities worldwide, while the GIB Diploma additionally grants direct admission to German and other European universities, in line with language and academic requirements set by Germany's Standing Conference of the Ministers of Education and Cultural Affairs (Kultusministerkonferenz, KMK).

== School life and affiliated organisations ==
The school hosts extracurricular activities, a school calendar of events, a parents' school ("Escuela para padres"), student counselling services and a school exchange programme, among others. It is linked to the Centro Cultural Alemán (German Cultural Centre, CCA), a non-profit association that promotes cultural and social ties between Germany and Nicaragua, as well as to the Iniciativa Cultural Alemana Nicaragüense (ICAN) and the Deutscher Sport Club (DSC), a German sports club.

== Location ==
The school is located at kilometre 10.5 of Carretera Sur, 800 metres west Alexander von Humboldt St., in Managua, Nicaragua.

== See also ==
- List of German international schools
- Education in Nicaragua
