= Instituto Loyola =

Coordinates: 12°9′10.77″N 86°15′56.55″W

- North Side Santo Domingo Church; Managua; Nicaragua

Information
- Type: Private Catholic Coeducational Primary and Secondary education institution
- Religious affiliation(s): Roman Catholic (Jesuit)
- Established: 1946; 79 years ago
- Rector: Jose Domingo Cuesta, SJ
- Director: Fidel Sancho Bratos, SJ
- Faculty: 78
- Grades: Elementary and high school
- Gender: Coeducational
- Enrollment: 1522
- Affiliations: Association of Jesuit Schools of Central America (ACO SICA M)
- Website: LoyolaManagua

Instituto Loyola is a private Catholic coeducational elementary and secondary education institution run by the Society of Jesus in Managua, Nicaragua. It was founded by the Jesuits in 1946 as an all-boys elementary school. It accepts students of other faiths who attend the programmed religious activities. The school shares the mission of the Society of Jesus, "the service of faith and promotion of justice."

== History ==
Loyola School was founded in 1946 as an extension of the social and educational works of the Santo Domingo parish which already had schools of religion and of dressmaking. In 1952 the night school opened. The boys' school had about 550 day students and the night school about 440 mixed students of different ages.

In 1964 the entire block north of Santo Domingo was purchased for a new building completed in 1971. The 1972 Nicaragua earthquake devastated the area, but the new school remained intact. Classes opened in 1973 under the new name Instituto Loyola, which now included secondary school, the first Jesuit secondary school in Central America to admit girls. This came about through the reduction of the local population and consequent closing of the night school after the earthquake. In 1979 the school began operating in two shifts: morning elementary and afternoon secondary. The same year the Sandinistas assumed power. State subsidies diminished, and ended in 1993. The school is an active member of ACOSICAM (Association of Schools of the Society of Jesus in Central America) and FLACSI (Latin American Federation of the Society of Jesus).

== Programs ==
English is taught and there are technology and science laboratories. Sponsored sports include rama sports, football, basketball, track and field, and volleyball. Loyola offers an open, four-day science camp for 6th to 8th graders.

Instituto Loyola has for years hosted students from Jesuit Prep Dallas for summer service projects. DeSmet Jesuit High School in St. Louis has also sent students.

== See also ==
- List of Jesuit schools
