= National Agrarian University (Nicaragua) =

Coordinates: 12.14874°N 86.16135°W

- Universidad Nacional Agraria (UNA)
- Motto: Por un desarrollo agrario integral y sostenible
- Motto in English: For a comprehensive and sustainable agricultural development
- Type: Public
- Established: 1917
- Rector: Telémaco Talavera Siles
- Location: Managua, Nicaragua
- Nickname: UNA
- Website: www.una.edu.ni

The National Agrarian University (Spanish: Universidad Nacional Agraria, UNA) is a public university in Managua, Nicaragua.

The National Agrarian University has its roots in the National School of Agriculture (Spanish: Escuela Nacional de Agricultura), established on May 25, 1917. It was incorporated in 1986, by presidential decree, into the National Autonomous University of Nicaragua as the Institute of Agricultural Sciences (ISCA).

In 1990, the ISCA faculty at the National University became an independent entity; the National Agrarian University, with four faculties:

- Faculty of Agronomy (FAGRO)
- Faculty of Natural Resources and Environment (FARENA)
- Faculty of Distance Education and Rural Development (FED-DR)
- Faculty of Animal Science (FACA)
