= Popular University of Nicaragua =

Coordinates: 12.12812°N 86.22946°W

- Universidad Popular de Nicaragua (UPONIC)
- Motto: Universidad es comunidad
- Motto in English: University is community
- Type: Private
- Established: 1992
- Rector: Olga Soza Bravo
- Location: Managua, Nicaragua
- Nickname: UPONIC
- Website: www.uponic.edu.ni

The Popular University of Nicaragua (Spanish: Universidad Popular de Nicaragua (UPONIC)) is a private university located in Managua, Nicaragua, founded in 1992.

== Faculties ==
- Faculty of Economics
- Faculty of Educational Sciences
- Faculty of Law and Political Sciences
- Faculty of Natural Medicine
- Faculty of Engineering
- Faculty of Informatics
- Faculty of Agricultural Sciences
