= National Autonomous University of Nicaragua =

Public university in Nicaragua

Coordinates: 12.1056°N 86.2737°W

- Universidad Nacional Autónoma de Nicaragua
- Motto: A la libertad por la universidad
- Type: Public
- Established: 1812; 214 years ago
- Rector: Octavio Guevara
- Administrative staff: 709
- Students: 24,629
- Postgraduates: 1,283
- Location: Managua, Nicaragua
- Website: www.unan.edu.ni/

The National Autonomous University of Nicaragua (Spanish: Universidad Nacional Autónoma de Nicaragua, UNAN) is a public university in Nicaragua. Its main campus is located in Managua. The original campus, UNAN-Leon, is located in León and is now mainly used for medicine majors.

== 2018–2020 Nicaraguan protests ==
UNAN was the site of violent clashes during the 2018–2020 Nicaraguan protests. Protesters fortified the UNAN campus, but were forced to retreat when the university was assaulted by police forces.

== Organization ==
The university is divided into five faculties:

- School of Medical Science
- Faculty of Education and Humanities
- Faculty of Economic Science
- POLISAL (Health Polytechnic)
- Faculty of science and engineering

== Notable people ==
- Anasha Campbell, politician and tourism executive
- Brooklyn Rivera, Miskito activist and politician

== See also ==
- Education in Nicaragua
- List of universities in Nicaragua
- List of colonial universities in Latin America
