= Education in Nicaragua =

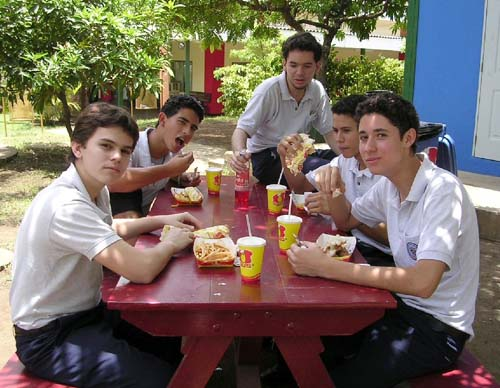
Boys at the American Nicaraguan School in Managua

Life in Nicaragua

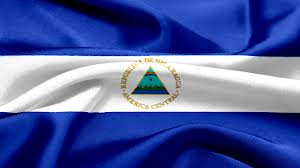

Cuisine
Culture
Demographics
Education
Holidays
Human Rights
Literature
Music
Politics
Religion
Tourism

Education in Nicaragua is free for all Nicaraguans. Elementary education is free and compulsory although this is not strictly enforced. Many children are not able to attend if their families need to have them work. Communities on the Caribbean Coast have access to education in both Spanish and the languages of the native indigenous tribes that live in the more rural areas of Nicaragua. Higher education has financial, organic and administrative autonomy, according to the law. Freedom of subjects is recognized. The school year runs from February through November.

The Human Rights Measurement Initiative (HRMI) finds that Nicaragua is fulfilling only 73.7% of what it should be fulfilling for the right to education based on the country's level of income. HRMI breaks down the right to education by looking at the rights to both primary education and secondary education. While taking into consideration Nicaragua's income level, the nation is achieving 92.3% of what should be possible based on its resources (income) for primary education but only 55.1% for secondary education. Nicaragua also has the lowest literacy rate in Central America with only 82.6% of the population age 15 and over literate.

== The higher education system ==
The oldest institution of higher education in Nicaragua is the Universidad Nacional Autonoma de Nicaragua, which was founded in 1812, dating back to the Spanish colonial period.

Between 2002 and 2003, a total of 100,363 Nicaraguan students attended universities and other institutions of higher learning. The National Council of Universities is the body responsible for strategic planning in Nicaragua.

Admission to higher education is on the basis of the Bachillerato, the leading secondary school qualification. Students are also subject to an entrance examination. The Licenciado, the main undergraduate degree, is a four- or five-year course of study. A professional title may be awarded depending on the subject. Following the Licenciado, the first postgraduate degree is the Maestria, which lasts two years and culminates with the submission of a thesis.

Institutions of higher learning can offer two- or three-year courses in technical and vocational education. The main qualification studied for is the Tecnico Superior.

There are over 30 public universities and over 75 private institutions.

== Education during the Sandinista era ==
When the Sandinistas came to power in 1979, they inherited an education system that was one of the poorest in Latin America. Under the Somozas, limited spending on education and generalized poverty forced many adolescents into the labor market and constricted educational opportunities for Nicaraguans. Anastasio Somoza García himself had said, "I don't want educated people, I want oxen" while visiting newly-built schools in neighboring Costa Rica. In the late 1970s, only 65% of primary school-age children were enrolled in school; of those who entered first grade only 22% completed the full six years of the primary school curriculum. Most rural schools offered only one or two years of schooling, and three-quarters of the rural population was illiterate.

Few students enrolled in secondary school, in part because most secondary institutions were private and too expensive for the average family. By these standards, the 8% of the college-age population enrolled in Nicaraguan universities seemed relatively high. Less surprising was that upper-class families typically sent their children abroad for higher education.

By 1984 the Sandinista government had approximately doubled the proportion of GNP spent on pre-university education, the number of primary and secondary school teachers, the number of schools, and the number of students enrolled at all levels of the education system.

At the college level, enrollment jumped from 11,142 students in 1978 to 38,570 in 1985. The Sandinistas reshaped the system of higher education: reordering curricular priorities, closing down redundant institutions and programs and establishing new ones, and increasing lower-class access to higher education. Influenced by Cuban models, the new curricula were oriented toward development needs. Agriculture, medicine, education, and technology grew at the expense of law, the humanities, and the social sciences.

== Literacy campaign ==
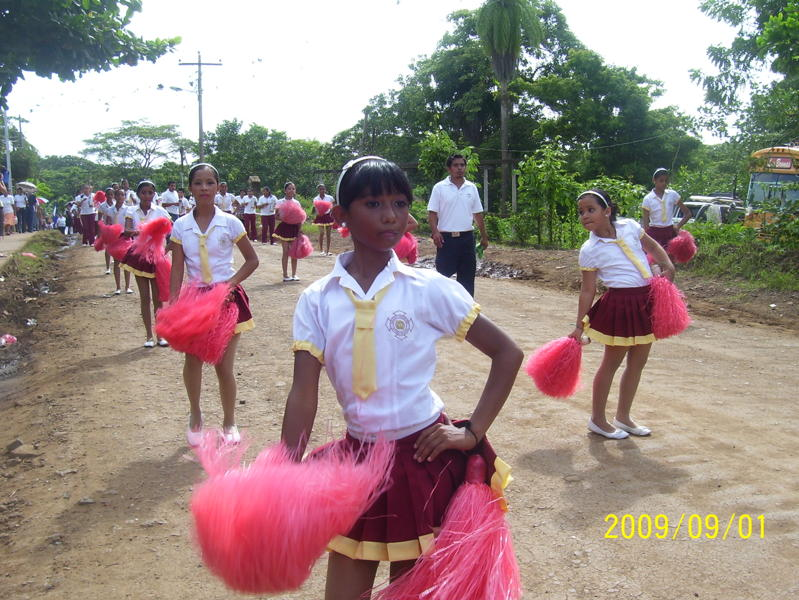
Patriotic Parade with students of the Cristo Rey School.

A 1980 literacy campaign, using secondary school students as volunteer teachers, including women and children, reduced the illiteracy rate from 50% to 23% of the population. (The latter figure exceeds the rate of 13% claimed by the literacy campaign, which did not count adults whom the government classified as learning impaired or otherwise unteachable.)

In part to consolidate the gains of the literacy campaign, the Ministry of Education set up a system of informal self-education groups known as Popular Education Cooperatives. Using materials and pedagogical advice provided by the ministry, residents of poor communities met in the evenings to develop basic reading and mathematical skills. The key large-scale programs of the Sandinistas included a massive National Literacy Crusade (March–August 1980), social program, which received international recognition for their gains in literacy, health care, education, childcare, unions, and land reform.

One of the hallmarks of Sandinista education (and favored target of anti-Sandinista criticism) was the ideological orientation of the curriculum. The stated goal of instruction was the development of a "new man" whose virtues were to include patriotism, "internationalism", an orientation toward productive work, and a willingness to sacrifice individual interests to social and national interests. Textbooks were nationalist and prorevolutionary in tone, giving ample coverage to Sandinista heroes.

After the 1990 election, the Chamorro government placed education in the hands of critics of Sandinista policy, who imposed more conservative values on the curriculum. A new set of textbooks was produced with support from the United States Agency for International Development (AID), which had provided similar help during the Somoza era.

Despite the Sandinistas' determined efforts to expand the education system in the early 1980s, Nicaragua remained an undereducated society in 1993. Even before the Contra War and the economic crisis that forced spending on education back to the 1970 level, the education system was straining to keep up with the rapidly growing school-age population. Between 1980 and 1990, the number of children between five and fourteen years of age had expanded by 35%. At the end of the Sandinista era, the literacy rate had declined from the level attained at the conclusion of the 1980 literacy campaign. Overall school enrollments were larger than they had been in the 1970s, however. Especially in the countryside, access to education had broadened dramatically. But a substantial minority of primary school-age children and three-quarters of secondary school-age students were not in school, and the proportion of students who completed their primary education had not advanced beyond the 1979 level. Even by Central American standards, the Nicaraguan education system was performing poorly.

== Grading system ==
Academic grading in Nicaragua works on a 100-point scale. For primary school and high school levels, a 60 is good enough to pass, while for further levels the pass grade is 70. Students who attain from 60 to the pass grade get the chance to take one extra test that reviews the year's topics and in which a 70 is needed to achieve a pass grade.

== See also ==
- List of schools in Nicaragua
- List of universities in Nicaragua
