= Dead Body (disambiguation) =

A dead body or corpse is a dead human body.

Dead Body may also refer to:

- Dead Body (film), a 2002 short film by Kaz Rahman
- "The Dead Body", an episode of R. L. Stine's The Haunting Hour
- The Dead Body, two episodes of Swift and Shift Couriers

== See also ==
- Dead Body on Broadway, a 1969 German thriller film by Harald Reinl
- Dead Body Guy, a pseudonym of Chuck Lamb, a programmer from Columbus, Ohio, who gained fame playing dead people in film and television
- My Dead Body, a 2009 pulp-noir/horror novel by American writer Charlie Huston
- Cadaver (disambiguation)
- Carcass (disambiguation)
- Carrion (disambiguation)
- Corpse (disambiguation)
- Over my dead body (disambiguation)
