= Carcasses =

Carcasses may refer to:

- Canari noir, red French wine grape variety
- Carcasses (film), a 2009 film by Denis Côté
- Plural of carcass (disambiguation)

Carcasses is also a family name originating from the town of Carcassonne, Aude, France. People with this name include:

- Moana Carcasses (born 1963), Vanuatu politician
- Roberto Carcassés (born 1972), Cuban jazz pianist
