= List of shopping malls in Nicaragua =

The 1972 Managua earthquake virtually destroyed all of the existing supermarkets, shops and department stores in the city of Managua. New shopping centers and malls were rebuilt on other locations, which formed the bases for Managua's dispersed structure.

== History ==
=== The seventies: rebuilding Managua ===
The Somoza regime declared 1973 as the year of "Hope and Reconstruction". Many of the shops destroyed by the earthquake were relocated to the premises of the old Livestock Fair, next to the Colonia Centroamerica neighborhood, forming the Centro Comercial Managua, built in provisional facilities.

A modern and more permanent shopping center was built in 1974, the Centro Comercial Camino de Oriente, with movie theaters, restaurants, a bowling alley and two night clubs, the Lobo Jack and Infinito Discotheque. Under the same premise, a smaller shopping center at the Colonia Centroamerica was built, the Plaza de Compras de la Centroamerica, today almost abandoned housing only a supermarket, a fast food chain and some smaller office spaces.

Several commercial projects were carried out in the seventies, all of them in the new neighborhoods of the periphery of Managua, such as the Centro Comercial Plaza España, built in 1975 in the upscale Bolonia neighborhood. Other shopping centers of that time are the Centro Comercial Nejapa, which housed the Managua Local District Court until the end of 2012, and similar developments in the neighborhoods of Bello Horizonte, Ciudad Jardin and Linda Vista.

=== Present and future ===
Many of the shopping centers built in the seventies are now partially abandoned or used for other purposes. One notable exception is Metrocentro Managua, built in 1974 by Salvadorean investors, and renovated and extended with more store space and the building of the four-star Hotel Real InterContinental Metrocentro Managua in 1998 and 2004.

In 1998, thanks to the economic improvement after the civil war of the last decade, the new Plaza Inter shopping mall was built in Managua's historical center by foreign investors.

With the new millennium, larger and more spacious shopping malls were built, such as Galerías Santo Domingo in 2005 and Multicentro Las Américas in 2006. In 2011 the first shopping mall outside the capital city Managua was built: the Centro Plaza Occidente in Chinandega. Another, Multicentro Estelí, opened in 2013 in the northern city of Estelí.

== List of shopping malls ==
Image	Name	Location	Opening date	Owner	No. of stores	GLA	Location	Ref.
	Centro Plaza Occidente	Chinandega	2011	Santasara, S.A	60	14,361 m2	12.621884°N 87.119356°W	
	Multicentro Estelí	Estelí	2013	Desarrollos de Nicaragua	46	7,000 m2	13.100039°N 86.351947°W	
	Camino de Oriente	Managua	1974	—N/a	74	—N/a	12.110655°N 86.254312°W	
	Centro Comercial Managua	Managua	1973	Inversiones Comerciales, S.A.	210	20,500 m2	12.116636°N 86.247998°W	
	Galerías Santo Domingo	Managua	2005	Inmobiliaria Santo Domingo	108	57,000 m2	12.10366°N 86.249103°W	
	Metrocentro Managua	Managua	1974	Grupo Roble	120	50,000 m2	12.128537°N 86.264896°W	
	Multicentro Las Américas	Managua	2006	Desarrollos Sooner	147	53,000 m2	12.139273°N 86.229024°W	
	Plaza Inter	Managua	1998	Nica Eastern Development	65	16,000 m2	12.144499°N 86.274332°W	

== Strip malls ==
As Managua spread out following the earthquake, a large number of strip malls, or shopping plazas, were built all around the city. These strip malls are home to a small number of stores, usually between five and fifteen, and are located in Managua's main commercial arteries and neighbourhoods. A non-exhaustive list of strip malls includes:

- Centro Comercial Alpha
- Centro Comercial Ciudad Jardín
- Centro Comercial El Tiangue
- Centro Comercial Linda Vista
- Centro Comercial Plaza España
- Plaza Bolonia
- Plaza Cadin
- Plaza Caracol
- Plaza Conchito
- Plaza Consuelo
- Plaza El Güegüense
- Plaza Flamingo
- Plaza Mayor
- Plaza Nogal
- Plaza Porta's
- Plaza San Agustín
- Plaza Santrinni
- Plaza Toscana
- Plaza Trébol
- Shopping Center Las Colinas

== Gallery ==
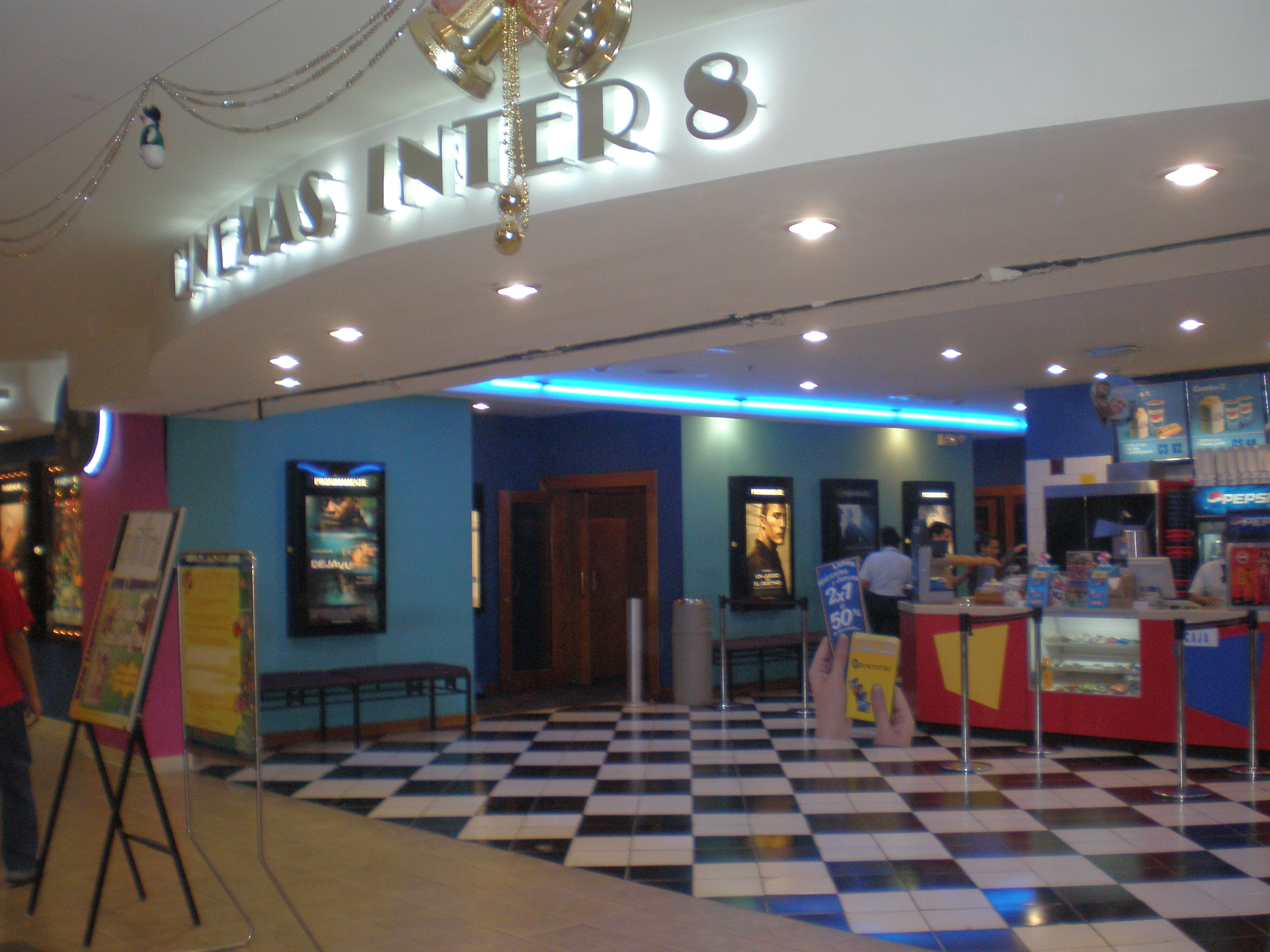
Cinemas at the fourth floor of Plaza Inter shopping mall.

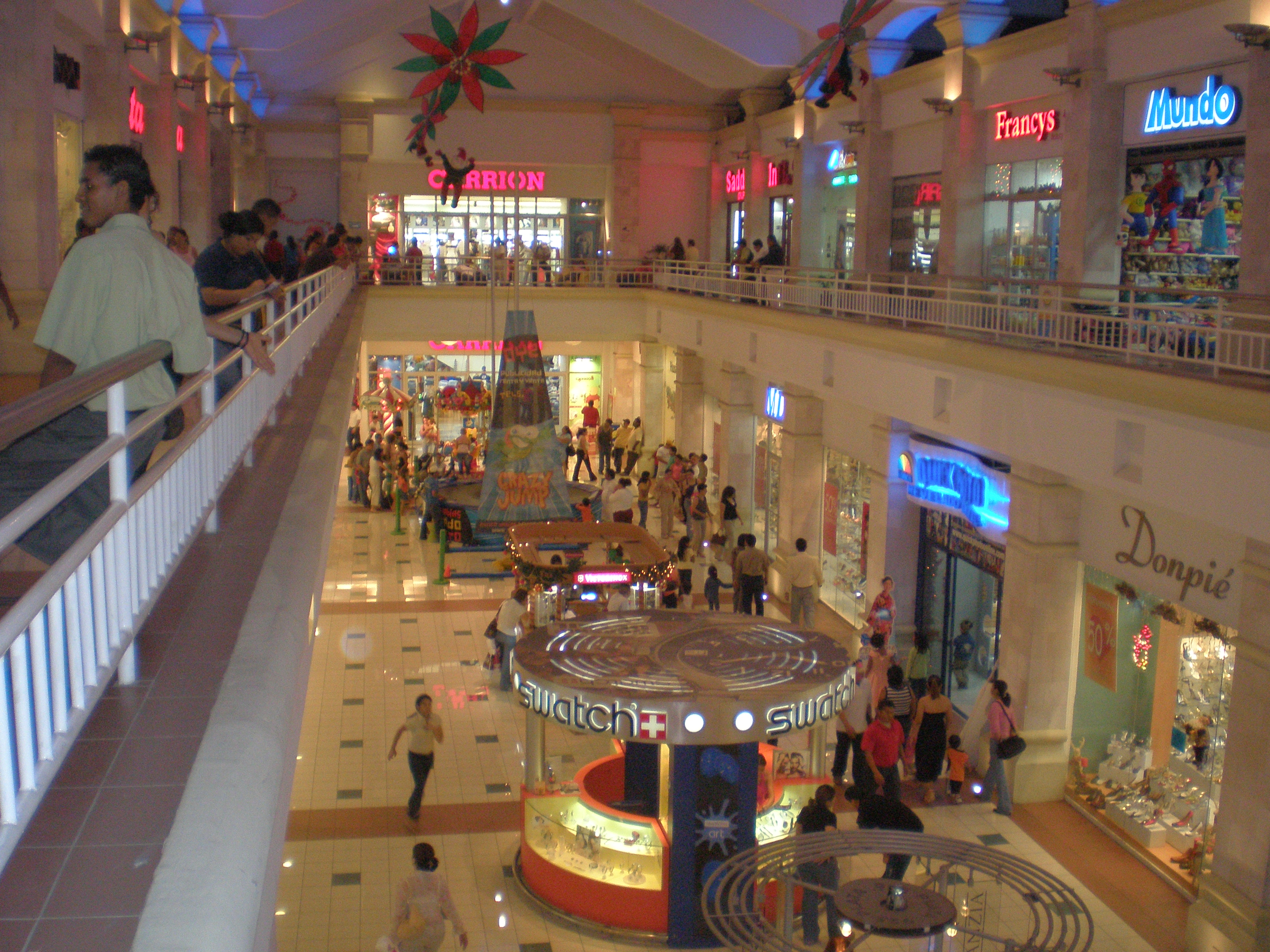
Third phase of Metrocentro, completed in 2004, with anchor store Carrión

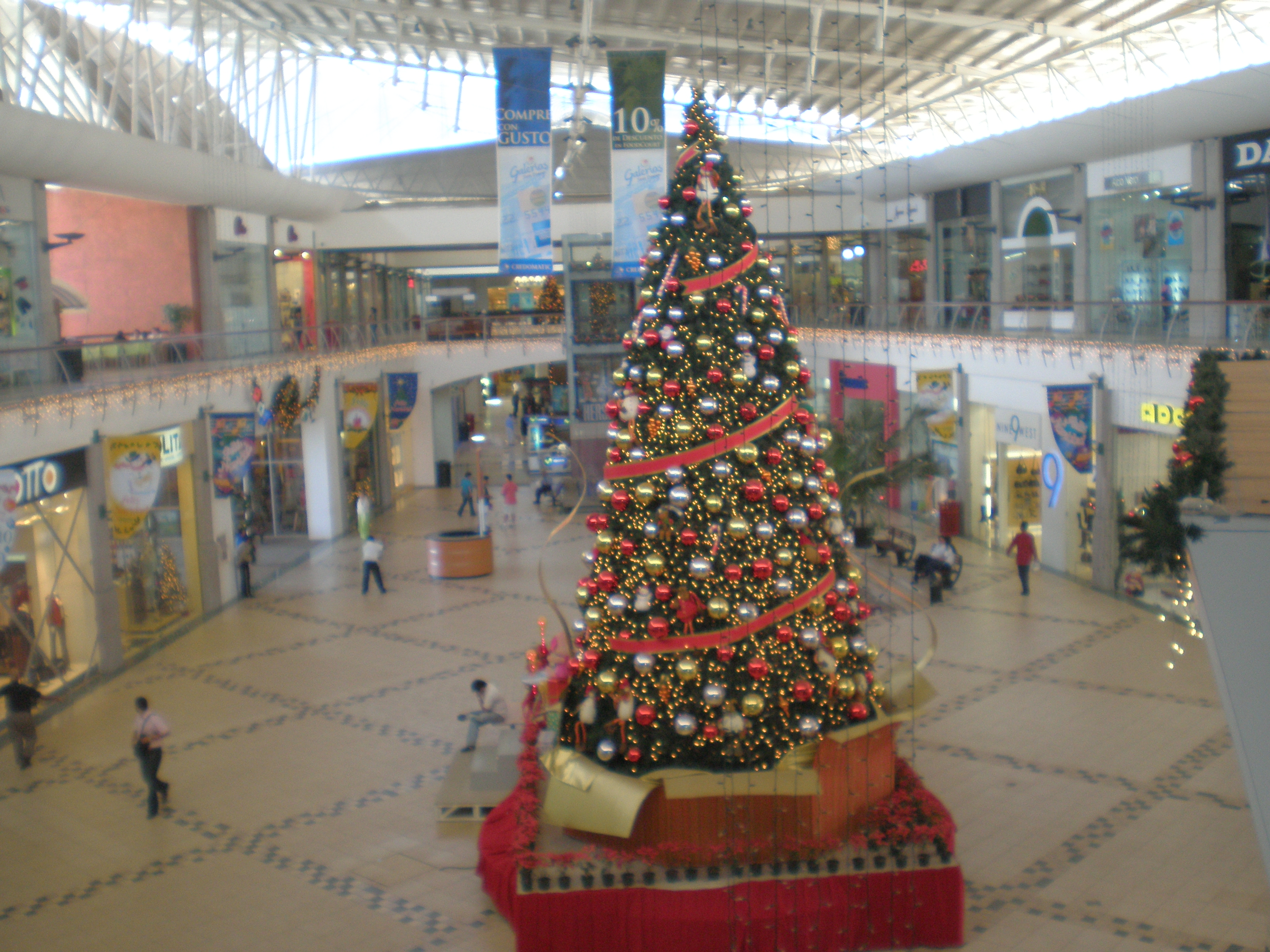
Galerías Santo Domingo shopping mall during Christmas

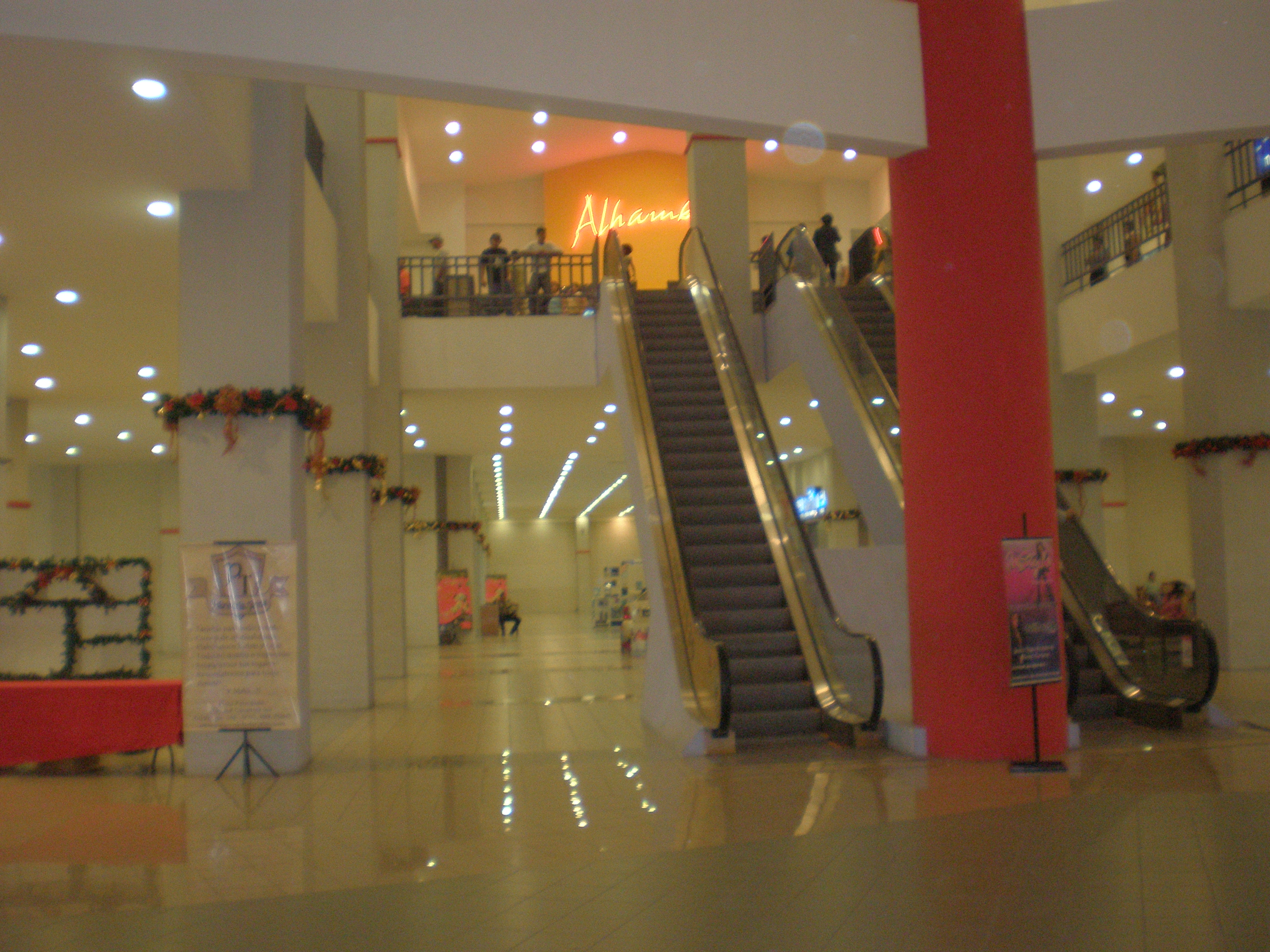
Inside Multicentro Las Américas shopping mall

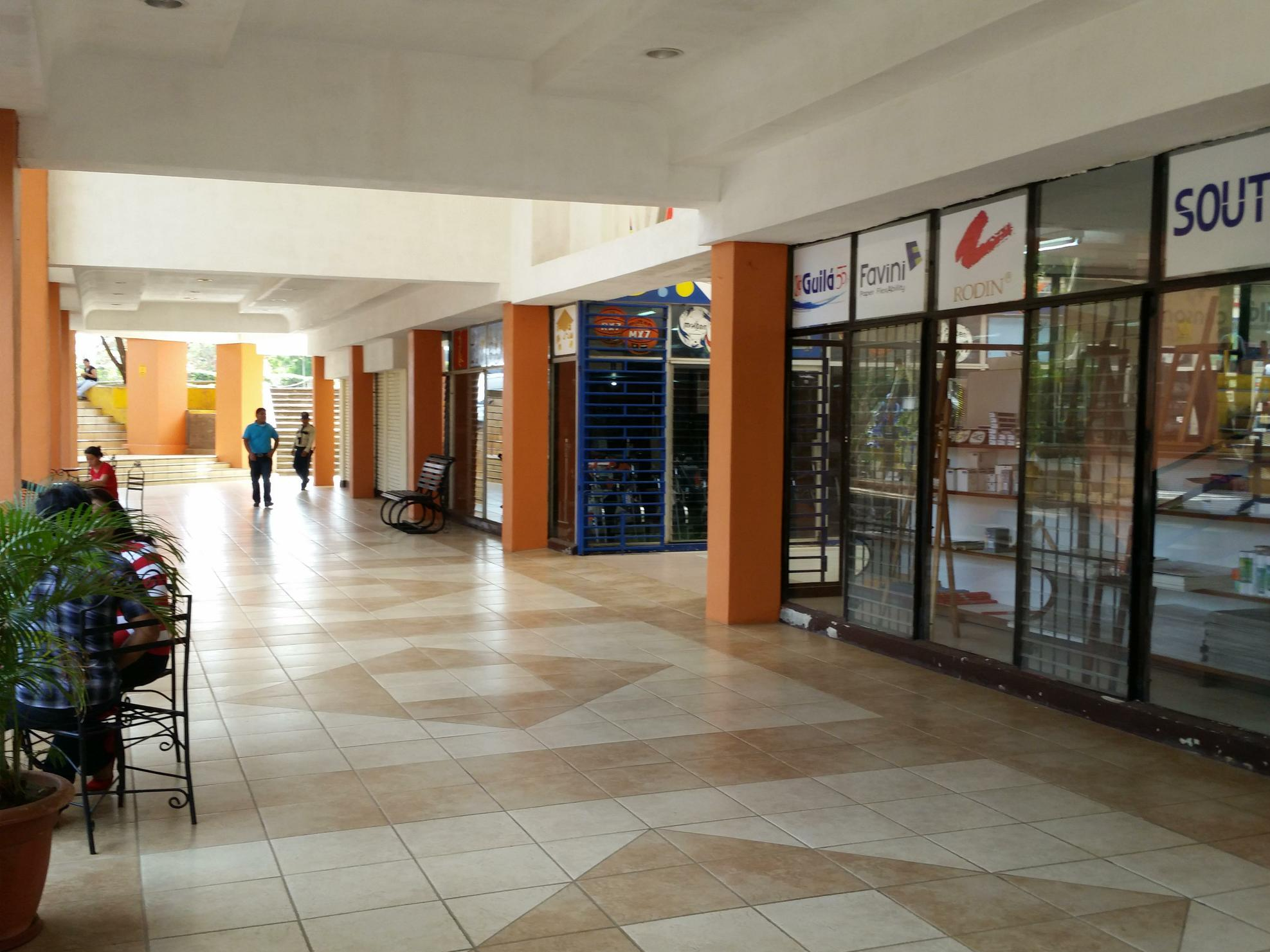
Inside Centro Comercial Managua mall
