= Kaz Rahman =

Canadian visual artist and filmmaker (born 1973)

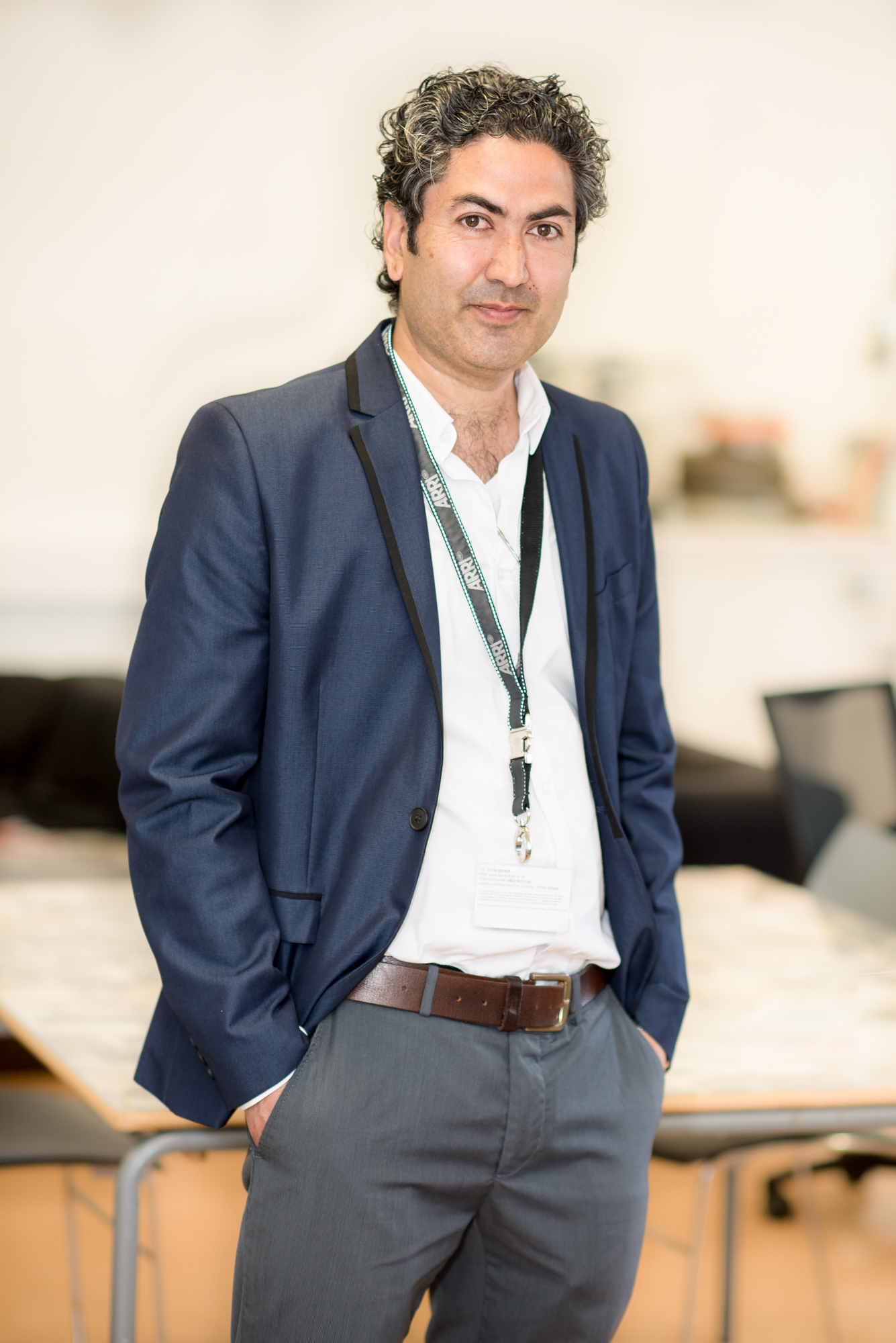
- Kaz Rahman at Plymouth College of Art 2016
- Born: 1973 (age 52–53); Ontario, Canada
- Occupations: Filmmaker, visual artist

Kaz Rahman (born 1973) is a Canadian visual artist and filmmaker. His work explores and coalesces the intersection between Islamic artistic expression, the natural elements and contemporary culture.

== Early life and education ==
Rahman was born and grew up in Ontario, Canada. He is of Hyderabadi Muslim, Cornish, and English descent. He studied Visual Arts at York University in Toronto, Ontario, (BFA), painting/photography at the University of Northumbria in Newcastle, England and later Media Arts at City College (CUNY) in New York City where he earned his MFA. He has also lived in Moscow, Russia (1998), Budapest, Hungary (1999), Hyderabad, India (2004–08), Pittsburgh, United States (2008–14), Istanbul, Turkey (2014–16) has lived and worked in Plymouth, United Kingdom where he was lecturer in film at Plymouth College of Art, and currently lives and works in Knoxville, United States, as an associate professor at the University of Tennessee.

== Art ==
Rahman's key solo exhibitions include Magic Carpet at the Art Gallery of Peterborough in 2001, Flood in the Sky at the State Gallery of Fine Arts in Hyderabad, India in 2005, Deccani Ark at the Bombay Art Gallery in 2007 and "Salaat" at the Hasta Gallery in Hyderabad, India in 2008.

From February to September 2011, his work was exhibited at the San Jose Museum of Art as part of the group show Roots in the Air, Branches Below: Modern and Contemporary Art from India.

In late 2011, an exhibition of his photography and video work was shown at the 4th International Video Arte Festival in Camaguey, Cuba.

== Films ==
In 2002, Rahman directed the 40 minute film Dead Body starring Pakistani novelist H. M. Naqvi. The film won the 'Special Jury Award' at the 2002 Cityvisions Film Festival in New York City and was screened at Anthology Film Archives and at the National Film Board of Canada.

In 2010 he made his feature film debut with Salaat. The film was screened at the Melwood Screening Room at Pittsburgh Filmmakers and The Andy Warhol Museum in Pittsburgh; India Habitat Centre in New Delhi, The Salar Jung Museum in Hyderabad, Factoria Habana in Havana, Cuba and as an installation at the 4th Video Arte Festival in Camaguey, Cuba. Salaat was shot in Hyderabad, India and Ontario, Canada. The film weaves a breadth of imagery from the burning, decaying beauty of the land through lush forests to the stark desolation of winter and beyond. Five different women walk, ride and work through the day and each performs prayer or ‘Salaat’ at one of five different times.

In 2012, he completed work on his second feature film Deccani Souls. The film was screened at The Hollywood Theater in Pittsburgh, USA on June 14. It was screened to the public in India in New Delhi, Cochin, Thrissur, Kozhikode, Hyderabad and Mumbai in August and September 2012.

== Performance Art ==
In mid to late 2022, Rahman collaborated with his wife, Hedy Hurban, in creating a multimedia performance art known as Digital Dervish . Inspired by traditional Sufi whirling, the performance is a story about a Dervish who is in a dream and wakes up to birds and the sounds of nature, beginning to meditate. He becomes enveloped in a storm of chaos as he whirls wildly and then collapses, becoming dormant and rising again. The performance had 4 events in 3 locations, one in Plymouth, United Kingdom, two in Peterborough, Ontario, and one in Dubai, UAE.

== Filmography ==
| Year | Title | Other notes |
|---|---|---|
| 2002 | Dead Body | Short film |
| 2010 | Salaat | |
| 2012 | Deccani Souls | |
