= Carry On =

Carry On may refer to:

== Film ==
- Carry On (film), a 1927 British silent film
- Carry On (franchise), a British comedy media franchise
- Carry-On, a 2024 American action thriller film

== Music ==
=== Albums ===
- Carry On (Chris Cornell album)
- Carry On (Crosby, Stills, Nash & Young album), a sampler of the box set CSN, 1991
- Carry On (Kansas album), 1992
- Carry On (Pat Green album)
- Carry On (Stephen Stills album), a box set, 2013
- Carry On (EP), a 2011 EP by People on Vacation
- Carry On, a 2020 album by The Score, or the title track with Awolnation
- Carry On, see Bobby Caldwell

=== Songs ===
- "Carry On" (Avenged Sevenfold song), 2012
- "Carry On" (Crosby, Stills, Nash & Young song), 1970
- "Carry On" (Donna Summer song), 1992
- "Carry On" (Fun song), 2012
- "Carry On" (Kenny Chesney song), 2026
- "Carry On" (Kygo and Rita Ora song), 2019
- "Carry On" (Lisa Stansfield song), 2014
- "Carry On" (Martha Wash song), 1992
- "Carry On" (Motor Ace song), 2002
- "Carry On" (Norah Jones song), 2016
- "Carry On" (Pat Green song), 2001
- "Carry On" (XXXTentacion song), 2017
- "Carry On", by 5 Seconds of Summer from Sounds Good Feels Good
- "Carry On", by Angra from Angels Cry
- "Carry On", by Bayside from The Walking Wounded
- "Carry On", by Blessthefall from Hollow Bodies
- "Carry On", by The Box
- "Carry On", by Coeur de Pirate from Roses
- "Carry On", by Coldrain from The Revelation
- "Carry On", by The Cranberries from Wake Up and Smell the Coffee
- "Carry On", by England Dan & John Ford Coley from I Hear Music
- "Carry On", by Freedom Call from The Circle of Life
- "Carry On", by Galneryus from Resurrection
- "Carry On", by Jennifer Cihi from the final season one episode of Sailor Moon
- "Carry On", by JJ Cale from Shades
- "Carry On", by Manowar from Fighting the World
- "Carry On", by Martha Wash, also covered by Diana Ross from Every Day Is a New Day
- "Carry On", by Memphis May Fire from This Light I Hold
- "Carry On", by Mushroomhead from A Wonderful Life
- "Carry On", by Myrath from Karma
- "Carry On", by Night Ranger from Big Life
- "Carry On", by Olivia Holt from the film Bears
- "Carry On", by Periphery from A Pale White Dot
- "Carry On", by Soul Asylum from While You Were Out
- "Carry On", by Spacehog from The Chinese Album
- "Carry On", by Uriah Heep from Conquest
- "Carry On (Her Letter to Him)", a song by Ne-Yo from R.E.D.
- "Carry On", by Stupeflip from Stupeflip

== Other ==
- Carry On (novel), a 2015 fantasy novel by Rainbow Rowell
- "Carry On" (Supernatural), the series finale of the television series Supernatural
- Carry-on luggage or hand luggage, luggage that is carried into the passenger compartment

== See also ==
- Keep Calm and Carry On, a 1939 British wartime poster that has become a cultural meme
- Carreon (disambiguation)
- Carrion (disambiguation)
