= Carrion (surname) =

Carrion or Carrión is a surname. Notable people with the surname include:

- Adolfo Carrión Jr. (born 1961), American businessman and Bronx politician
- Alejandra Carrión (born 1996), Puerto Rican football (soccer) player
- Alejandro Carrión (1915–1992), Ecuadorian poet, novelist and journalist
- Alfredo Alejandro Carrión (born 1948), Puerto Rican politician
- April Carrión (born 1989), Puerto Rican drag performer and television personality
- Audrey Carrion (born 1958), American judge
- Benjamín Carrión (1897–1979), Ecuadorian writer, diplomat, and cultural promoter
- Camille Carrión (born 1946), Puerto Rican actress and businesswoman, granddaughter of Rafael Carrrión Sr.
- Cynthia Carrion (born 1948), Filipino sports executive and government official
- Clodoveo Carrión Mora (1883–1957), Ecuadorian palaeontologist and naturalist
- Daniel Alcides Carrión (1857–1885), Peruvian doctor who described Oroya fever
- Danieska Carrión (born 1980), Cuban judoka
- Eladio Carrión (born 1994), American rapper and songwriter
- Enrique Carrión (born 1967), Cuban boxer
- Javier Carrión (born 1990), Spanish rugby player and coach
- Jerónimo Carrión (1804–1873), Ecuadorian president
- Jerónimo de Carrión (1660–1721), Spanish baroque composer
- Jorge Carrión (born 1976), Spanish writer and cultural critic
- Jorge Carrión Pavlich (1950–2026), Peruvian Roman Catholic bishop
- Jose Antonio Carrion (1948–2017), Filipino businessman and politician
- Josue Carrión (born c. 1978), Puerto Rican businessman and TV show host
- Juan Carlos Carrión (born 1982), Ecuadorian football (soccer) manager
- Leonel Carrión (born 1952), Venezuelan baseball coach
- Lizette Carrión (born 1972), American actress
- Luis Carrión (born 1979), Spanish football (soccer) player and manager
- Luis Carrión Beltrán (1942–1997), Mexican screenwriter, journalist, novelist and professor
- Luis Carrión Cruz (born 1952), Nicaraguan politician
- Marcelo Carrión (born 1956), Dominican chess player
- María José Carrión (born 1977), Ecuadorian politician
- Noemí Carrión, Spanish singer and actress
- Pedro Carrión (born 1971), Cuban boxer
- Rafael Carrión Sr. (1891–1964), Puerto Rican businessman
- Raul Carrion (born 1945), Brazilian politician and historian
- Richard Carrión (born 1952), Puerto Rican businessman, grandson of Rafael Carrrión Sr.
- Ulises Carrión (1941–1989), Mexican conceptual artist

== See also ==
- Carrion (disambiguation)
