= Carcas =

Carcas is a possible misspelling of:

- Caracas, a city in Venezuela
- Carcass, a dead body
