= List of cinemas in Nicaragua =

Cinemas in Nicaragua are popular venues for entertainment. As of 2018, there were 54 screens in Nicaragua, with 39 in the capital city Managua.

== History ==
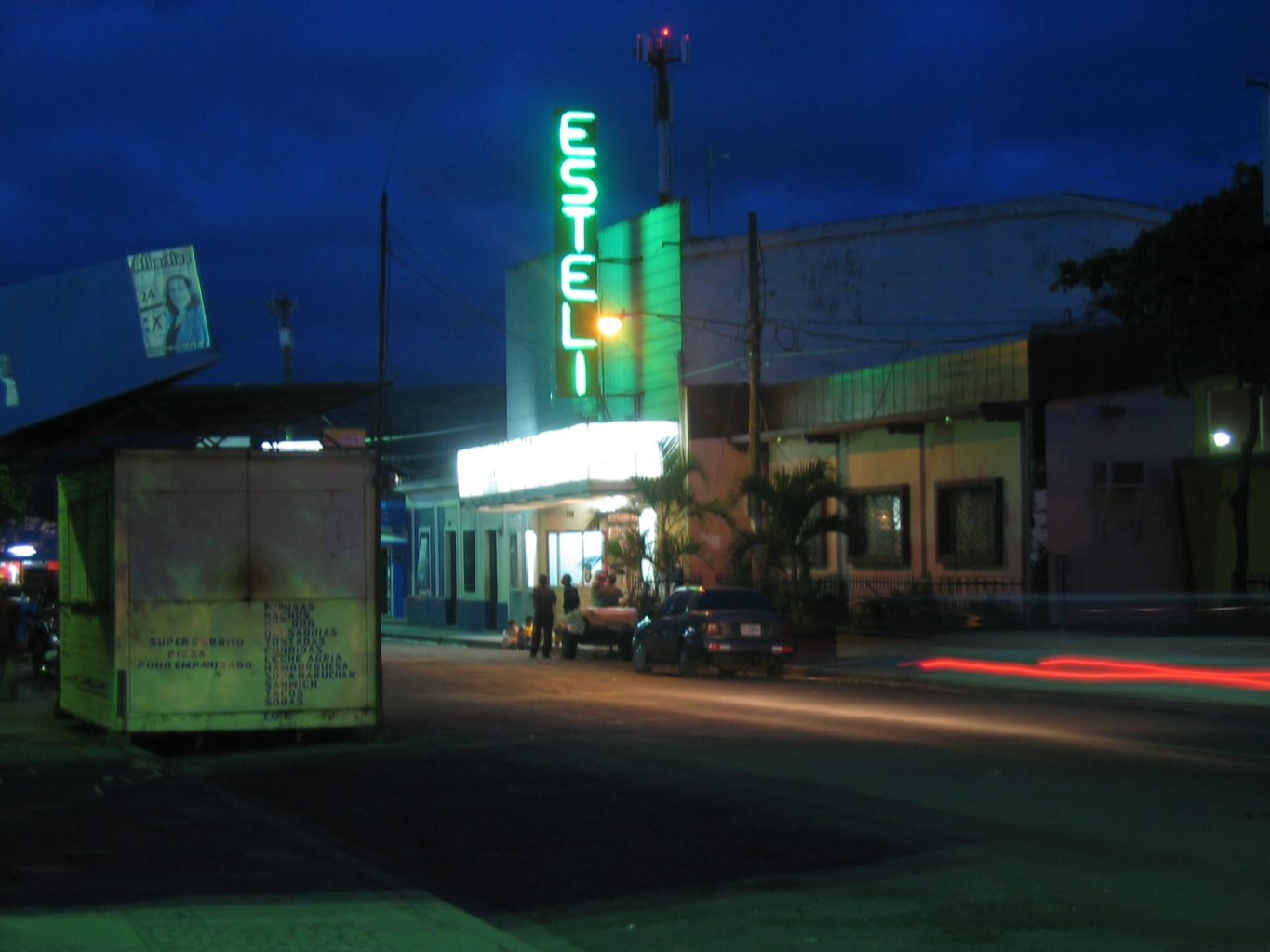
Actual Cine Estelí in the city of Estelí, Nicaragua, 2006.

Cinema in Nicaragua goes as way back as the end of the 19th century, when the first movie projection took place in January 1900 at the prestigious Teatro Castaño in Managua. The first movie theater, Salón de Cine San Jacinto, opened in 1909.

The first sound film projected in Nicaragua, in June 1930, at the Teatro Excélsior in León was The Shopworn Angel, starring Gary Cooper. According to the local newspapers, this significant event was a resounding success for the crowd who witnessed the novelty of motion picture with synchronized sound. A couple of days later the same film was projected at the Teatro Margot in Managua.

With the advent of sound film, the number of movie theaters grew, many of them in the cities of Chinandega, Masaya, Granada, Rivas and other cities of the Pacific coast of Nicaragua. The number of weekly projections also increased because of the demand.

The fifties and the sixties are considered the golden age of the movie theaters in Nicaragua. More than 150 movie theaters operated in the country, most of them spread through the most populous neighborhoods of the city of Managua. These cinemas were organized in movie circuits or chains, owned by local entrepreneurs, one of the most popular being Cines RAP, who was later nationalized in the eighties.

With the 1972 Managua earthquake most of the movie theaters were destroyed or burnt down. Movie theaters like Teatro Ruiz, Alcázar, Cine Blanco, Fénix, San Luis, Cine Tropical, Cine Managua and Cine Bóer disappeared completely. Others, like Teatro González, Cabrera, Dorado and Bello Horizonte, were partially renovated in the following decades and repurposed as evangelical temples, casinos, car parts stores and other small businesses.

In the early days, the films playing in Nicaraguan cinemas were mostly Mexican feature films, losing ground over the years to the mainstream Hollywood films that today dominates the local box office. Nowadays, the only two cinemas that screens particularly classic and art-house films are Cinemateca Nacional and Teatro Justo Rufino Garay.

The majority of the Nicaraguan movie theaters, at least in capital city Managua, operates in major malls and shopping centers and are owned by the three local movie theater chains Alhambra, Cinemas and Siglo Nuevo, and the international Cinemark. As of 2014, one of the oldest movie theaters still in operation is Cine Karawala in the city of Granada.

The Teatro Esteli, has begun an extensive restoration process in May 2015, by Alfonso Noel Lovo, grandson of a founding member, Alfonso Lovo Moncada. It will be opened as an art cinema, and event center, as well as a convention center. It will feature, in addition to art cinema, concerts, plays, beauty contests, university conferences, art exhibitions, as cultural center of Esteli, which is the capital of Nicaragua's north, both economically and culturally. It has 430 seats, and will have a gourmet coffee and snack bar in addition to a cigar lounge upstairs overlooking the Parque de la Madre, which is being renovated by City Hall. The Teatro Esteli is an Art Deco style, 70-year-old building and it is considered a relic by the Esteli people.

== List of cinemas ==
Cinema	Screens	Seats	Location	Opening date	Remarks
Cine Karawala	2	—N/a	Granada	1960?	
Cinemark Metrocentro Managua	6	—N/a	Managua	1998	
Cinemas Bello Horizonte	6	900	Managua	2006	
Cinemas Galerías Santo Domingo	10	1730	Managua	2005	
Cinemas Masaya	4	768	Masaya	2017	
Cinemas Plaza Inter	8	—N/a	Managua	1998	
Cinemas VIP	3	—N/a	Managua	1997	
Cinemateca Nacional de Nicaragua	1	—N/a	Managua	1979	
Justo Rufino Garay	1	150	Managua	1995	
Siglo Nuevo Chinandega	3	450	Chinandega	2013	
Teatro Estelí	1	494	Estelí	1956	
Siglo Nuevo Estelí	2	248	Estelí	2014	
Siglo Nuevo Las Brisas	4	—N/a	Managua	2016	
Siglo Nuevo León	3	224	León	2000	

== Gallery ==
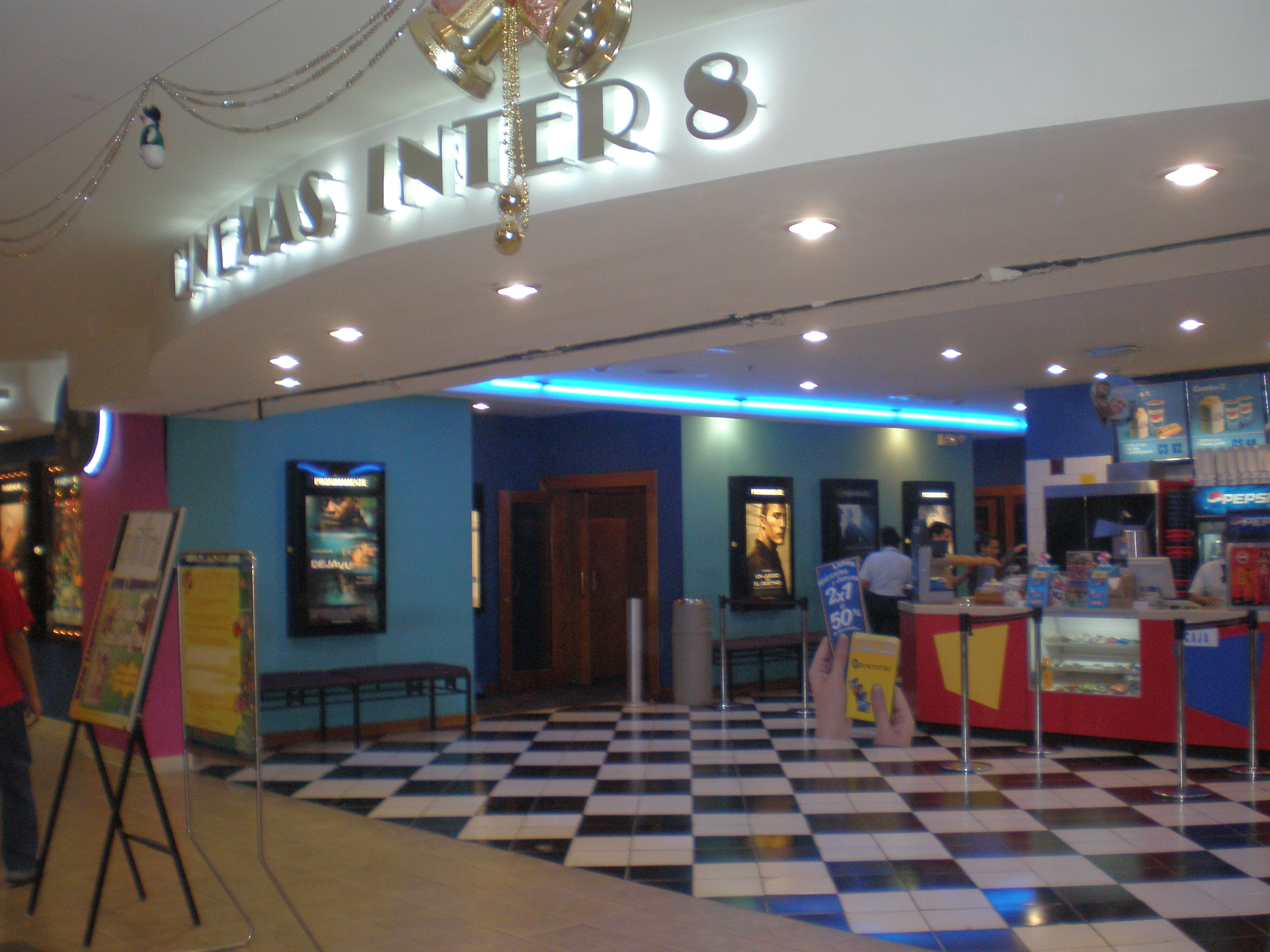
Cinemas Inter movie teather.

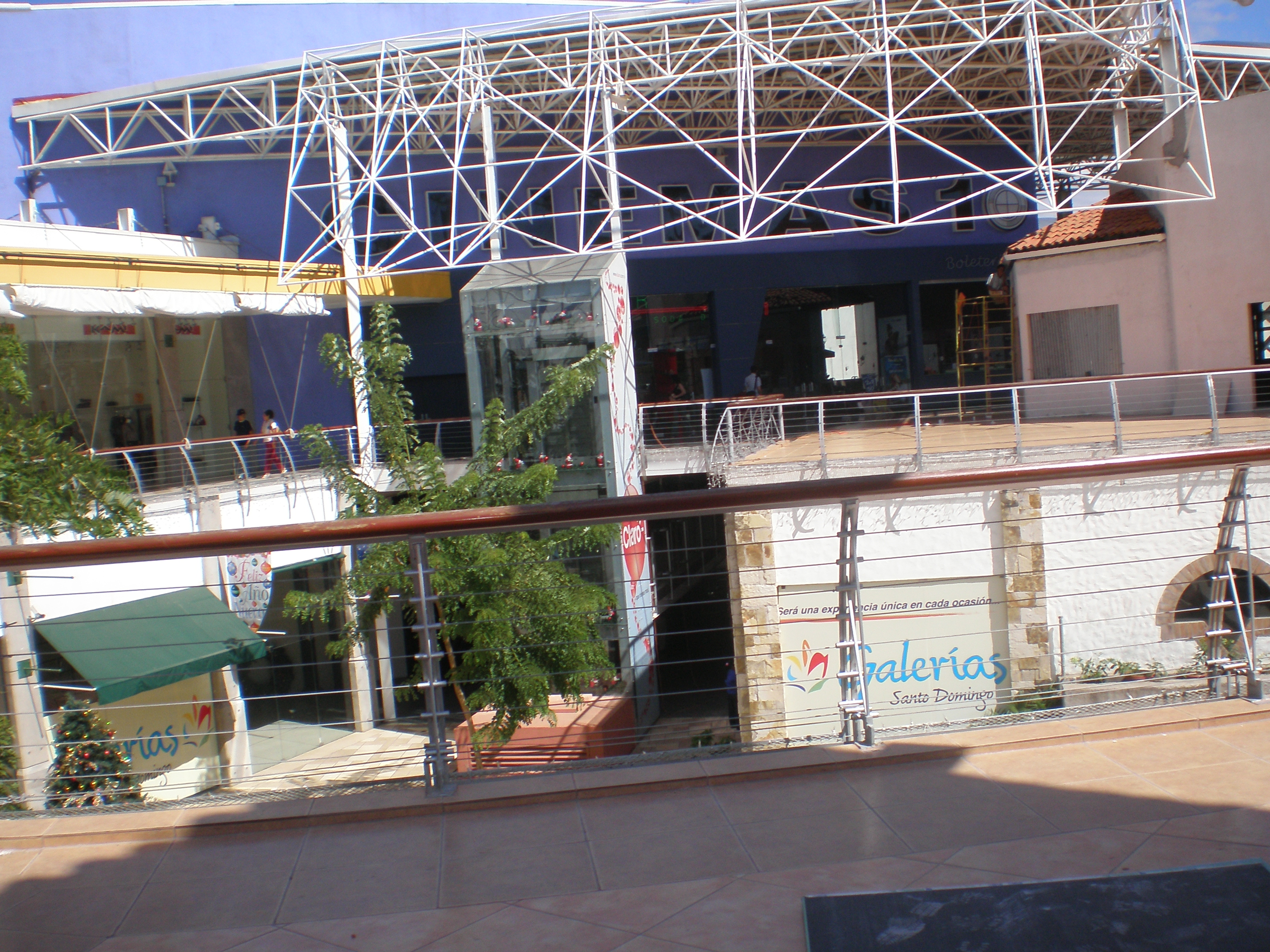
Cinemas Galerias Santo Domingo.

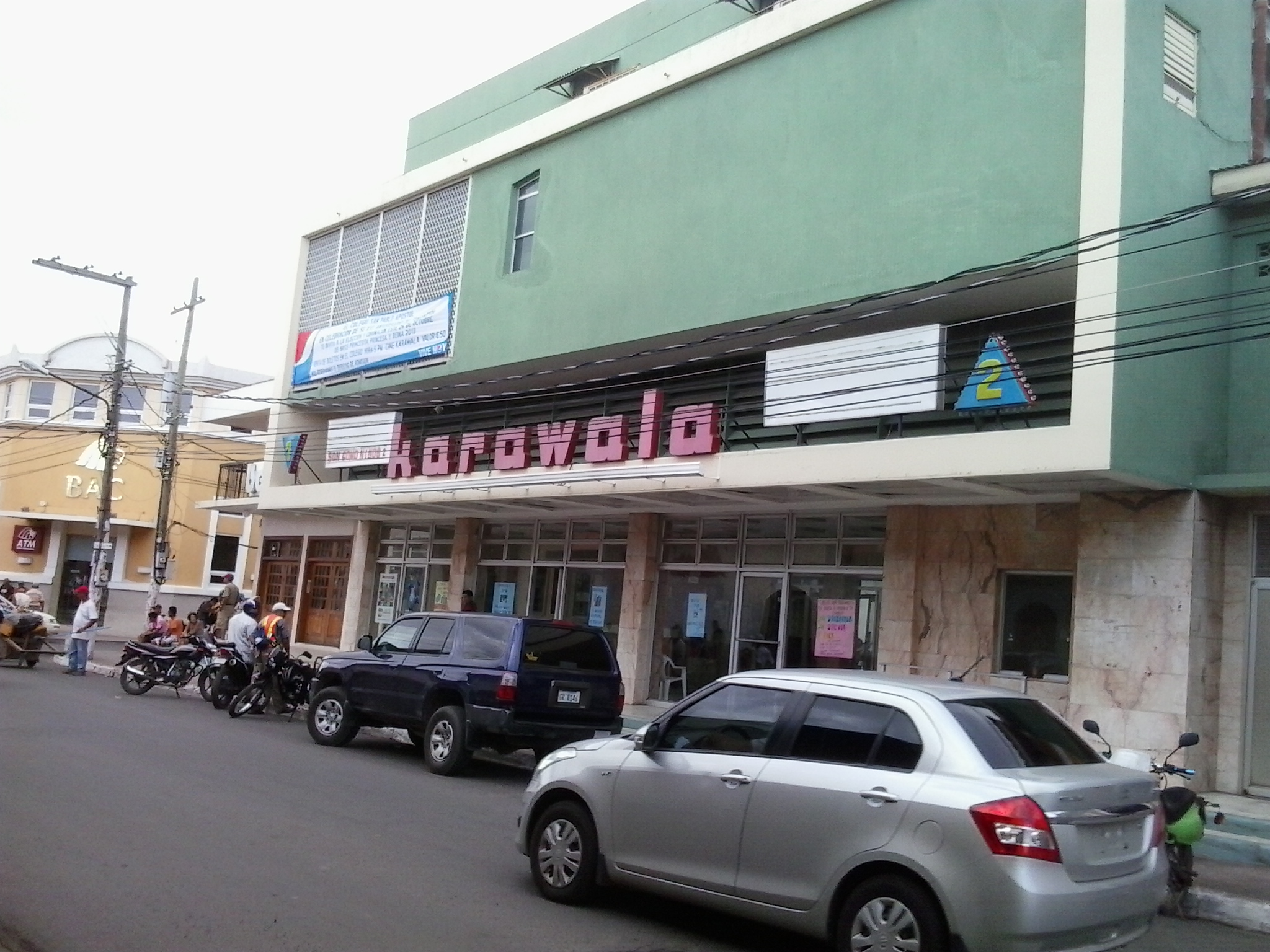
Cine Karawala in Granada, Nicaragua.

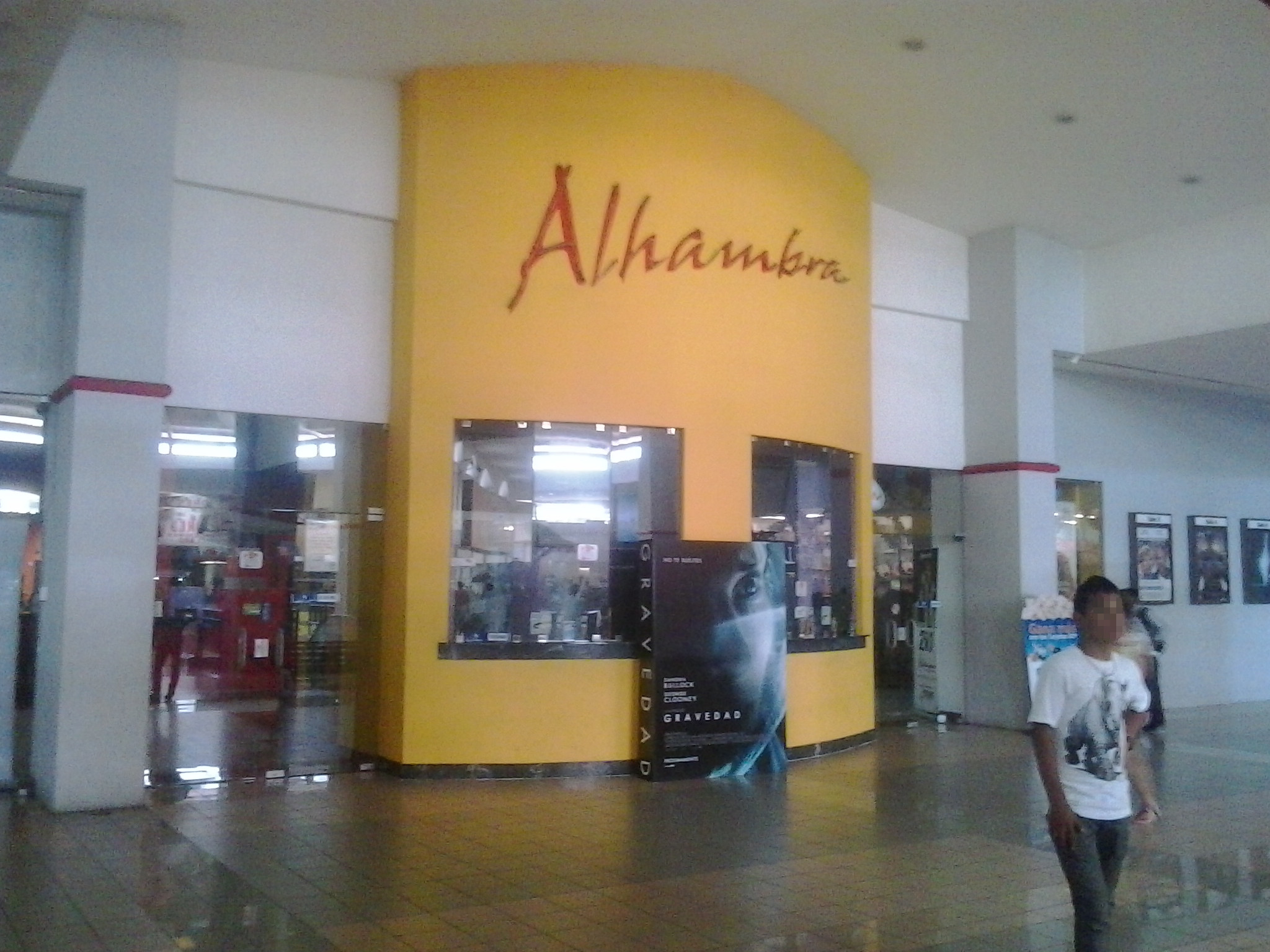
Alhambra Bello Horizonte movie theater.

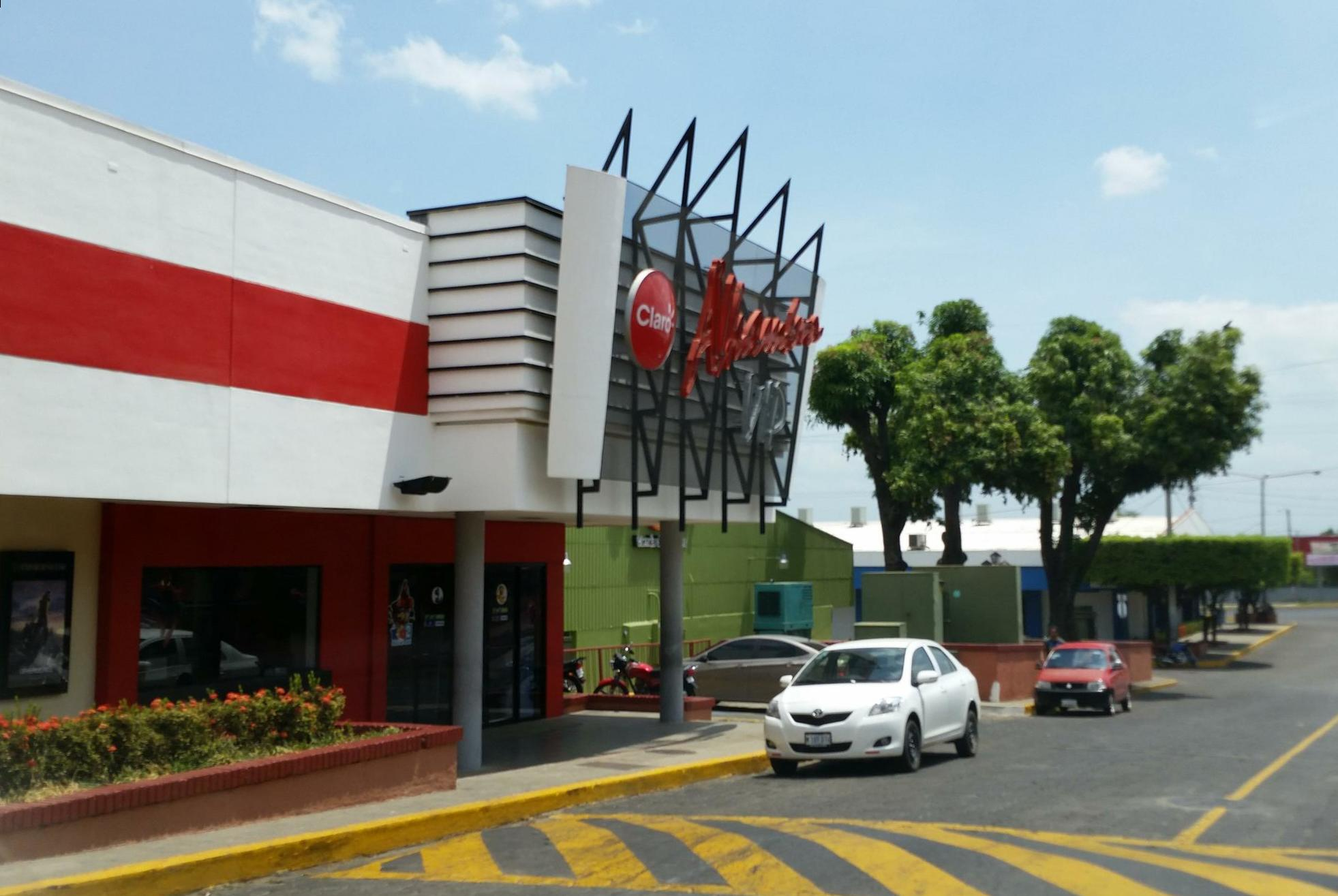
Alhambra VIP cinema in Managua, Nicaragua.

== See also ==
- List of Nicaraguan films
