= Corpse (disambiguation) =

A corpse is a dead body, usually of a human.

Corpse may also refer to:

- Corpse (film), 1982 film
- Crucible of Horror, a 1971 British horror film, later released as The Corpse
- The Corpse (film), a Vietnamese film
- The Corpse, a black ops group within the Green Lantern Corps
- Corpse Husband, also known as Corpse, American YouTuber and rapper

== People with the surname ==
- Keli Corpse (born 1974), Canadian retired professional ice hockey player

== See also ==
- Corpse paint, a style of black and white makeup used by black metal bands
- Corpse plant, a plant with the smell of a rotting animal
- Corpsing, theatrical slang for an actor breaking character during a scene, usually by laughing
- Corps, a military grouping
- Carcass (disambiguation)
- Cadaver (disambiguation)
- Carrion (disambiguation)
