= Carreón =

Carreón or Carreon is a common Hispanic surname. It may refer to:

== People ==
- Alfonso Nava Carreón, Bishop of the modern Diocese of Thizica from 1969 to 1990
- Cam Carreon (1937–1987), American Major League Baseball player
- Charles Carreon (born 1956), American lawyer
- Francisco Carreón (1868–?), Filipino military leader
- Luis Arturo Hernández Carreón (born 1968), Mexican footballer
- Mark Carreon (born 1963), American Major League baseball player
- Phil Carreón (1923–2010), American big band leader from Los Angeles
- Lara and Sara Carreon, characters in the Philippine television drama series Impostora

== See also ==
- Carrion (disambiguation)
- Carry On (disambiguation)
