= Gengahr =

English indie rock band

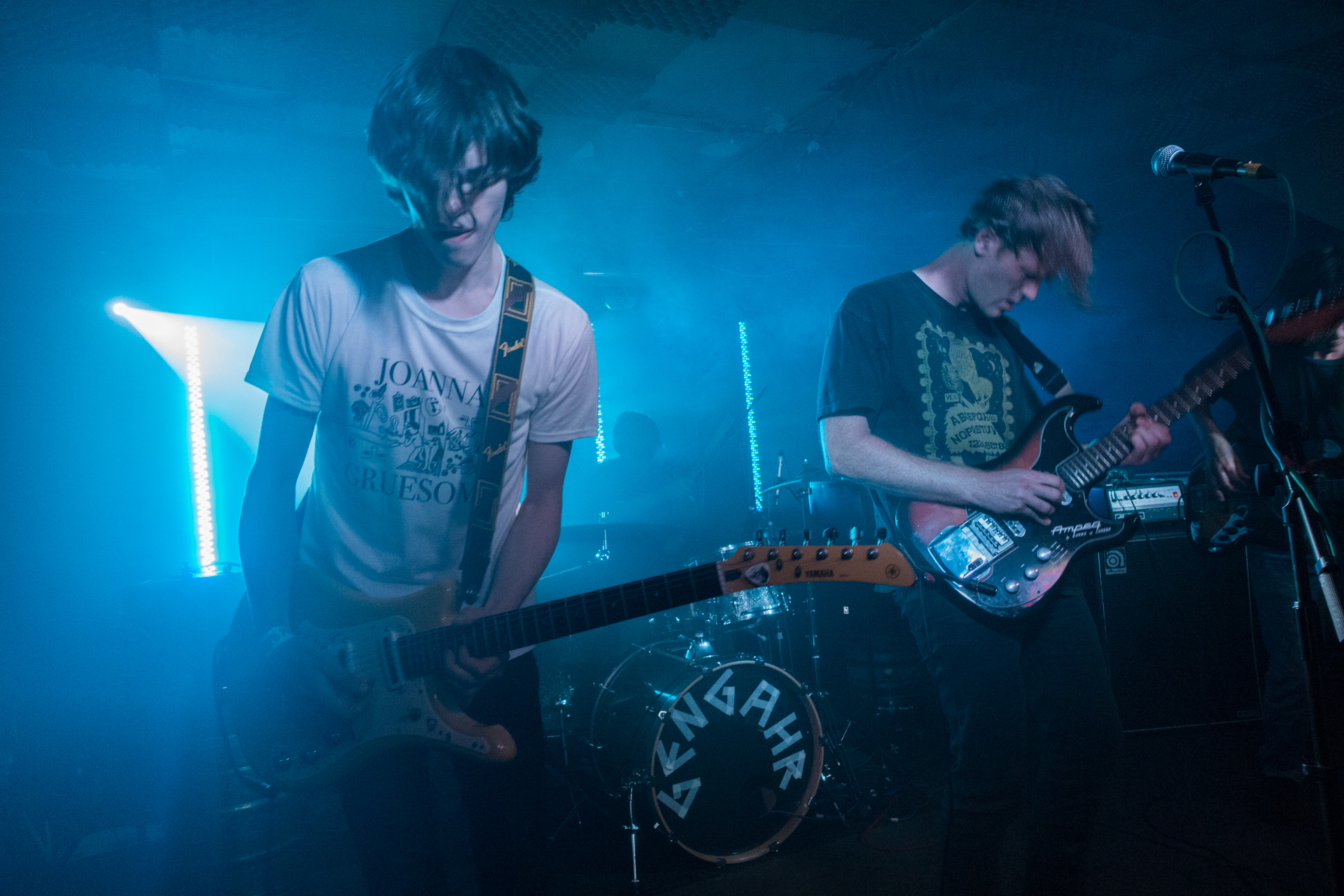
- Gengahr supporting Alvvays at Birthdays in London

Background information
- Origin: London, England
- Genres: Dream pop; indie rock; psychedelic rock
- Years active: 2013–present
- Labels: Transgressive, Liberator Music
- Members: Felix Bushe; John Victor; Hugh Schulte; Danny Ward

Gengahr are an English indie rock band, formed in 2013 at Stoke Newington School in Hackney, London.

Though originally named RES, they were forced to rename after discovering an artist already called RES on iTunes. Their new name is a play on Gengar, one of the original Pokémon. Their debut album, A Dream Outside, was released on 15 June 2015. In October 2017 it was announced their second album, Where Wildness Grows, would be released on 9 March 2018.

After BBC Radio 1 DJ Huw Stephens played their first single, "Fill My Gums With Blood" on his radio show, the band were invited to perform at the Introducing stage at the 2014 Glastonbury Festival.

== Critical reception ==
A Dream Outside received positive reviews from most music critics. At Metacritic, which assigns a normalised rating out of 100 to reviews from mainstream critics, the album received an average score of 79, based on 10 reviews, which indicates "almost entirely favourable reviews". Rhian Daly of NME described A Dream Outside as "an oddly soothing blend of dark romance and gentle psychedelia."

Gwilym Mumford of The Guardian praised the album as being subtly refined and "psychpop with heavy emphasis on the pop."

Haydon Spenceley of Clash Magazine wrote, "It might be jumping the gun a bit to call them the 'saviours of British guitar music', or anything along those lines, but it must surely rank amongst the finest guitar-driven debut album to be coughed up by British music thus far in 2015."

== Discography ==
=== Studio albums ===
Title	Details
A Dream Outside	Released: 15 June 2015; Label: Transgressive; Formats: CD, digital download, vinyl
Where Wildness Grows	Released: 9 March 2018; Label: Transgressive; Formats: CD, digital download, vinyl
Sanctuary	Released: 31 January 2020; Label: Liberator Music; Formats: CD, digital download, vinyl, cassette
Red Sun Titans	Released: 9 June 2023; Label: Liberator Music; Formats: CD, digital download, vinyl, cassette

=== Singles ===
Single	Year	Album
"Fill My Gums with Blood"	2014	A Dream Outside
"She's a Witch"	2015	A Dream Outside
"Heavenly Maybe"	2019	Sanctuary
"Under the Skin"	2021	Non-album single
"A Ladder"	2023	Red Sun Titans
"In the Moment"	2023	Red Sun Titans
