= Dead Body (film) =

- Directed by: Kaz Rahman
- Written by: Kaz Rahman
- Produced by: Kaz Rahman; Li-Yun Chu
- Starring: Husain Naqvi; Ted Hurban; Katia Ustinova; E. F. Morrill
- Cinematography: Yuan-Chung Hsu
- Edited by: Li-Yun Chu
- Music by: Marcus Quin; Hédi Hurban
- Release date: 2002
- Running time: 40 minutes
- Countries: Canada; USA
- Language: English

Dead Body is a 2002 short film by Kaz Rahman.

== Synopsis ==
Hassan, a funeral poet, is going through writer's block. Sitting at his desk in a small cramped room with his girlfriend lying on a mattress he leaves for some 'air' – instead he drifts and deviates into much more including an endless procession of chewing gum, a rotund Hungarian 'delivery man' and a sexy Russian woman. Hassan's journey has a metaphysical aspect to it and life in this surreal world is focused on the strange work, anxiety and humour that hovers over death.

== Cast ==
- Husain Naqvi as Hassan
- Ted Hurban as Laszlo
- Katia Ustinova as Sveta
- Jean Burns as Girlfriend
- E. F. Morrill as Dead Body
