= Salaat (film) =

- Directed by: Kaz Rahman
- Written by: Kaz Rahman
- Produced by: Kaz Rahman
- Starring: Hédi Hurban; Sara Rahman; Nasreen; Umran Yazici; Zainulvara Zaheer
- Cinematography: Kaz Rahman
- Edited by: Kaz Rahman
- Music by: Hédi Hurban
- Production company: Charminar Films
- Release date: 2010
- Running time: 74 minutes
- Countries: Canada; India; USA

Salaat is a 2010 art film by Kaz Rahman.

== Synopsis ==
Five different women walk, ride and work through the day and each performs one of the five Muslim prayers Fajr (sunrise), Zohar (mid-day), Asr (afternoon), Maghrib (sunset) and Isha (evening). The film begins with 'Isha' and ends the next day at 'Maghrib' with each prayer being performed in real time amidst stunning settings. This structure also offers a glimpse at the beauty, stress and contradictions of people interacting throughout the day.

== Cast ==
- Hédi Hurban as Zohar Lady
- Nasreen as Isha Lady
- Umran Yazici as Fajr Lady
- Sara Rahman as Asr Lady
- Zainulvara Zaheer as Maghrib Lady

== Screenings ==
Salaat was screened at Melwood Screening Room at Pittsburgh Filmmakers and The Andy Warhol Museum in Pittsburgh, USA; Salar Jung Museum at Hyderabad and India Habitat Center at New Delhi in India and as an installation at the 4th Video Arte Festival in Camaguey, Cuba .

== Reception ==
Faisal M. Naim wrote in The Hindu "Kaz Rehman has very beautifully depicted the bonding of mankind with its creator in his film Salaat."
