= Cadaver (disambiguation) =

A cadaver is a dead human body.

Cadaver may also refer to:

- cadaver tomb, tomb featuring an effigy in the form of a decomposing body
- Cadaver (video game), a video game
- Cadaver (WebDAV client), a command-line WebDAV client for Unix
- Cadaver (band), a Norwegian death metal band
- Cadaver (Demonata), a demon in The Demonata
- Cadaver (2020 film), a Norwegian horror, also known as Kadaver
- Cadaver (2022 film), an Indian thriller
- Cadaver, a 2007 South Korean horror film also known as The Cut
- Cadaver, a 2018 film also known as The Possession of Hannah Grace in some countries
- slang for a "dead" B.E.A.M robot
- Cadaver Society, a secret society at Washington and Lee University

== See also ==
- Cadavres, a Canadian film
- Carcass (disambiguation)
- Carrion (disambiguation)
- Corpse (disambiguation)
- Dead body
