= Stupeflip =

French music group

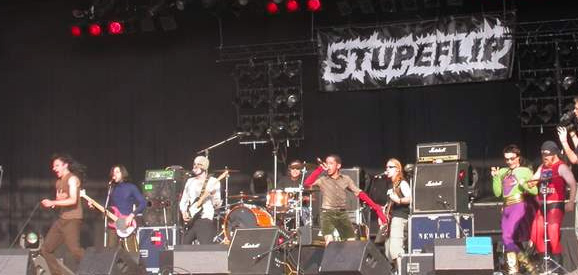
- Stupeflip at a 2003 concert

Background information
- Origin: Paris, France
- Genres: Hip hop; punk rock; synthpop
- Years active: 2000–present
- Labels: Vorston & Limantell; Jive Records; Etic System
- Members: Julien Barthélémy; Stéphane Bellenger; Jean-Paul Michel
- Website: stupeflip.com

Stupeflip (French pronunciation: [stypeflip]) is a French hip hop band formed in 2000, composed of Julien Barthélémy, Stéphane Bellenger and Jean-Paul Michel. Their style can be described as a mix of hip hop, punk rock and synthpop.

Stupeflip members are known by their stage personas: Julien Barthélémy as King Ju and Pop Hip, Stéphane Bellenger as Cadillac and Jean-Paul Michel as MC Saló. These characters and the band itself are part of an elaborate fictional universe.

== History ==
The band rose to fame with its single "Je fume pu d'shit" in 2003 on their first, eponymous album Stupeflip. After having released their two first albums on BMG, the label decided to stop their contract in 2006 after the poor sales of Stup Religion. After a hiatus, the band then began auto-producing themselves, releasing The Hypnoflip Invasion in 2011.

For their fourth album, Stup Virus, Stupeflip began soliciting financial support on the crowdfunding platform Ulule. The crowdfunding campaign was a huge success, with the original stretch goal of €40,000 being raised in just two hours. The campaign ended with a total of €427,972, making it the biggest crowdfunding effort for a band in Europe. Stup Virus was released on 3 March 2017.

== Discography ==
- 2003: Stupeflip
- 2005: Stup Religion
- 2011: The Hypnoflip Invasion
- 2012: Terrora!! (EP)
- 2017: Stup Virus
- 2022: Stup Forever
- 2024: Sons2Ouf!!
