= Deccani Souls =

- Directed by: Kaz Rahman
- Written by: Kaz Rahman
- Produced by: Kaz Rahman
- Starring: M.A. Siddiq; Sathya Bhama; H.K.S. Babu
- Cinematography: Kaz Rahman
- Edited by: Kaz Rahman
- Music by: Hédi Hurban
- Production company: Charminar Films
- Release date: 27 April 2012
- Running time: 106 minutes
- Countries: Canada; India; USA
- Languages: Urdu; English

Deccani Souls is a 2012 art film written and directed by Kaz Rahman. It tells the story of three characters: Hamza, a traveller from an unknown land; Babu, a census collector and Siddiq, an Urdu poet struggling with writer's block as they wander through Hyderabad and are unknowingly connected by the history of Operation Polo.

== Cast ==
- M.A. Siddiq as Siddiq
- Sathya Bhama as Sathya
- H.K.S. Babu as Babu
- Mr. Sultan as Mr. Sultan
- Mr. Syed as Mr. Syed
- Kaz Rahman as Hamza

== Production ==
The film was shot in Hyderabad and Bidar in India and in Ontario, Canada.

The details of Operation Polo mentioned in the film are taken from the Sunderlal report.

== Screenings ==
Deccani Souls was screened at The Hollywood Theater in Pittsburgh, USA. on 14 June 2012. It was screened at the Transmissions Film Festival in New Delhi, India and was later screened to public at Cochin, Thrissur, Kozhikode, Hyderabad and Mumbai.

The film was screened as part of the 31st Three Rivers Film Festival in Pittsburgh, USA in November 2012.
