= Plaza Inter =

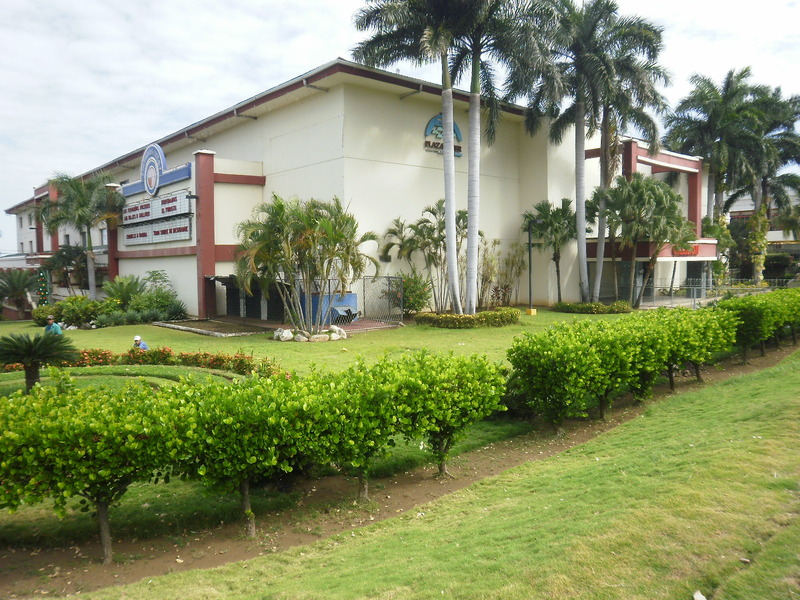
- Location: Managua, Nicaragua
- Coordinates: 12°08′40″N 86°16′26″W
- Opened: December 16, 1998
- Developer: Nica Eastern Development
- Manager: Nica Eastern Development
- Owner: Nica Eastern Development
- Num. of stores: 65
- Num. of anchor tenants: 2
- Floor area: 16,000 m^{2} (170,000 sq ft)
- Floors: 4
- Website: plazaintermall.com.ni

Plaza Inter is a shopping center in Managua, Nicaragua, developed and operated by the Taiwanese company Nica Eastern Development, Inc. The shopping center is home to 65 stores, a food court, a supermarket and a movie theater.

== History ==
The Plaza Inter shopping center is located next to the Hotel Crowne Plaza in Managua's old center. The mall, built and operated by a group of Taiwanese investors, started operations in 1998.

Plaza Inter has an open space on the second floor for concerts and fairs, called Plaza Maya.

There was a branch of Honduras-based Carrión however it closed in 2019 due to the downturn in the economy.

== Gallery ==
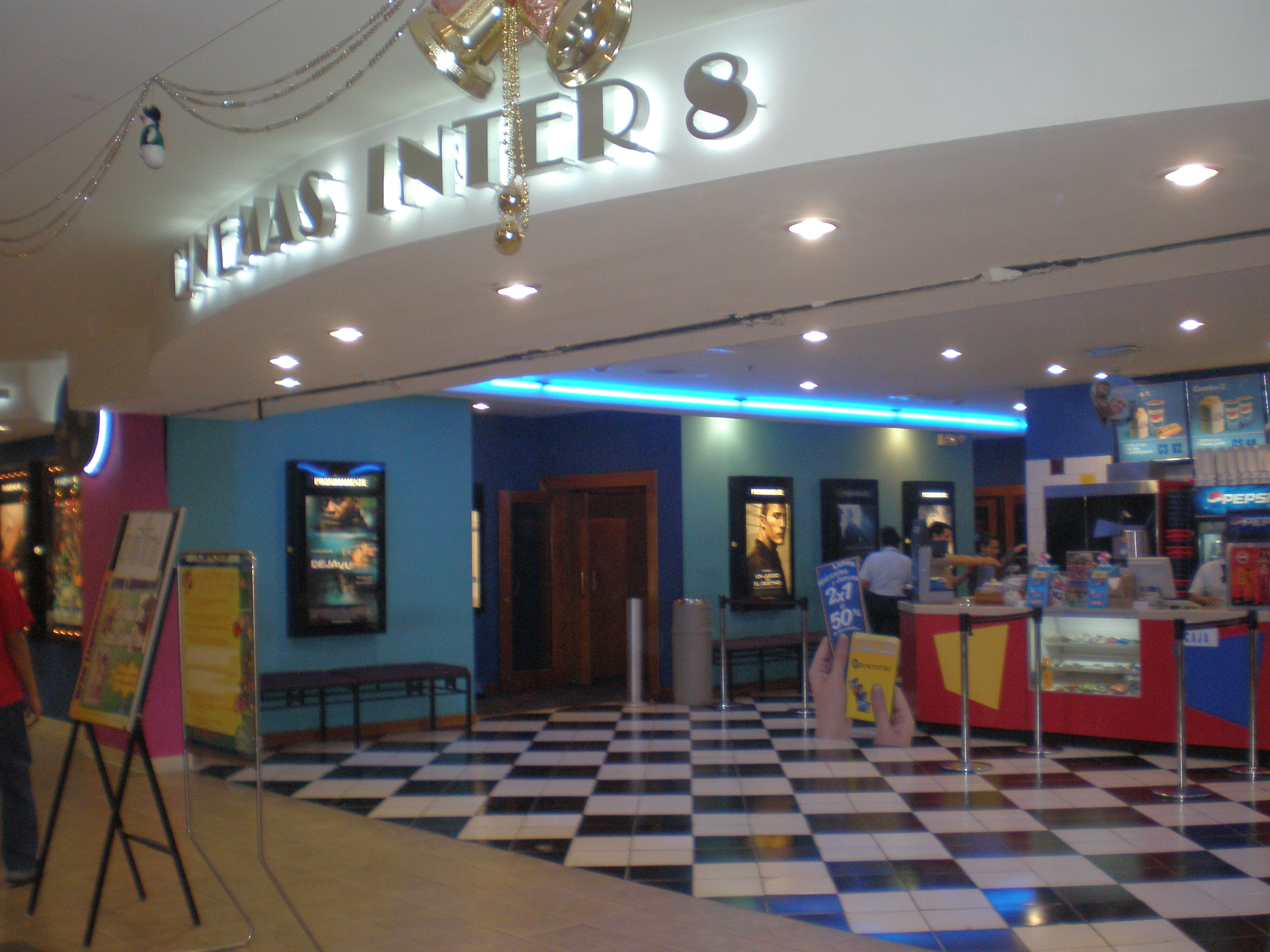
Cinemas Inter movie teather on the fourth floor.

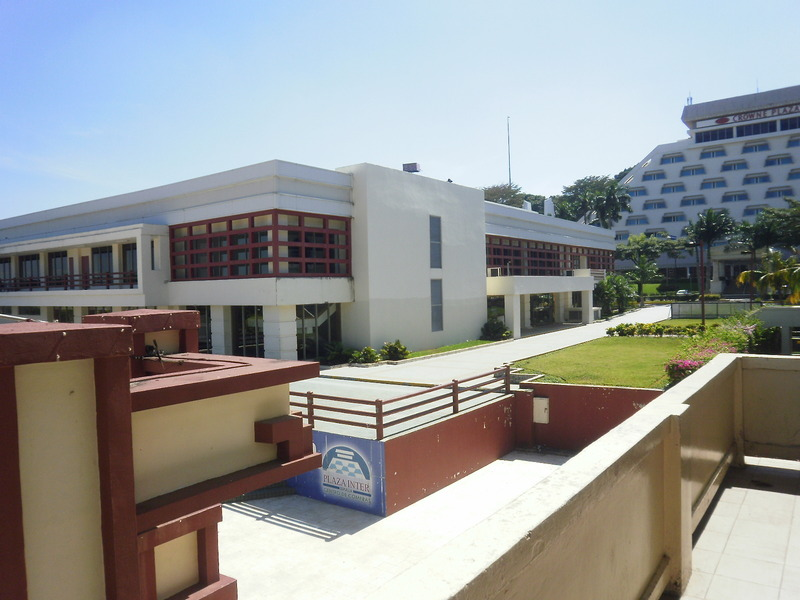
View of Plaza Maya. Hotel Crowne Plaza Managua and Convention Center in the background.
