= Carcass =

Carcass or Carcase (both pronounced /ˈkɑːrkəs/) may refer to:

- Dressed carcass, the body of a livestock animal ready for butchery, after removal of skin, visceral organs, head, feet etc.
- Carrion, the decaying dead body of an animal or human being, also called a carcass.
- The structural system or frame of a structure, especially one not normally seen
- Carcass saw, a type of backsaw

== Arts and entertainment ==
- Carcass (band), a British extreme metal band
- Carcass (G.I. Joe), a fictional character
- Have His Carcase, a British crime novel

== Military ==
- Carcass (projectile), a type of incendiary ammunition designed to be fired from a cannon
- HMS Carcass, three ships of the Royal Navy
- Carcass, in the US Navy, a repairable component that is depot-level repairable (DLR), but not ready-for-issue (NRFI)

== Places ==
- Carcass Island, one of the Falkland Islands
- Krkavče, a village in Slovenia

== See also ==
- Cadaver (disambiguation)
- Carrion (disambiguation)
- Corpse (disambiguation)
