= Jorge Carrión =

Spanish writer and literary critic

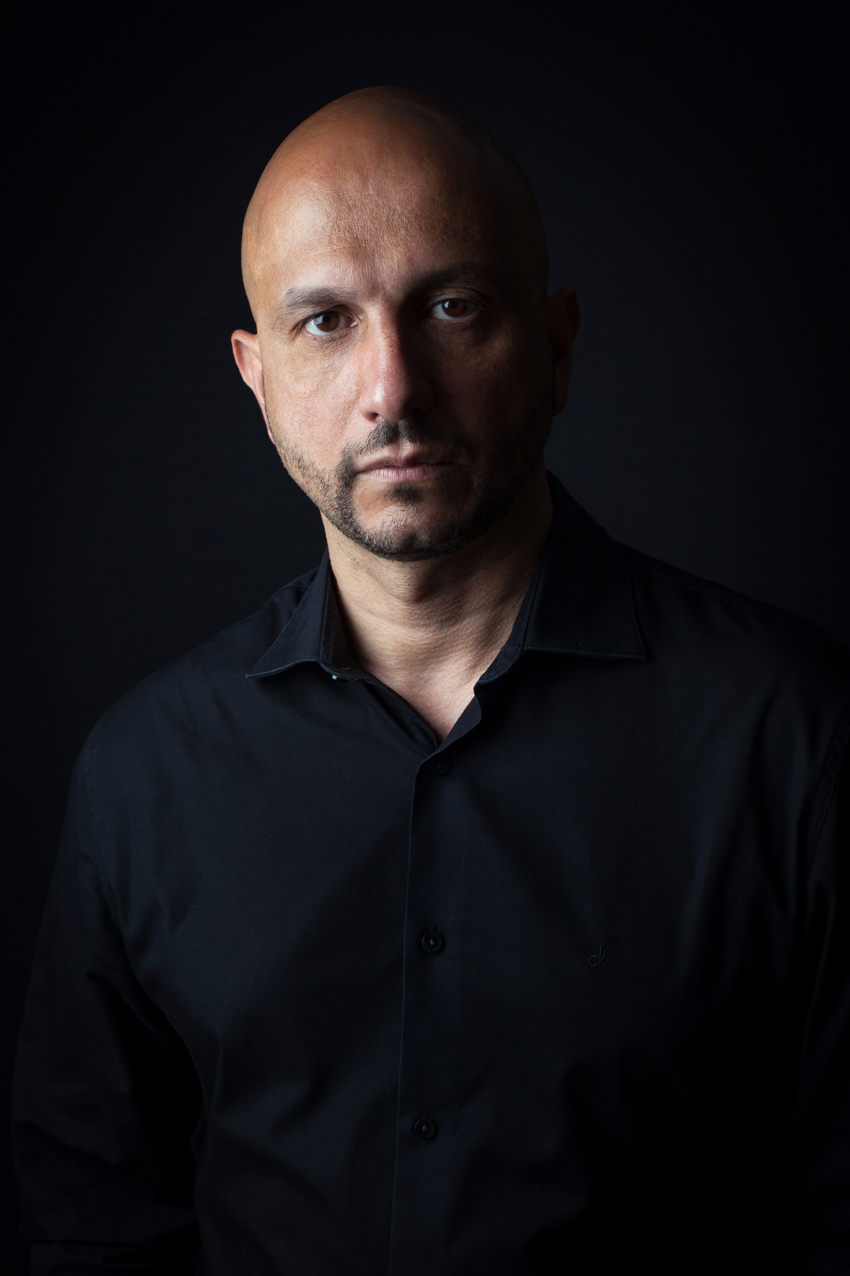
- Born: Jorge Carrión Gálvez; 1976 (age 49–50); Tarragona, Spain
- Education: Pompeu Fabra University
- Writing career
- Language: es
- Genres: non-fiction, Novel

Jorge Carrión (Tarragona, Spain – 1976) is a Spanish writer, cultural critic, and director of the Master in Literary Creation at the Pompeu Fabra University. His published books include the non-fiction works Bookshops (2013) and Barcelona: Book of Passageways (2017), and the novels The Dead (2010), The Orphans (2014), and The Tourists (2015). He writes in the Spanish edition of The New York Times, and he's also a collaborator in international media as the National Geographic magazine, El País, and La Vanguardia.

== Early life ==
Carrión comes from a family of Andalusian immigrants in Catalonia. His father was a worker at a telephone company, and they didn't own books.

== Career ==
From 2000 to 2005, Jorge Carrion was a member of the editorial board of the defunct magazine Lateral. He co-directed the literary journal Quimera, and he's been a contributor to the Spanish newspaper La Vanguardia for fifteen years. His works have been translated into several languages, included Chinese, Portuguese, Italian, German, French, Polish and English.

For writing Bookshops: A Reader's History, Carrión visited over 1,000 bookstores and libraries around the world. He uses to remark the importance of bookshops in a post-digital era. He points out that people are reconnecting to the material. However, humanity is transitioning from anthropocentrism to codigocentrism.

== Books Translated into English ==
- Against Amazon: and Other Essays
- Bookshops: A Reader's History
