= Where Wildness Grows =

Studio album by Gengahr
- Released: 9 March 2018
- Length: 48:43
- Label: Transgressive Records

Gengahr chronology
A Dream Outside (2015)	Where Wildness Grows (2018)	Sanctuary (2020)

Professional ratings
Aggregate scores
Source	Rating
Metacritic	62/100
Review scores
Source	Rating
DIY	4/5 stars
Dork	4/5 stars
Drowned in Sound	2/10
The Line of Best Fit	8/10
MusicOMH	4/5 stars

Where Wildness Grows is the second studio album by English indie rock band Gengahr. It was released on 9 March 2018 under Transgressive Records.

== Singles ==
On 21 September 2017, Gengahr announced the first single from the album, "Carrion". The second single, along with the announce of the new album, "Mallory" was released on 16 October 2017. On 9 November 2017, the music video for "Mallory" was released. On 18 January 2018, the third single "Before Sunrise" was released.

== Critical reception ==
Where Wildness Grows was met with "generally favourable" reviews from critics. At Metacritic, which assigns a weighted average rating out of 100 to reviews from mainstream publications, this release received an average score of 62, based on 7 reviews.

=== Accolades ===
Accolades for Where Wildness Grows
Publication	Accolade	Rank	Ref.
NME	NME's Top 100 Albums of 2018	96	

== Track listing ==
Where Wildness Grows track listing
No.	Title	Length
1.	"Before Sunrise"	3:57
2.	"Mallory"	3:19
3.	"Is This How You Love"	3:09
4.	"I'll Be Waiting"	3:48
5.	"Where Wildness Grows"	4:57
6.	"Blind Truth"	3:54
7.	"Carrion"	4:33
8.	"Burning Air"	3:11
9.	"Left in Space"	3:33
10.	"Pull Over"	4:20
11.	"Rising Tides"	5:02
12.	"Whole Again"	5:00

== Charts ==
Chart performance for Where Wildness Grows
Chart (2018)	Peak position
UK Independent Albums (OCC)	20
