= HMS Carcass =

Three ships of the Royal Navy have borne the name HMS Carcass, named after the carcass, an early form of incendiary bomb or shell:

- HMS Carcass (1695) was an 8-gun bomb vessel launched in 1695 and sold in 1713.
- HMS Carcass (1740) was a 14-gun bomb vessel launched in 1740 and sold in 1748.
- HMS Carcass (1759) was an 8-gun bomb vessel launched in 1759 and sold in 1784.
