= Stupeflip (album) =

2003 album by Stupeflip

- Album cover

Studio album by Stupeflip
- Released: 8 January 2003
- Genres: Punk rock; hip-hop
- Length: 62:28
- Languages: French, English
- Label: BMG

Stupeflip chronology
Stupeflip (2003)	Stup Religion (2005)

Singles from Stupeflip
- 1. "Je fume pu d'shit" Released: 2002; 2. "Comme les zot" Released: 2002

Stupeflip is the first album by the French hip-hop group Stupeflip. It was released 8 January 2003 by Bertelsmann Music Group. After releasing a cassette of songs in 2001, they signed with BMG. The tracks "Je fume pu d'shit" and "Comme les zot" were released as singles. "Je fume pu d'shit", which features Jacno, peaked at 95 on the French charts in 2002. While promoting the album the band had several controversial interview appearances.

The album sold 35,000 copies by 2005. Stupeflip received praise from reviewers, with several comparing it to the works of Beastie Boys or the punk-rock band Bérurier Noir. Several reviewers positively compared it against "Je fume pu d'shit", with many reviewers noting the album as a whole as much darker than that song, which they called comparatively silly. The album was complimented for its tone and lyrics.

== Background and production ==
It was the first album created by Stupeflip. The band performed under masked personas, led by "King Ju" (Julien Barthélémy), who wears a hood over his head. The other two members are MC Salo and Cadillac; all three were former students at the École nationale supérieure des arts décoratifs. After releasing a demo cassette of songs in 2001, Barthélémy gave it to a neighbor who was a musician, part of Bosco, who sent his demo to record labels. Stupeflip signed to BMG with creative freedom in exchange for a single, "Je fume pu d'shit".

Most of the music and lyrics were done by Barthélémy, and the album was produced by him with the audio editor SoundEdit. Cadillac worked on production of the music videos, and MC Salo worked on the band's graphics.

== Composition and themes ==
Stupeflip is a punk rock and hip-hop album, though incorporates elements of French variety music, electronic music and pop music. It is especially influenced by American hip-hop music. Barthélémy described the album as "a strange project, hip-hop, metal", but that he disliked labeling it. The music discusses a mythology and story elaborated upon in the lyrics and the interludes, which is often left vague. "Pop Hip" is King Ju's deluded alter ego, whose songs are more rock focused and who functions as his "punching bag", e.g. in "Carry On". Some tracks combine cheerful sounding beats with contrasting lyrics, many of which are self-deprecating and self-referential, with usage of sampling. A common theme for the album is vengeance, or settling scores, as well as frustration and pessimism, though many tracks are also comedic or skits. Some of the tracks also criticize journalists.

"Je fume pu d'shit" (lit. 'I No Longer Smoke Weed') features the French singer Jacno and is about smoking weed. It is contrasted with its following track, "J'refume du d'shit" (lit. 'I'm Smoking Weed Again'), which presents similar topics in a more depressing manner. "Comme les zot", also released as a single, features quotes from variety singers, including Patrick Bruel and Michel Berger, which they use to mock them. "L.E.C.R.O.U." and "Annexion de la Région Sud" feature the rapper Mangu. Barthélémy said in an interview that for the album he "would have liked a rounder sound, but it had to remain quite raw, and I like high notes, the crrr crrr". He aimed for a rougher sound like the American heavy metal band Pantera, in contrast to "the French touch and all those bourgeois sons who made house or lounge music for advertising clubs with models by the pool".

== Release and promotion ==
The singles "Je fume pu d'shit" and "Comme les zot" were released in early 2002. The cover of the "Je fume pu d'shit" single features a cartoon of a man sawing his arm off with a smile. A music video for it was released, filmed on camcorder. In the lead-up to the release of the album, Stupeflip performed at concerts at Printemps de Bourges, La Boule Noire, and Transmusicales; they also criticized the press and the idea of cooperating with it, saying for the principle they should "remain an enigma, we shouldn't do interviews or concerts" but that since they did not have the money they were doing it anyway. Interviews with the band in the lead-up often involved insults and controversy. In one interview, they stated that "If you really want to limit Stupeflip to a slogan, we're somewhere between Isabelle Boulay and Public Enemy... Or between the Residents, Wu-Tang, and hard rock."

The album was released through Bertelsmann Music Group on 8 January 2003. It was promoted through word of mouth. The track "Je fume pu d'shit", released as a single prior to the album, peaked at 95 on the French charts in 2002. The album sold 35,000 copies by 2005, mostly among the demographic aged 18 to 25. The cover art was drawn by Barthélémy.

== Reception ==
The album received generally positive reviews. Olivier Hornier writing for the Swiss newspaper Le Temps called the album "unclassifiable" but also "the most spectacular and entertaining hold-up of 2003". He praised the band's "brilliant mastery of musical codes" and their alternation between "strokes of genius and tricks". The reviewer for Albumrock gave it a 4/5, calling it a "rich, dark, gloomy and sick first album", "far from being the stupid, baseless joke that one might believe it to be". They also called the tracks "schizophrenic" in their tone, with a wide range from song to song, ranging from apathetic to contempt and lyrics that made you smile to ones that made you uneasy. Le Monde's Stéphane Davet wrote that it was "as if [the band] escaped from a trashy comic strip". Several reviewers compared Stupeflip in their sound and style to the Beastie Boys, or the punk-rock band Bérurier Noir. Les Inrockuptibles' JD Beauvallet called it combative in its pessimism, that it "reeks of hatred and disgust festering in a small room", particularly praising the track "L.E.C.R.O.U." Bruno Masi of Libération was more critical, saying that it represented merely "a curiosity from the last century", that they were clever enough to entertain a younger audience while being "nihilistic and regressive".

Hornier called the pre-release single of "Je fume pu d'shit" misleading compared to the full album; the Albumrock reviewer called "Je fume pu d'shit" "hilarious and shitty", though Davet called it "excellent". Beauvallet said the song, though a hit, would be both a "blessing and a curse" for Stupeflip, confusing their image due to its silliness, compared to the album, which he said was much darker. Hornier also positively compared the album against that track, saying that it was not the same kind of childish work as that song but that the album "stuns with its darkness, its cries of despair and its sick atmospheres" as well as being "ironic and hilarious". Albumrock also said, naming "The Cadillac Theory" as an example, that some tracks were so stupid that if there was a "deeper meaning behind it, it's clearly imperceptible". Davet said that behind the songs on the album that seemed comedic or simply edgy there was "an all-out derision that flirts with a real darkness" and bitter and frustrated themes.

== Track listing ==
Stupeflip
No.	Title	Length
1.	"Le Crou ne mourra jamais" (Intro)	1:47
2.	"Stupeflip"	3:07
3.	"Présentation du crou"	1:12
4.	"Je fume pu d'shit"	3:17
5.	"J'refume du shit"	4:22
6.	"Explication n° 1"	0:51
7.	"L'épouvantable épouvantail"	5:02
8.	"Naissance de la région sud"	0:45
9.	"Les Monstres"	3:44
10.	"Crou Nostalgie"	1:48
11.	"Avertissement"	0:11
12.	"Carry On"	3:35
13.	"Comme les zot"	1:31
14.	"Média terror"	0:47
15.	"L.E.C.R.O.U."	5:46
16.	"Création de la deuxième ère du Stup"	0:56
17.	"A bas la hiérarchie"	4:07
18.	"La bavure de Pop Hip"	4:56
19.	"The Cadillac Theory"	1:16
20.	"Passe mon truc"	3:16
21.	"Stupeflip" (Home version)	3:08
22.	"Annexion de la Région Sud"	7:23
Total length:		62:28
