= Metrocentro Managua =

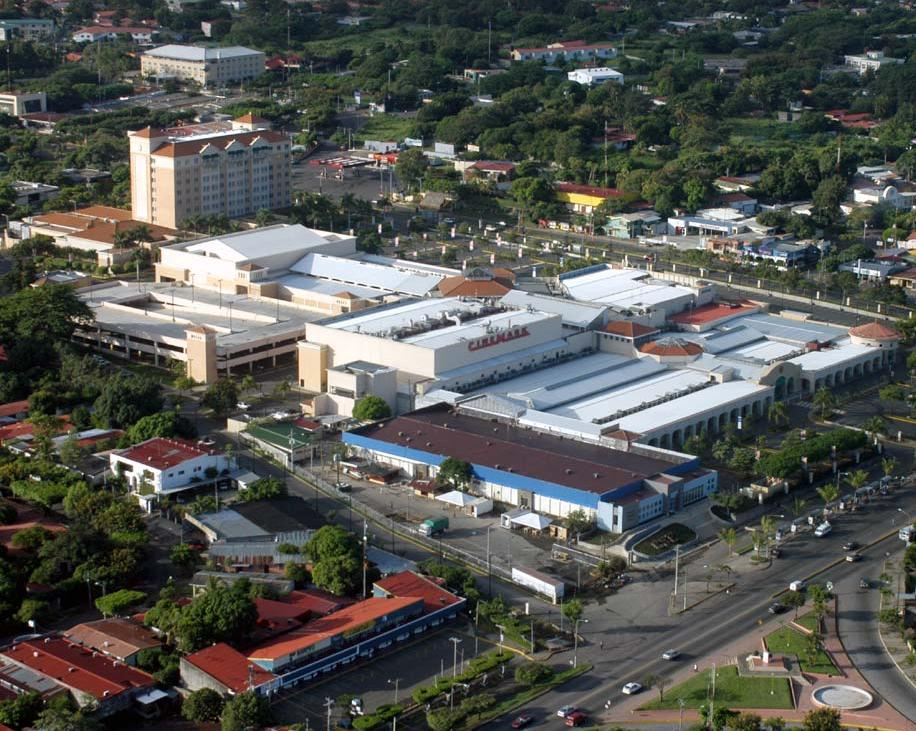
- Location: Managua, Nicaragua
- Coordinates: 12°07′41″N 86°15′53″W
- Opened: 1974
- Developer: Grupo Roble
- Manager: Grupo Roble
- Owner: Grupo Roble
- Num. of stores: 120
- Num. of anchor tenants: 3
- Floor area: 50,000 m^{2} (540,000 sq ft)
- Floors: 3
- Website: metrocentro.com/m/metrocentro-managua/c/todas-las-tiendas

Metrocentro Managua is a shopping center in Managua, Nicaragua, developed and operated by the Salvadorean Grupo Roble. The shopping center is home to 120 stores, a food court, a supermarket and a movie theater.

== History ==
The construction of the first phase of the shopping center was finished in 1974. Due to the Revolution and Civil War of 1979, further development was halted until 1998 when it was renovated and extended with more store space and the building of the four-star Hotel Real InterContinental Metrocentro Managua.

In 2004, a third renovation took place, adding more than 25,000 m^{2} (270,000 sq ft) of new commercial space and a two-level parking space.

== Gallery ==
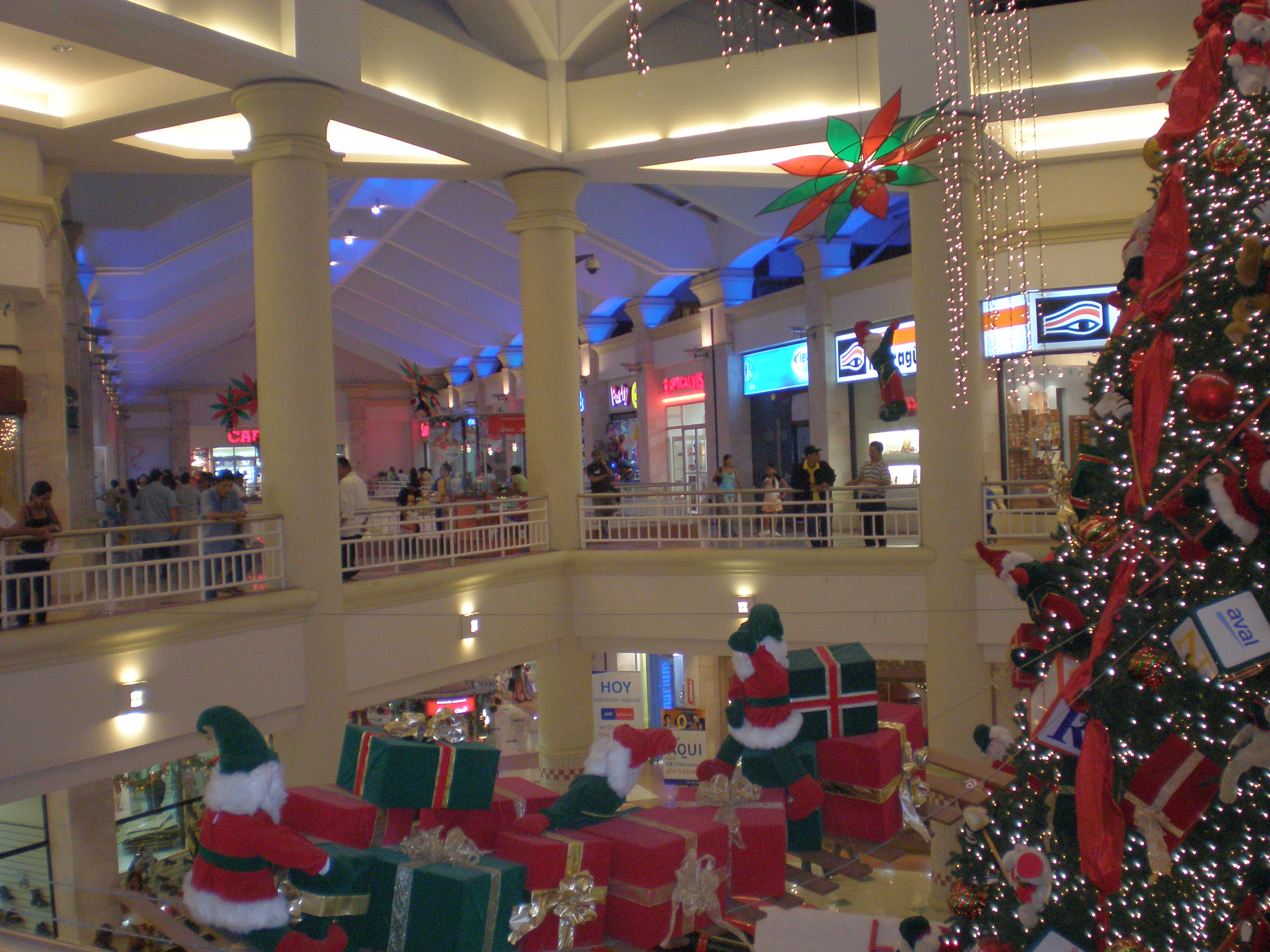
Metrocentro Managua mall during Christmas, 2006.

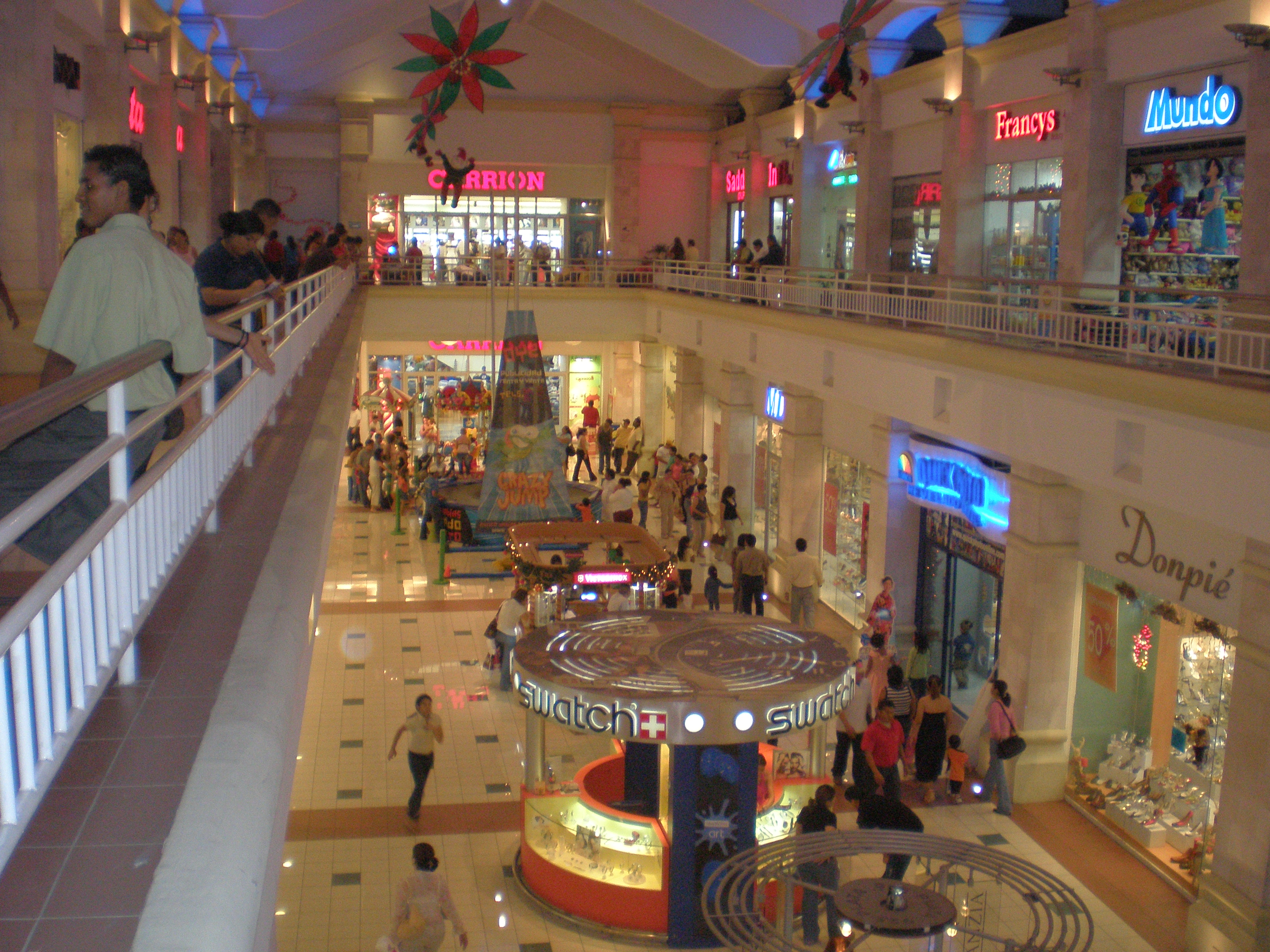
Third phase of Metrocentro, completed in 2004, with anchor store Carrión.
