= Carrión (department store) =

Department store chain in Central America

Tiendas Carrión
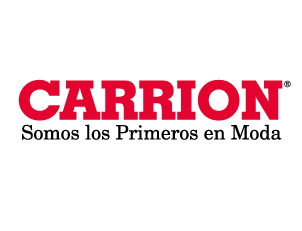
- Company type: Private
- Industry: Department stores
- Founded: 1970
- Headquarters: Honduras
- Area served: Honduras, Guatemala
- Key people: Vicente Carrión (Founder and President) Maria Francisca Galeas de Carrión (Cofounder) Carlos Hernán Carrión (CEO)
- Parent: Grupo Carrion
- Website: tiendascarrion.com

Tiendas Carrión is a chain of department stores in Central America.

It originated in La Ceiba, Honduras in 1970 where it opened under the name Bazar Carrión. It opened in Costa Rica in 2000, in El Salvador in 2003, in Nicaragua in 2004, and in Guatemala in 2005.

In 2012 the company invested US$5 million in a new store in Tegucigalpa.

Despite closing its 6,000 m^{2} store at Multiplaza San José Costa Rica, Carrión expressed an intention at the time to expand in the country and did eventually open a new store in Alajuela in 2015. The company later pulled out of the Costa Rica market.

Victoria Kjær (Miss Universe 2024) visited Tiendas Carrion's City Mall location in San Pedro Sula, Honduras.

== Key people ==
The owner as of 2015 was Vicente Carrión.

== Geographic presence ==
Originated Honduras, and opened in Costa Rica (2000), El Salvador (2003, 2 stores closed 2019), Nicaragua (2004) and Guatemala (2005)

=== Guatemala ===
Source: Facebook page for Carrión Guatemala

- Quetzaltenango
- Zacapa
- Guatemala City
- Coatepeque
- Escuintla
- Puerto Barrios
- Totonicapan
- Chiquimula
- Huehuetenango

=== Honduras ===
In Honduras there are stores in:

- Tegucigalpa, Multiplaza
- San Pedro Sula
- La Ceiba
- Villanueva
- Puerto Cortes
- Siguatepeque
- Comayagua
- Choluteca
- Danli
- Catacamas
- Juticalpa
- Tocoa
- Roatan
- Tela
- Santa Rosa de Copán
- El Progreso
