= Carrion (disambiguation) =

Carrion refers to the carcass of a dead animal.

Carion, Carrion or Carrión may also refer to:

== Geography ==
- Carion, Madagascar, former name of Nandihizana
- Carrión (river), a river in Spain
- Carrión de Calatrava, a municipality in central Spain
- Carrión de los Céspedes, a municipality in southern Spain
- Carrión de los Condes, a municipality in northern Spain

== People ==
- Carrion (surname)
- Carion the Egyptian, 4th-century Egyptian Christian monk

== Animals ==
- Carrion beetle, a family of carnivorous beetles
- Carrion crow (Corvus corone), a bird of western Europe and eastern Asia

== Arts, entertainment, and media ==
=== Fictional entities ===
- Carrion (comics), a villain in Spider-Man comics
- Carrion Road, a fictitious road associated with deaths connected to bullet smuggling, in The Hollow Point (2016)

=== Music ===
- Carrion, former name of Poltergeist (band), a Swiss power thrash metal band
- "Carrion", a song from Fiona Apple's Tidal (album)
- "Carrion" a song from Godflesh's A World Lit Only by Fire (album)
- "Carrion" a song from Parkway Drive's Horizons album
- "Carrion/Apologies to Insect Life", a song by the band British Sea Power
- "Carrion", a song from Deerhunter's Fading Frontier
- "Carrion", a song from Gengahr's Where Wildness Grows
- "Carrion", a song from Kreator's Pleasure to Kill
- "I, Carrion (Icarian)", a song from Hozier’s Unreal Unearth

=== Video game ===
- Carrion (video game), a horror video game

== Businesses ==
- Carrion (department store), based in Honduras, Central America

== See also ==
- Carreon (disambiguation)
- Carry On (disambiguation)
- Dead body
