= H. M. Naqvi =

Pakistani novelist

- Born: 1973 (age 52–53); London
- Occupation: Novelist
- Writing career
- Notable works: Home Boy (2009); The Selected Works of Abdullah the Cossack (2019)
- Website: www.hmnaqvi.com

H. M. Naqvi (born 1973) is a Pakistani novelist based in Karachi. His debut novel Home Boy (2009) won the inaugural DSC Prize for South Asian Literature in 2011. His second novel, The Selected Works of Abdullah the Cossack, was published in 2019.

== Life ==
Naqvi was born in London in 1973 and grew up in Karachi, Pakistan. He graduated from Georgetown University in 1996 with degrees in economics and English literature. While in Washington D.C., he ran a slam poetry venue called the Fifteen Minutes Club and represented Pakistan in the National Poetry Slam in Ann Arbor, Michigan in 1995. His poems were broadcast on NPR and the BBC.

In 1997, he joined the World Bank and spent the following years working in financial services on the East Coast and in Karachi. After leaving that career in 2003, he moved to Cambridge, Massachusetts, where he attended classes in Harvard's English department and later enrolled in the creative writing programme at Boston University, where he worked under National Book Award recipient Ha Jin. While completing his novel, he taught writing at Boston University. He has also taught creative writing at the Lahore University of Management Sciences.

Naqvi moved to Karachi in 2007. In 2010, he was a resident participant in the International Writing Program at the University of Iowa. He has written on contemporary Pakistani art, minorities, and Balochistan for GlobalPost and on Karachi for Forbes. He has appeared on CNN, NPR, and BBC World Service.

== Home Boy (2009) ==
Home Boy was first published in the United States in September 2009 by Crown Books, a division of Random House. The novel follows three young Pakistani men living in New York City in the aftermath of the 11 September 2001 attacks. The New York Times described it as an immigrant narrative, bildungsroman, and New York City novel combined, praising Naqvi's prose for its energy and engagement. Publishers Weekly awarded it a starred review, describing its plot, dialogue, and erudition as making for a stellar debut.

When the novel was published in India in January 2010 by HarperCollins, it reached the top ten of the fiction best-seller list. In January 2010, Naqvi attended the Jaipur Literature Festival. On his American tour, Naqvi gave a performance at the Nuyorican Poets Cafe and read at Harvard University, the Tenement Museum, the Brooklyn Book Festival, and the Asia Society.

The German, Italian, and Portuguese editions of the novel were published in 2010. On 22 January 2011, Home Boy was awarded the inaugural DSC Prize for South Asian Literature, which carries a prize of US$50,000, at a ceremony at the Jaipur Literature Festival.

== The Selected Works of Abdullah the Cossack (2019) ==
Naqvi's second novel, The Selected Works of Abdullah the Cossack, was published in 2019 by Black Cat, an imprint of Grove Atlantic. The novel is narrated by Abdullah, a septuagenarian from a once-prominent Karachi family, and is set against the backdrop of the city's social and cultural transformation. Kirkus Reviews described it as simultaneously a love story, a caper, a family drama, and a farce, finding its central strength in the evocation of Karachi's neighbourhoods, history, and culture. The Wall Street Journal called it a delirious love letter to Karachi, comparing the protagonist to Don Quixote and Ignatius J. Reilly in boldness and verbosity. Ha Jin, under whom Naqvi studied at Boston University, described the novel as completely original in form and sensibility.

== Works ==
- Home Boy: a novel. New York: Shaye Areheart Books, 2009. ISBN 9780307409102
- The Selected Works of Abdullah the Cossack: a novel. New York: Black Cat, 2019. ISBN 9780802146861

== Awards ==
- Ora Mary Phelam Poetry Prize
- DSC Prize for South Asian Literature for Home Boy – Winner (22 January 2011)
