= Violeta Granera =

Nicaraguan sociologist

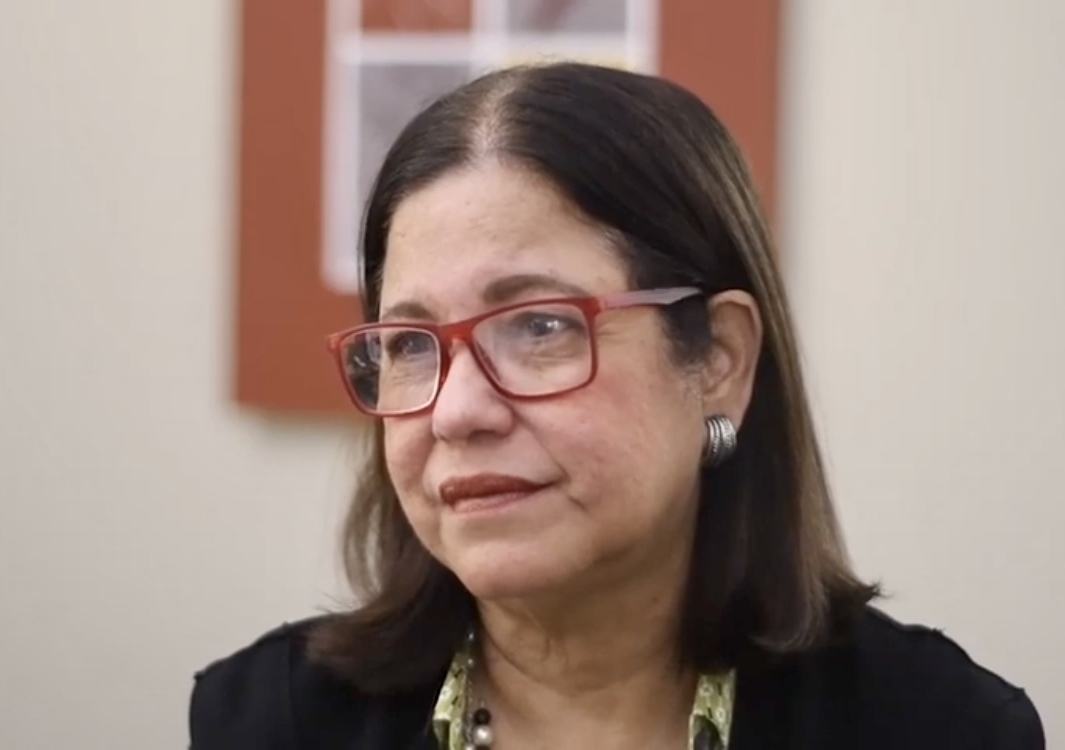
- Granera in 2019
- Born: 1952 or 1953 (age 72–73)
- Occupation: Sociologist
- Children: 5

Violeta Mercedes Granera Padilla (born 1952 or 1953) is a Nicaraguan sociologist, activist and former candidate for vice-president. Granera worked for the World Bank, then in government before joining the civic organization Movement for Nicaragua, where she worked for seven years advocating for transparency and election reform. She resigned to run for vice-president in 2016 with the Independent Liberal Party, but the party was barred from the ballot by court decision. In the wake of the 2018 anti-government protests she became involved in the Blue and White National Unity opposition group, and in the run-up to the 2021 Nicaraguan general election, she was among the opposition leaders arrested.

== Early life ==
Violeta Granera's father, Ramiro Granera, was a Senator in Nicaragua's then-bicameral Congress. A supporter of the Somozas regime, he was assassinated by the Sandinista National Liberation Front during the revolution, leading to Granera's opposition to political violence.

== Career ==
Granera is a sociologist by training. She worked for the World Bank for three years but found it wasn't “her calling”. During the presidency of conservative Enrique Bolaños, Granera served in government on the Council for Social and Economic Planning. In 2007, she joined the Movement for Nicaragua (MpN), where she served as executive director for seven years, organizing advocacy for transparency and other election reform. She resigned in 2016 to become a candidate for vice-president of Nicaragua, representing the Independent Liberal Party (PLI) as the running mate of Luis Callejas. The nomination was short-lived though, as the ticket was barred from the ballot by Nicaraguan Supreme Court decision.

Following the 2018 anti-government protests and police repression thereof, Granera became involved with the Blue White National Unity (UNAB) group protesting President Daniel Ortega's government. In August 2019, the Inter-American Commission on Human Rights granted the request of the Nicaraguan Center for Human Rights (CENIDH) that precautionary measures be implemented to protect Granera and her immediate family, finding “the rights to life and personal integrity of Violeta Mercedes Granera Padilla and her next of kin are in a situation of grave risk.”

On June 8, 2021, following the arrests of four opposition pre-candidates for president in the 2021 Nicaraguan general election, Granera was also arrested, for alleged violations of the controversial Law 1055. Enacted by the FSLN-controlled legislature in December 2020, the “law for the defense of the rights of the people to independence, sovereignty, and self-determination for peace”, called the “Guillotine Law” by critics, allows the government to make accusations of treason without a requirement to produce evidence for the charge.

As with the others arrested, Granera was sentenced to 90 days of preventive detention. On June 24, 2021, the IACHR issued a ruling finding her in an “extremely grave situation. As such, there exists an urgent necessity to adopt measures that avoid irreparable harm to the rights of life and physical integrity” and therefore ordered his release, as well as the release of fellow opposition leaders José Adán Aguerri, Juan Sebastián Chamorro, and Félix Maradiaga. The Court cited lack of information regarding their whereabouts, as well as health concerns and concerns about the conditions under which they are being held. The Nicaraguan government has not complied.

== Personal life ==
Granera has five children; one died in 2013.

== See also ==
- Cristiana Chamorro Barrios
- José Pallais
- Vilma Núñez
