= Michael Healy Lacayo =

Nicaraguan businessman and civic leader (died 2024)

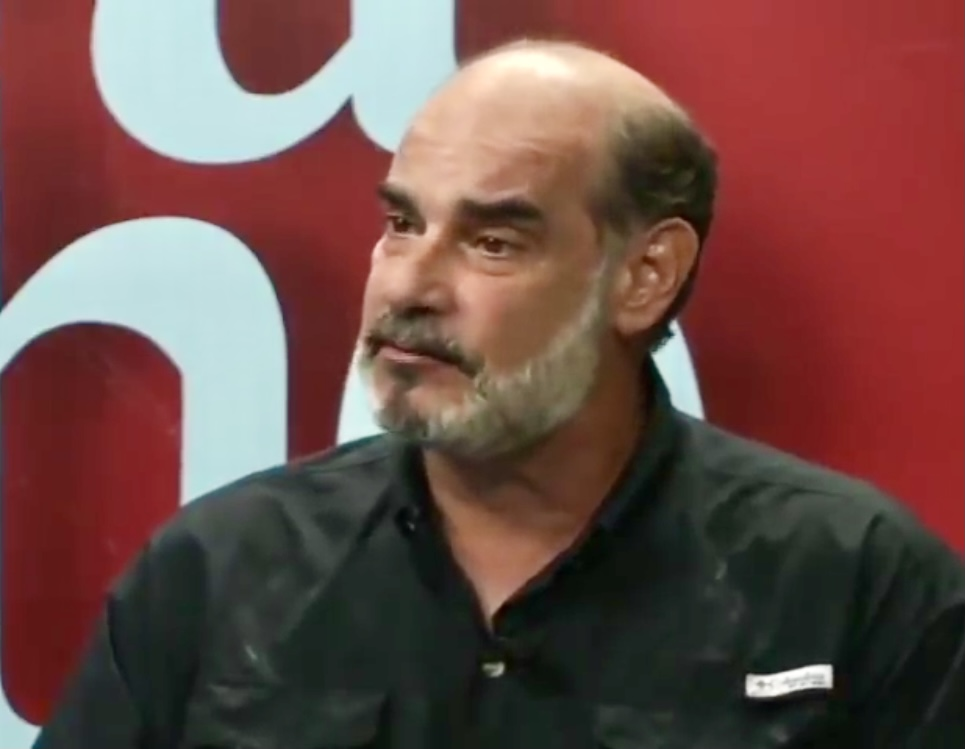
- Healy in 2018

Michael Healy Lacayo (c. 1962 – 25 January 2024) was a Nicaraguan businessman. He was president of the Superior Council for Private Enterprise, Nicaragua’s leading business chamber, from September 2020 until his arrest in October 2021 in a wave of repression of opposition figures by Daniel Ortega’s government in the run-up to the 2021 Nicaraguan presidential election. He was one of 222 prisoners exiled by Ortega in February 2023.

== Business and civic career ==
Michael Healy was president of the Union of Agricultural Producers of Nicaragua (UPANIC), as a sugar cane and banana producer. He was also vice-president of the Superior Council for Private Enterprise (COSEP), the country’s leading business chamber.

In this capacity, Healy joined the 2018 national dialogues following the outbreak of protests against President Daniel Ortega, in which the Inter-American Court of Human Rights (IACHR) reported that at least 328 were killed. Until the unilateral social security reforms that touched off the protests, COSEP had been aligned with Ortega. Healy was a member of the Civic Alliance for Justice and Democracy, an opposition group that emerged from the protests. In August 2018, the IACHR ordered protective measures for Healy.

In September 2020, Healy was elected to a three-year term as president of COSEP.

In October 2021, Healy was arrested on allegations of money laundering and terrorism under Law 1055, three weeks before the 2021 Nicaraguan general election. His predecessor as COSEP president and contender for the presidency of Nicaragua, José Adán Aguerri, had been arrested and held since June 2021 on similar charges, one of dozens of opposition figures Ortega’s administration arrested.

In April 2022, Healy was convicted in a secret trial for which he was not permitted a defense.

After 16 months in prison, Healy was one of 222 prisoners exiled to the United States on 9 February 2023. The Ortega administration subsequently stripped the exiles of their nationality and confiscated their property.

== Personal life and death ==
Healy was born around 1962. He was married to Rossana Argüello, with whom he had three children.

Healy died of a heart attack in Panama, on 25 January 2024, at the age of 61.
