= Superior Council for Private Enterprise =

Nicaraguan business organization

The Superior Council for Private Enterprise (Consejo Superior de la Empresa Privada, or COSEP) is a leading business chamber in Nicaragua. As of September 2020, its president is Michael Healy, elected to a three-year term. He succeeded José Adán Aguerri, who was COSEP’s President for 13 years.

Logo of COSEP

Historically COSEP has been the main organization of Nicaraguan big business, and in the late 20th century was composed of prosperous families from the Pacific coast cities, who dominated commerce and banking.

During the Sandinista revolution (1979–1990), COSEP opposed the Sandinistas’ economic policies. Later, in 1990 when the conservative candidate of the National Opposition Union (UNO), Violeta Barrios de Chamorro, defeated Sandinista Daniel Ortega for president, COSEP was part of the alliance of 14 opposition groups that made up UNO.

When a more pragmatic approach allowed Ortega to be re-elected president in 2006, COSEP worked in cooperation with him. The arrangement, touted the “consensus model” of governance, is said to have led to Nicaragua having "the fastest-growing economy in Central America" and being a "poster child for foreign investment and citizen security in a region known for gangs and unrest". This ended in April 2018 when Ortega's unpopular decree to "unilaterally overhaul the social-security tax system" broke his arrangement with COSEP and precipitated bloody protests. COSEP subsequently joined the Civic Alliance, a broad coalition opposing the government.

In October 2021, Healy and COSEP vice-president Álvaro Vargas were arrested on allegations of money laundering and terrorism under Law 1055, three weeks before the 2021 Nicaraguan general election. Healy’s predecessor, José Adán Aguerri, a pre-candidate in the election for president of Nicaragua, has been held since June 2021 on similar charges, one of 37 opposition figures Daniel Ortega’s administration has arrested.

== Past and current presidents ==
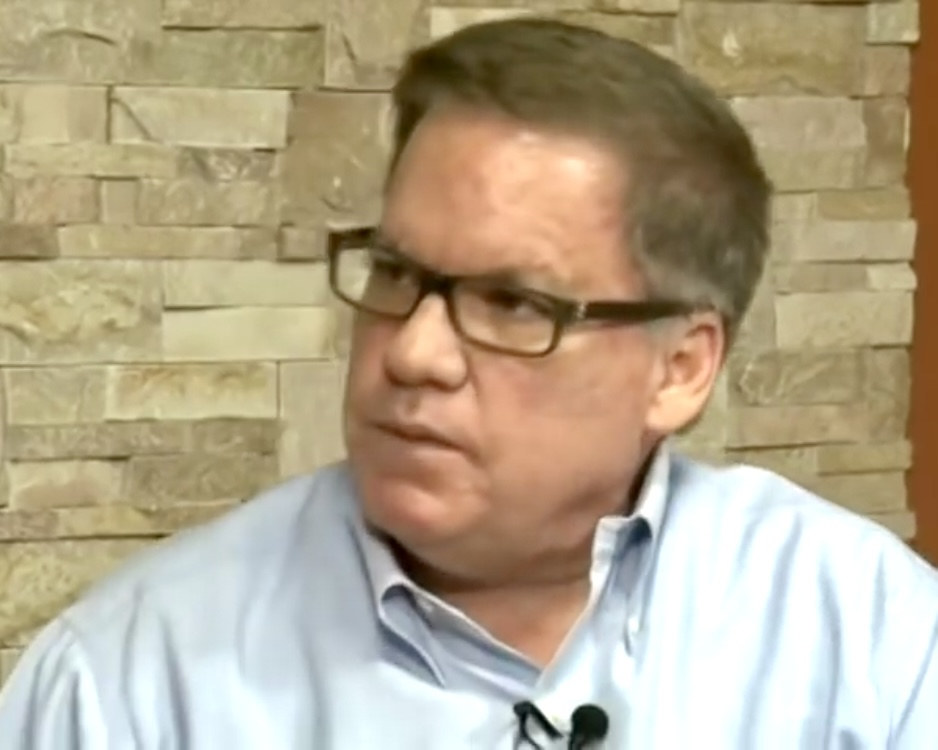
José Adán Aguerri
2007-2020

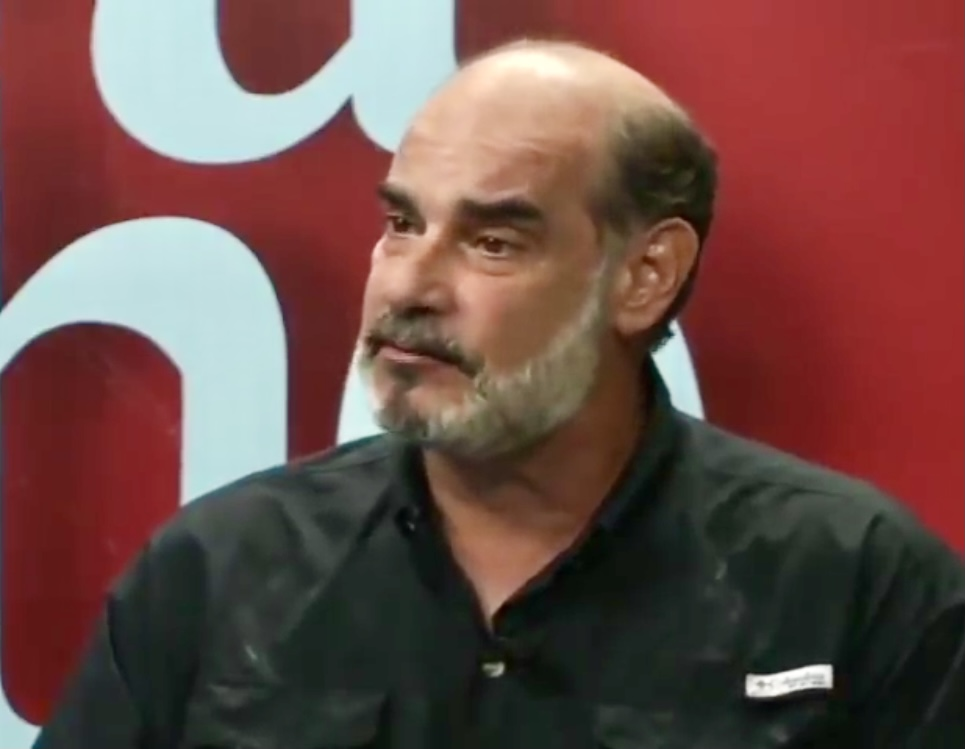
Michael Healy
2020–present
