= José Pallais =

Nicaraguan lawyer and government official (born c. 1954)

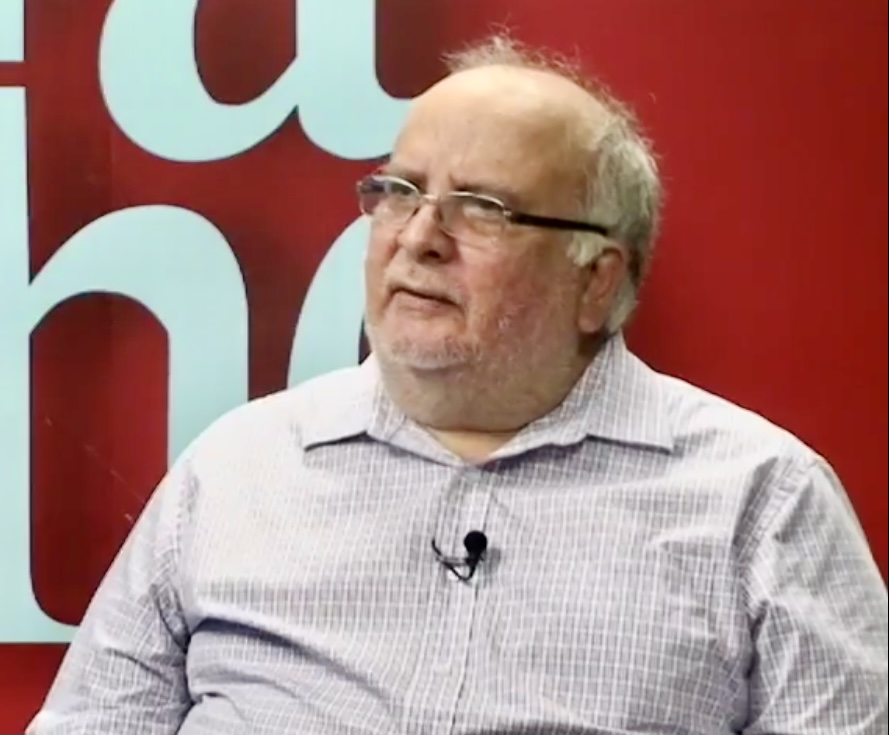
- Pallais in 2017

Vice-minister of Government and Foreign Affairs
- In office 1990–1997
- President: Violeta Barrios de Chamorro

Deputy
- In office 2007–2012

Personal details
- Born: José Bernard Pallais Arana
- Citizenship: Nicaragua
- Party: Liberal Constitutionalist Party
- Education: National Autonomous University of Nicaragua at León; Complutense University
- Occupation: Jurist; Politician

José Bernard Pallais Arana (born c. 1954) is a Nicaraguan jurist and government official. He is a former Deputy Minister of Government and Foreign Affairs of Nicaragua during the administration of Violeta Barrios de Chamorro (1990 to 1997). From 2007 to 2012 he was a Deputy in the National Assembly, representing the León department as a member of the Constitutionalist Liberal Party (PLC).

== Early life ==
José Pallais attended the National Autonomous University of Nicaragua at León, studying law. He earned a PhD from the Complutense University in Madrid and pursued postgraduate work at the Center for Economic Studies, also in Madrid. His work specializes in mercantile and property law.

== Career ==
From 1990 to 1987, Pallais was Vice-Minister of the Government and Foreign Affairs of Nicaragua, under President Violeta Barrios de Chamorro. From 2007 to 2012 he was a deputy in the National Assembly of Nicaragua, representing the León Department with the Constitutional Liberal Party (PLC). In that capacity he was the Assembly president of the Commission of Justice, leading the passage of legislation like the Law Against Organized Crime and the Freedom Information Laws. He has also served as executive secretary of the permanent commission of human rights and the Nicaraguan vice-president of the UN Human Rights Committee in Geneva.

In June 2020, Pallais resigned from the Civic Alliance for Justice and Democracy (ACJD) because of the group's hesitation in signing onto the Statutes of the National Coalition, which he helped draft. He is one of the leaders of the National Coalition, a coalition of opposition groups that developed in the wake of April 2018 protests and ensuing bloody repression by the government. He has urged unity on the part of the opposition, saying, "I lived through the experience of the division in 2006. We cannot allow that mistake, it is a betrayal of the struggle of the Nicaraguan people, allowing or contributing to our being divided again."

In June 2021, Pallais was part of a wave of arrests of opposition pre-candidates for president in the 2021 Nicaraguan general election as well as other opposition and civic leaders. During the arrest police photographed Pallais with police chief Fidel Dominguez, whom the United States has sanctioned for human rights abuses. Pallais was detained for alleged violations of the controversial Law 1055, "Law for the Defense of the Rights of the People to Independence, Sovereignty and Self-Determination for Peace", passed in December 2020. Called the "Guillotine Law" by critics, it gives the government broad power to accuse citizens of working for foreign powers without producing evidence for the claim. The details of Pallais's alleged offenses were not released. The Public Ministry announced he had been sentenced to 90 days of preventive detention while he was investigated.

The National Coalition has denounced his detention, saying his life is at risk due to serious health problems, including diabetes, hypertension, obesity, sleep apnea, glaucoma and spinal problems.

== See also ==
- Carlos Tünnerman
- José Adán Aguerri
- Arturo Cruz Jr.
