= José Adán Aguerri =

Nicaraguan economist

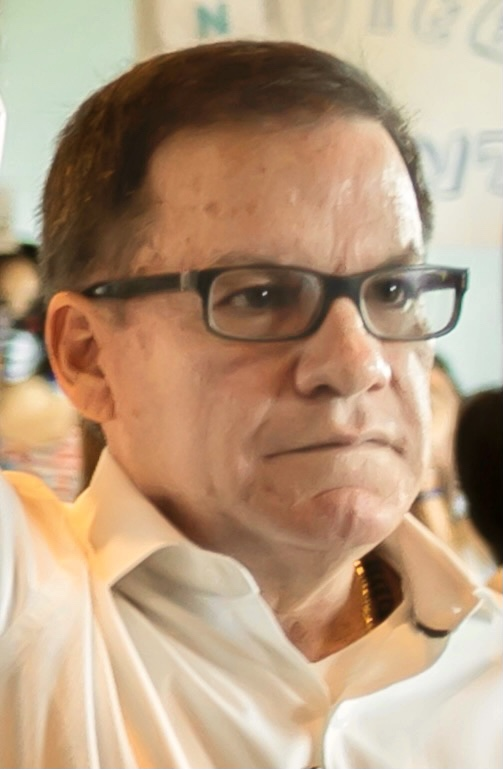
- Aguerri in February 2020

President of the Superior Council for Private Enterprise
- In office 2007–2020
- Succeeded by: Michael Healy

President of Consultative Committee for Economic Integration
- Incumbent
- Assumed office 2010

Personal details
- Born: José Adán Aguerri Chamorro; 1961 or 1962 (age 64–65)
- Citizenship: Nicaragua
- Children: 3
- Education: Louisiana State University
- Profession: Economist

José Adán Aguerri Chamorro (born 1961 or 1962), nicknamed Chanito, is a Nicaraguan economist and civic leader. He is the former president of Nicaraguan business chamber, the Superior Council for Private Enterprise (COSEP), where he worked closely with Nicaraguan President Daniel Ortega as a strong proponent of the "consensus model" that gave the business community a large degree of influence over economic policy in exchange for supporting Ortega. However, the consensus broke down over social security reforms and human rights abuses in April 2018 and Aguerri became a vocal critic of Ortega. Aguerri was arrested in June 2021 along with a number of other opposition leaders including six opposition pre-candidates seeking to challenge Ortega's reelection bid in the 2021 Nicaraguan general election.

== Early life and family ==
Born 1961 or 1962, José Adán Aguerri Chamorro is the son of Hilda Chamorro and José Adán "Chanito" Aguerri Hurtado. The elder Chanito, with his father, opened the Aguerri Theater, Nicaragua's first movie theater and from there built a successful business operating movie theaters in Nicaragua. Prior to the Sandinistas coming to power, the family owned 20 theaters and was close to the Somoza regime by way of ties to Hope Portocarrero, wife of Anastasio Somoza Debayle. By contrast Aguerri's maternal grandfather Humberto Chamorro was an opponent of Anastasio Somoza García; Chamorro was imprisoned and beaten almost to death for his involvement in the April 1954 uprising.

Aguerri graduated from Colegio Centro América the beginning of the insurrection in late 1978. Then part of the student opposition, Aguerri's family went into exile for their safety, first living in England and later in the United States and Mexico. In the US, Aguerri studied economics at Louisiana State University.

== Career ==
Aguerri is an economist by profession. He worked at Banco Uno for a time and then in 2005 was introduced to the Chamber of Commerce by his high school classmate Sucre Frech Zablah (son of the famous sports announcer). Aguerri became immediately successful: within nine months he was president of the chamber and vice-president of the Superior Council for Private Enterprise (COSEP), the leading Nicaraguan association representing the interests of the business sector. In the span of that time he was re-elected to the position 11 times. From 2007 to 2020, Aguerri was president of COSEP. Unlike other COSEP members who worked at their own companies, COSEP was his full-time job. Aguerri says he is a member of other companies but declines to name them, saying he wants to avoid becoming a target of pressure. From 2010 to the present, he has also been president of the Consultative Committee for Economic Integration (CCIE), a regional consortium of Central American businesspeople, organized into 17 federations, 95 chambers and associations, and representing more than 50,000 businesspeople.

For most of Aguerri's time as president of COSEP, he was an advocate for the "Model of Consensus and Dialogue" through which President Daniel Ortega governed with the support of the business sector by granting them privileged status and input on law-making. Members of the business sector enjoyed positions in public-private partnerships, government ministries, government agencies, and investment commissions: Aguerri for example was on the board of directors of the Central Bank, the Airport Administration Company, and the Superintendency of Banks and Other Financial Institutions. However the consensus model broke down on 16 April 2018 when the government announced a unilateral overhaul of social security and its associated tax structure; business sector representatives withdrew in protest for the failure to consult them. Two days later, a small popular protest against the imposition of the pension austerity aspect of the reforms was met by severe repression, unleashing mass protests in defense of the rights of the original protestors, and then a still-more bloody government crackdown, with more than 300 killed. Aguerri became a vocal critic of Ortega. On 16 May 2018, he joined the Civic Alliance for Justice and Democracy as well as the National Dialogue in the opposition camp. He called for Ortega to step down and commented that the business community shared some responsibility for the crisis, having focused on their economic priorities while ignoring issues around democracy and civic institutions.

On 7 September 2019, FSLN shot at his car as he left León, where he traveled as a member of the Civic Alliance to escort a radio owner who had been subject to confiscation. On 8 June 2021, Aguerri was part of a wave of arrests by the Ortega government, including four opposition pre-candidates for president in the 2021 Nicaraguan general election, their associates and other opposition figures. Like most of those arrested, Aguerri was detained on alleged violations of controversial Law 1055, alleged "acts that undermine the independence, sovereignty and self-determination of peoples and incite foreign interference." Passed by the FSLN-controlled legislature in December 2020, Law 1055 gives the government broad power to arrest anyone it designates a "traitor to the homeland." The detention of Aguerri and others drew international outcry, with former Costa Rican President Laura Chinchilla calling it a "tropical version of the Night of the Long Knives" and the 50,000 businesspeople associated with CCIE demanding Aguerri's release.

As with the others arrested, Aguerri was sentenced to 90 days of preventive detention. On 24 June 2021, the Inter-American Court of Human Rights (IACHR) issued a ruling finding him in an "extremely grave situation. As such, there exists an urgent necessity to adopt measures that avoid irreparable harm to the rights of life and physical integrity" and therefore ordered his release, as well as the release of fellow opposition leaders Violeta Granera, Juan Sebastián Chamorro, and Félix Maradiaga. The Court cited lack of information regarding their whereabouts, as well as health concerns and concerns about the conditions under which they are being held. The Nicaraguan government has not complied.

== Personal life ==
Aguerri has been married twice and is raising three children with his second wife.

== See also ==
- Arturo Cruz Jr.
- Cristiana Chamorro Barrios
