= San Miguelito, Nicaragua =

San Miguelito
- Municipality
- Location in Nicaragua
- Coordinates: 11°24′N 84°54′W
- Country: Nicaragua
- Department: Río San Juan

Area
  - Municipality: 424 sq mi (1,097 km^{2})

Population (2005)
  - Municipality: 17,031
  - Density: 40.21/sq mi (15.53/km^{2})
  - Urban: 2,807

San Miguelito is a municipality in the Río San Juan department of Nicaragua. It occupied an area of 1,097 km^{2} (424 sq mi), and as per 2023 estimate, the municipality has a population of 17,031 individuals. The settlement was founded in the mid 19th century by rubber tappers and Ipecacuanha gatherers, and was a major commercial center in the 20th century.

== History ==
The first settlement in the area, to the east of the current location, was known as "Las Aldeas" ("Villages") and was founded between the years 1850 and 1855 by rubber tappers and Ipecacuanha gatherers (raicilleros). In the 20th century, San Miguelito became a major commercial center due to its rubber and raicilla based industries. A railway line was built to transport the produce to the port city of Punta Mico on the Atlantic coast.

== Geography ==
San Miguelito is a municipality in the Río San Juan Department of southeastern Nicaragua. It occupies an area of 1,097 km^{2} (424 sq mi). It shares boundaries with the municipalities of Acoyapa, Villa Sandino, and El Coral to the north, Nueva Guinea to the east, Morrito to the west, and San Miguelito and Nueva Guinea to the south. It is situated on the eastern shore of Lake Nicaragua, about 250 km (160 mi) from the national capital of Managua.

== Demographics and economy ==
As per 2023 estimate, the municipality has a population of 19,543 individuals of whom 10,013 were males and 9,530 were females. The rural population was 15,254 (78.1%) and the rest of the population of 4,289 (21.9%) was classified as urban.

While it was a major center of rubber production earlier, the major economic activity now is agriculture and livestock rearing. The municipality is called "The white water pool", due to its dairy industry.

== International relations ==
San Miguelito is twinned with Waltrop in Germany.
