= Kukra Hill =

City in Mosquitia

- Municipality
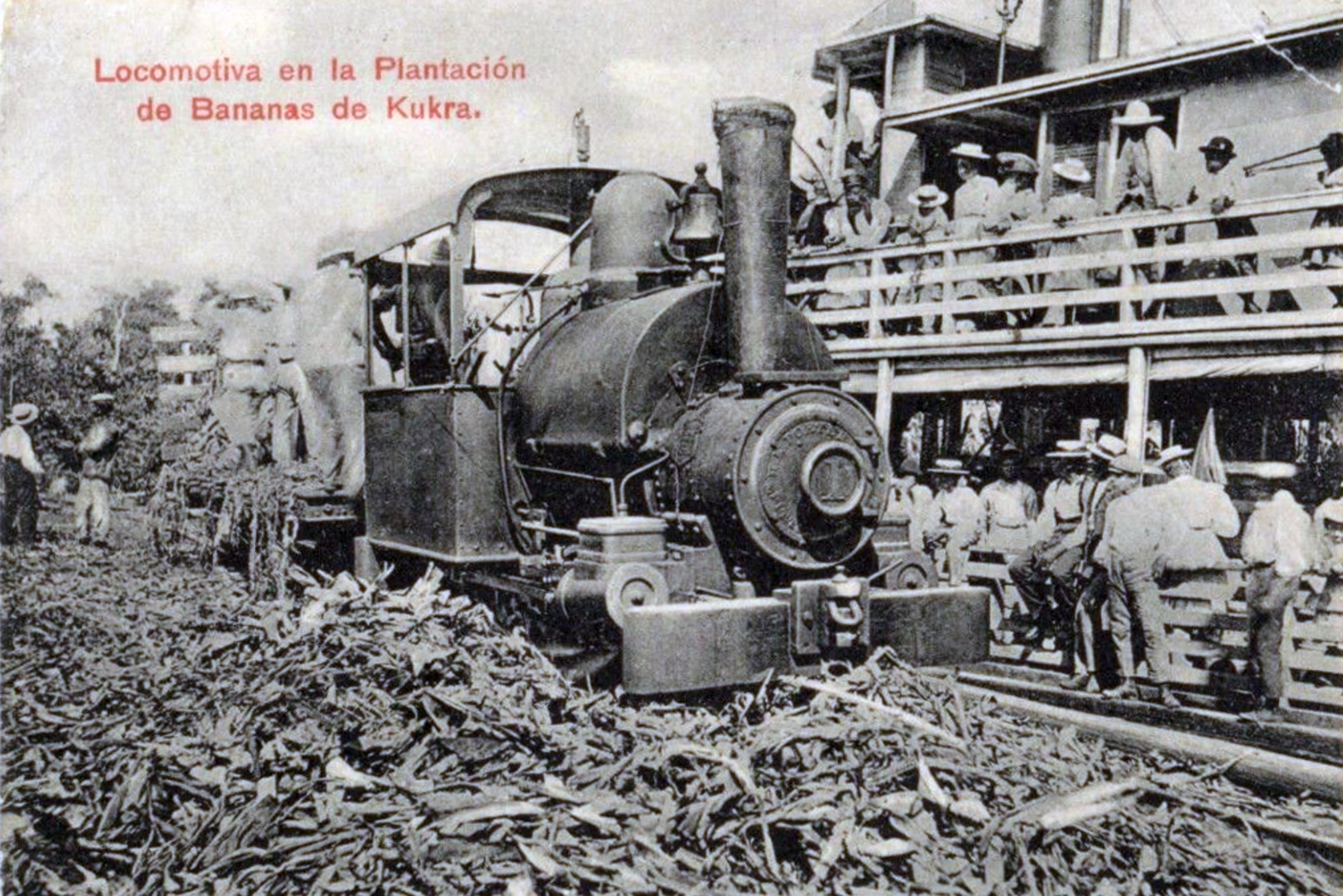
- Interactive map of Kukra Hill
- Coordinates: 12°15′N 83°45′W
- Country: Nicaragua
- Department: South Caribbean Coast Autonomous Region

Area
  - Municipality: 460.71 sq mi (1,193.23 km^{2})

Population (2023 estimate)
  - Municipality: 10,216
  - Density: 22.175/sq mi (8.5616/km^{2})
  - Urban: 4,462
- Climate: Af

Kukra Hill is a municipality and city in the South Caribbean Coast Autonomous Region in the Republic of Nicaragua. It was granted municipal status in 1989; before then, it was administratively part of the municipality of Bluefields, in the former department of Zelaya.

== Pronunciation ==
The word "Kukra" is pronounced "Kukara" by the locals.

== Geography ==
The municipal boundaries are north to the municipalities of El Tortuguero and Laguna de Perlas, south to the municipality of Bluefields, east to the Caribbean Sea, and west to the municipality of El Rama. The municipal seat is located 415 kilometers from the capital city of Managua. The voluminous Escondido River serves as a boundary line between Kukra Hill and Bluefields for part of its course.

== History ==
Originally, the territory of Kukra Hill was inhabited by the Kukra ethnic group, part of the Ulua group. This ethnicity began to mix with African natives brought as slaves to America in the second half of the 17th century; their dominance was later disrupted by the expansion of the Miskito ethnicity, who, allied with English pirates, subdued them. From then until 1796, when England had to recognize Spain's sovereignty over Mosquitia, the English presence was constant.

In 1821, when Central America gained independence from Spain, England intervened again on the Nicaraguan Caribbean coast by proclaiming the Kingdom of Mosquitia as a British protectorate, integrating the territory of Kukra Hill into it.

The Kukras were absorbed by the dominant Miskitos by the end of the 18th century, and the territory began to be repopulated in the early 19th century when the government of Nicaragua dismantled local governments and began to exert sovereignty over the Caribbean Coast territory, granting the municipality to American concessionaires for the exploitation of rubber, precious woods, bananas, prickly pear, cocoa, and livestock.

Only the names of some places such as Kukra Hill, Kukra River, and Kukra Point remain from the Kukras.

The current population of Nicaragua's Caribbean coast is made up of descendants from a wide variety of groups, including African blacks, Chinese, and Europeans. The municipality was formed in 1989 by a split from the city of Bluefields.

== Demographics ==
Kukra Hill has a current population of 10,159 inhabitants. Of the total population, 50.8% are men and 49.2% are women. Nearly 43.1% of the population lives in the urban area.

== Nature and Climate ==
This area is characterized by a humid tropical climate, where precipitation is high, reaching up to 5000 mm per year, typically between 2000 and 3000 mm annually.

The soils of Kukra Hill are among the most fertile in the South Caribbean Coast Autonomous Region; they are of moderately heavy texture, with a high percentage of fine elements, clay, and silt. Most of the municipality's territory is an extensive, gently undulating plain located at 50 meters above sea level. The highest point is Kukra Hill, which rises to 192 meters.

Most of the primary forest that originally covered the territory has disappeared due to deforestation for timber extraction, the establishment of crops, or pastures. Currently, some of the area is occupied by mangrove forests along the coastal zone and dark wood forests (mahogany, laurel, cedar, etc.) in the western part of the territory; the deforested areas are covered by pastures without livestock, large plots of sugarcane and oil palm, which is the main source of employment in the south Atlantic region, hosted by a national company of the same group AGROSA, owned by Nicaraguan businessmen. This company, CUKRA DEVELOPMENT CORPORATION S.A., is a socially responsible enterprise which has social development and environmental protection projects. This company tries to maintain a friendly relationship with the environment and the community, being the main engine of development for the region and the municipality.

== Economy ==
The municipality is endowed with very good land and water, so the main economic activity is livestock, accompanied by agriculture.

== Culture ==
Spanish is the most used language of the municipality, given the predominance of mestizos from the interior of the country. Miskito and Creole are also used by the populations of those ethnicities.

The main festival commemorated in the municipality is that of Saint John Baptist de La Salle, a Catholic saint.

The Palo de Mayo, the most prominent traditional celebration of the Creole ethnicity, is the result of the convergence of various cultures.

== Transport ==
Transportation to and from Bluefields is by boat via the Cukra River and Bluefields Bay. There is a concrete road to El Rama and Laguna de Perlas.

== See also ==
- Municipalities of Nicaragua
