= Muelle de los Bueyes =

Muelle de los Bueyes Bullocks Wharf (Creole)
- Municipality
- Location in Nicaragua
- Coordinates: 12°04′N 84°32′W
- Country: Nicaragua
- Department: South Caribbean Coast Autonomous Region

Area
  - Municipality: 532.73 sq mi (1,379.77 km^{2})

Population (2023 estimate)
  - Municipality: 24,616
  - Density: 46.207/sq mi (17.841/km^{2})
  - Urban: 11,291
- Climate: Am

Muelle de los Bueyes is a town and a municipality in the South Caribbean Coast Autonomous Region of Nicaragua.

== Geography ==
The municipal area borders the municipality of El Rama to the north and east, El Coral and Nueva Guinea to the south, and Villa Sandino and Santo Tomás to the west. The municipal seat is located 250 kilometers from the capital, Managua.

== History ==
Until the early decades of the 20th century, the municipal territory was part of the dense, uninhabited jungle that divided Nicaragua in two. The demand for rubber and hule by American companies in the 1930s integrated it into the Caribbean coast's economy as a supplier of these products, which were transported via the Mico-Escondido River route to Bluefields. Its current municipal seat, then called San Pablo, was a transfer point for these goods, as they would be transferred from ox carts onto river boats in this area. The concentration of draft animals there gave it its current name. The demand for labor from these operations made the settlement of the municipality possible.

The municipality was founded in 1942 following a separation from El Rama.

A second major migratory wave, the most intense, occurred from the 1950s to after 1974, linked to the second and third stages of the country's integration into the global market, with cotton and meat as the main agro-export products.

== Demographics ==
Muelle de los Bueyes currently has a population of 24,552 inhabitants, with 49.6% men and 50.4% women. Nearly 45.3% of the population lives in urban areas.

Gender (2022)

- Men: 12,167 (49.6%)
- Women: 12,385 (50.4%)

More information about the population structure:

Urbanization (2022)

- Rural: 13,429 (54.7%)
- Urban: 11,123 (45.3%)

== Nature and Climate ==
The municipality has a tropical climate that produces very moist subtropical and tropical moist forests, with an average annual temperature of 26°C. From December to February, temperatures are cooler, ranging from 17°C to 25°C due to cold fronts from the north of the continent. From March to August, it is warmer with temperatures reaching up to 33°C; it is a regularly rainy area for about 9 months of the year, and annual rainfall ranges from 2700 to 2900 mm.

== Localities ==
There are a total of 8 populated centers and possibly about 54 comarcas, with the following as the populated centers: Muelle de los Bueyes (urban center and head of the municipality), Presillas (the second largest urban center after the main municipal seat), Cara de Mono, El Cacao, La Batea, El Espavel, La Gorra, and Campana.

== Economy ==
The municipality has very good land and water resources, making livestock the main economic activity, alongside agriculture. Its most recognized business in the livestock sector is the dairy processor Castilac, commonly known as El Guanaco, which belongs to the Miranda family.

== See also ==
- Municipalities of Nicaragua
