= El Tortuguero =

- Municipality
- Location in Nicaragua
- Coordinates: 12°49′N 84°12′W
- Country: Nicaragua
- Department: South Caribbean Coast Autonomous Region

Area
  - Municipality: 1,313.93 sq mi (3,403.07 km^{2})

Population (2023 estimate)
  - Municipality: 61,007
  - Density: 46.431/sq mi (17.927/km^{2})
  - Urban: 11,601
- Climate: Am

El Tortuguero (Spanish pronunciation: [el toɾˈtuɣeɾo]) is a municipality in the South Caribbean Coast Autonomous Region of Nicaragua. It is located at about 530 km from Managua and can only be reached by an hour-long truck ride from El Rama.

== History ==
The first inhabitants were of the Ulua ethnicity. Unlike other municipalities, there was no direct presence of American timber enclaves, but their presence was felt through contractors who arrived around 1945 to exploit the timber.

El Tortuguero is one of the country's younger municipalities. It was formed in 1996 by a split from the municipality of La Cruz de Río Grande. The departure of companies due to the disaster caused by Hurricane Irene led the population to seek its own survival, primarily dedicating itself to subsistence agriculture and livestock. Over the years, peasants from the interior of the country have been arriving in search of land, a trend that continues today.

== Geography ==
The municipality of El Tortuguero is located in the northern area of the South Caribbean Coast Autonomous Region, between the coordinates 12° 49' 0" North latitude and 84° 12' 0" West longitude. It was founded on May 27, 1996, by Law No. 221, and its territory covers 3,403 km². Before its foundation, the territory belonged to the municipality of La Cruz de Río Grande. It is situated in the north-central part of the region, 203 kilometers northwest of the city of Bluefields by waterway, passing through the municipality of Laguna de Perlas, navigating the Kurinwas and Kukarawala rivers. The distance to Managua, the capital, is 530 kilometers.

=== Boundaries ===
The municipal term is bordered to the north by the municipality of La Cruz de Río Grande, to the south by the municipalities of El Rama and Bluefields, to the east by the municipalities of Desembocadura de Río Grande and Laguna de Perlas, and to the west by the municipalities of Paiwas and El Ayote.

== Demographics ==
El Tortuguero currently has a population of 58,463 inhabitants. Of the total population, 51.7% are men and 48.3% are women. Nearly 18.4% of the population lives in the urban area.

== Localities ==
The municipality of El Tortuguero consists of 5 microregions, which in turn are made up of 49 urban and rural communities. The population is dispersed across these communities and neighborhoods.

== Economy ==
The main economic activities are livestock and agriculture. There is also informal trade.

== Ecology ==
Within this municipality as well as others, there is a growing reduction in ecological activity. It lacks an emergency restoration plan that should be promoted by the relevant entities such as INAFOR, MARENA, MAGFOR, the mayor's office, local leaders, police, and army. This situation should be addressed with great concern by the corresponding institutions and develop among the settled population an awareness to establish agroecological production practices for forest recovery. This tool should include defining a buffer zone to act as a protective ring to prevent the insertion of new settlers and the deterioration of such an important reserve.

== Culture ==
In the municipality, the common language is Spanish, and occasionally Miskito can also be heard.

== See also ==
- Municipalities of Nicaragua
