= El Ayote =

- Municipality

- Location in Nicaragua
- Coordinates: 12°30′N 84°49′W
- Country: Nicaragua
- Department: South Caribbean Coast Autonomous Region

Area
  - Land: 320.85 sq mi (831.00 km^{2})

Population (2023 estimate)
  - Municipality: 20,508
  - Density: 63.918/sq mi (24.679/km^{2})
  - Urban: 8,840
- Climate: Am

El Ayote is a municipality in the South Caribbean Coast Autonomous Region of Nicaragua. The population is 5,406.

== Geography ==
El Ayote is located at a distance of 162 kilometers from the capital, Managua. To the north it borders the municipality of Paiwas, to the south with the municipality of Rama, to the east with the municipalities of El Tortuguero and El Rama, and to the west with the municipalities of Santo Domingo, La Libertad, and Camoapa.

== History ==
El Ayote is one of Nicaragua's youngest municipalities. It was officially founded in April 2000. Until then, it was part of the municipality of El Rama, which, due to communication difficulties due to distance, poor communication routes, and the absence of proper means of transport, functioned as a delegation of the mayoralty.

In the unofficial history, orally told by the town's first settlers, the municipality was born as a settlement of a group of people from 25 families, who lived in the La Piñuela area. Among these families were the Zeledón family, Sotelo family, Arróliga family, Méndez family, Leiva family, Gaitán family, among others. Before it was populated, it was a mountain port with a military base of the Army, commanded by Major Francisco Javier Hidalgo, who was in charge of moving the families that were in La Piñuela to El Ayote because they were threatened by the irregular army of the Contras during the Contra War. As the town grew, on weekends, people from the regions would come in large numbers to buy the necessary products that traders brought from different cities of the country.

In 1990, it was selected as the IV Enclave for the demobilization of the irregular forces that were fighting in this area. The population grew rapidly as many demobilized soldiers decided to stay in the territory, received land in the Development Policy that was created or simply took a piece of mountain, and made a farm and family.

== Demographics ==
El Ayote has a current population of 20,013 inhabitants. Of the total population, 50.3% are men and 49.7% are women. Almost 42.7% of the population lives in the urban area.

== Nature and Climate ==
The rainy season is hot, oppressive, and cloudy, and the dry season is very hot, muggy, windy, and partly cloudy. Over the course of the year, the temperature generally varies from 18 to 32 °C and rarely falls below 16 °C or rises above 34 °C. The municipality's topography is formed by natural accidents that are part of the central mountainous shield formed by vulcanism, which has the Amerrisque mountain range as its main feature. The average annual precipitation ranges between 2000 and 2450 mm, dry enough for livestock activity, although the municipality is surrounded by tropical humid forest.

== Localities ==
It is subdivided into the urban center and 23 rural communities: Las Parras, Jobo, La Cusuca, Jobito, Santa Isabel, Banco de Siquia, La Danta, La Piñuela, Las Cañas, Nawawas, El Bambú, Nawawasito, Lajerito, Kurinwasito, La Chancha, Cerro Grande, Nueva Luz, Calderón, Nueva Unión, El Cacao, El Guayabo, and Pilán.

== Economy ==
Cattle farming is the main productive and economic activity of the municipality, although pig farming is also important; agriculture is practiced on a small scale with bean cultivation on alluvial soils and with poor productive results. It is very orthodox, with cattle raised extensively and agricultural production carried out with little to no fertilization. Since the 1990s, commerce has flourished in the municipal capital, which, due to its accessible location, serves as a meeting point for intermediaries and producers from the municipality and neighboring municipalities. From El Ayote, agro-livestock products are transported by paved road to national markets, and producers take advantage of these departures to purchase products such as footwear, clothing, medicines, veterinary goods, and other industrial products.

== Culture ==
One of the few local traditions is the annual celebration of Saint Joseph on March 19.

== See also ==
- Municipalities of Nicaragua
