= El Coral =

- Municipality
- Location in Nicaragua
- Coordinates: 11°54′57″N 84°39′1″W
- Country: Nicaragua
- Department: Chontales Department

Government
  - Mayor: Fermin Cuadra

Area
  - Land: 118 sq mi (306 km^{2})

Population (2023 estimate)
  - Total: 8,427
  - Density: 71.3/sq mi (27.5/km^{2})

El Coral is a municipality in the southeastern portion of Chontales Department of Nicaragua. It occupies an area of 306 km^{2} (118 sq mi), and as per 2023 estimate, the municipality has a population of 8,427 individuals.

== History ==
The name "El Coral" originates from "La Quebrada del Coral", a stream in the region that was named after the coral snake by the early settlers in the region. Till the middle of the 19th century, the population was dominated by indigenous people. Later, outside settlers came to the region to set up cattle ranches, and timber yards. In the mid 20th century, further migration increased the population.

El Coral was officially established as a municipality on 20 February 1997.

== Geography ==
El Coral is a municipality in the Chontales Department of Nicaragua. It occupies an area of 306 km^{2} (118 sq mi). It is located in the southeastern part of the department. The municipality is bordered by the municipalities of Nueva Guinea and El Almendro to the south, Villa Sandino and Muelle de los Bueyes to the north, Muelle de los Bueyes and Nueva Guinea to the east, and Acoyapa and Villa Sandino to the west. It is located 239 km (149 mi) from the Nicaraguan capital of Managua.

The topography is predominantly flat, with a few small peaks along the northern border. The highest peak is the Cerro Las Paces at 545 m (1,788 ft). There are several rivers flowing through the municipality, the major of which is the El Rama River. The vegetation consists of tropical rainforests with a high precipitation throughout the year.

== Demographics and economy ==
As per 2023 estimate, El Coral has a population of 8,427 individuals of whom 4,176 males and 4,251 females. The urban population was 4,554 (54%) and the rest of the population (46%) was classified as living in rural areas.

The economy of the municipality is mainly based on livestock rearing and associated industries. There is limited agriculture, and the major agricultural produce include maize, beans, cassava, and sugarcane. The soil is poor, and due to the dense vegetation, agroforestry systems are common, especially banana and coffee plantations. The municipality's climate supports year round grazing and attracts ranchers from other parts of the department during the dry season.
