= Paiwas =

- Municipality
- Location in Nicaragua
- Coordinates: 12°47′10″N 85°07′23″W
- Country: Nicaragua
- Region: South Caribbean Coast Autonomous Region

Government
  - Type: Mayor

Area
  - Municipality: 806.41 sq mi (2,088.60 km^{2})

Population (2023 Estimate)
  - Municipality: 36,628
  - Urban: 8,837
- Climate: Am

Paiwas is a municipality in the South Caribbean Coast Autonomous Region of Nicaragua. The administrative center is the town of Bocana de Paiwas.

== Toponymy ==
The name Paiwas in the Chontal language means "Two Rivers," from the words pais (two) and was (river). However, recent studies have argued that this meaning does not correspond to reality, suggesting a more accurate meaning in the Sumo language (a subdivision of Ulua): Pai (sweet potatoes) and was (river), translating to "River of Sweet Potatoes." This interpretation is considered more plausible due to the geographic location of the area.

== Geography ==
The municipal territory is bordered to the north by the municipality of Mulukukú, to the south by El Ayote, to the east by La Cruz de Río Grande and El Tortuguero, and to the west by Matiguás, Río Blanco, and Camoapa. The administrative center is located 227 kilometers from the capital, Managua. It is still unclear whether it belongs to Matagalpa or the Atlantic Coast, as there remains a dilemma about its jurisdiction. Interestingly, its central location is estimated to be in the middle of Nicaragua.

== History ==
The history of Paiwas is not well-known, with most information centered around archaeological sites, petroglyphs, and crafts found as offerings in the burials of the area's early inhabitants. To date, more than a hundred archaeological sites have been identified.

Bocana de Paiwas has been the municipal seat since March 15, 1974, established by legislative decree 343, published in La Gaceta No. 79 on April 3, 1974, and continues as such according to Article 6 of the current Political and Administrative Division Law, approved on October 21, 2004, and published in La Gaceta No. 24 on February 3, 2005.

== Demographics ==
Paiwas has a current population of 36,533 inhabitants. Of the total population, 49.9% are men and 50.1% are women. Almost 23.4% of the population lives in the urban area.

== Nature and Climate ==
The municipality experiences a tropical monsoon climate, with average temperatures between 24 and 25 °C and annual rainfall ranging from 2400 mm to 3000 mm, well-distributed throughout the year. The region serves as a transition zone between the central mountain chain of Nicaragua and the coastal plains. Its highest point is Cerro Ubú (549 meters), surrounded by rivers, with the Grande River of Matagalpa running through the center. The area is characterized by subtropical moist forest vegetation with extensive broadleaf forests.

== Localities ==
The administrative center is currently being moved from Bocana de Paiwas to Ubú Norte. In 1998, the municipality consisted of 31 communities, according to the Municipal Development Indicative Plan.

== Economy ==
Since 1990, extensive livestock farming has been revitalized in Paiwas, including cattle fattening, milk production, and breeding. The municipality is part of the agricultural frontier, where small-scale farmers initially settle and cultivate the land, which is later used for extensive cattle grazing, gradually transforming the Atlantic Coast into pastures and displacing tropical rainforests.

== Political Dispute with Ubú Norte ==
Since 1998, following a municipal ordinance and under the pretext of constructing the Copalar dam, the municipal authorities decided to move the town hall and some municipal offices to Ubú Norte. This decision, deemed illegitimate, violates the ancestral rights of the residents of Bocana de Paiwas. The conflict, ongoing since 1993, highlights significant inequity in municipal investment, with over 80% of the budget allocated to Ubú Norte and surrounding communities, neglecting Bocana de Paiwas and San Pedro del Norte. This situation has fueled support among residents for splitting the municipality, with San Pedro del Norte seeking its own administration after years of neglect.

== See also ==
- Municipalities of Nicaragua
