= Nueva Guinea =

- Municipality
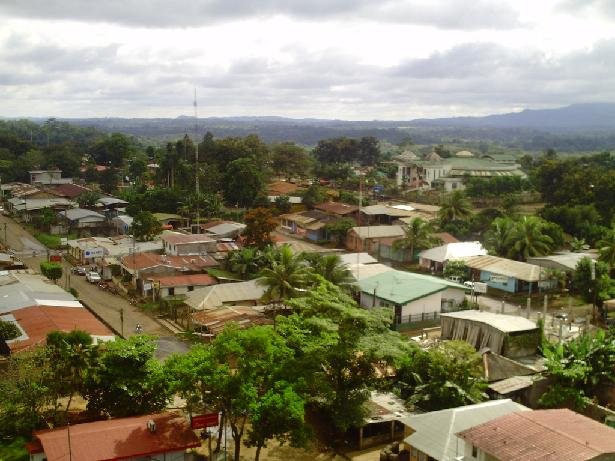
- Nueva Guinea in May 2011

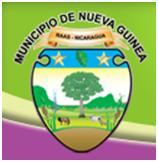
- Seal
- Interactive map of Nueva Guinea
- Coordinates: 11°41′N 84°27′W
- Country: Nicaragua
- Autonomous Region: South Caribbean Coast Autonomous Region
- Municipality: Nueva Guinea

Area
  - Municipality: 2,677.46 km^{2} (1,033.77 sq mi)
- Elevation: 184 m (604 ft)

Population (2023 estimate)
  - Municipality: 79,818
  - Density: 29.811/km^{2} (77.210/sq mi)
  - Urban: 40,913
- Time zone: UTCGMT-6
- Climate: Am
- Website: Nueva Guinea

Nueva Guinea (Spanish pronunciation: [ˈnweβa ɣiˈnea]) is a town and a municipality in the South Caribbean Coast Autonomous Region of Nicaragua.

Nueva Guinea was founded in the 1960s and saw significant growth in the early 1970s as the US Peace Corps helped to move families from the Pacific region of Nicaragua to Nueva Guinea in exchange for free land and agricultural help.

20 km east of Leon Nicaragua, Cerro Negro erupted on 3 February 1971, causing extensive ash fall to the west. Up to 10 cm of ash were deposited in villages near the volcano. The eruption ended on 14 February. Much farmland was damaged by the ash fall from the eruption. USAID and/or perhaps U.S. Peace Corps, in conjunction with the Government of Nicaragua, provided aid consisting of elements of the U.S. Air Force 24th Special Operations Squadron, Howard Air Force Base, Canal Zone (Panama). In an effort encompassing approximately 3 weeks in early 1971, U.S.A.F. C123K aircraft conducted numerous sorties between Leon Nicaragua and Nueva Guinea relocating an estimated 1000 families along with their livestock and pets to Nueva Guinea. Helping to coordinate the weeks-long relief effort were 2 U.S.A.F. combat controllers on site throughout at Nueva Guinea. The two controllers provided radio communications, set up and maintained a non directional beacon navigation aid, provided weather observations and updated airfield status reports helping to ensure safe air operations.

Skilled pilots landed the high-wing C123s on the unimproved runway surface at Nueva Guinea onto a sod runway surface not much wider than the fuselage and landing gear of the large aircraft. The high wings extended over meter high berms along each side of the runway. Part way into the mission, a bulldozer was airlanded by the C123K aircraft. The bulldozer was used to extend the runway and over-run area and some levelling of the berms along the runway length was accomplished. This was done in order to increase runway safety.

During the mission, local children ranging in age from approximately two to 14 years regularly gathered near the runway to observe the air traffic controllers.

The disaster response relocation of Nicaraguan citizens was of a magnitude (estimated 1000 families) that was at the time quite significant to the Nueva Guinea community. It is believed at that time (1971) that Nueva Guinea lacked all-weather road connections. The road connecting to populated regions of Nicaragua was only believed passable during the dry season. In 1971 there was a medium size electric generator in the town that operated for several hours nightly, powering some street lights and perhaps a few basic shops and homes. Refrigeration was accomplished with "ice boxes" and ice, packed in burlap bags with sawdust for insulation was flown in regularly. It is believed that two local bakers alternated bread making duties for the townspeople and fresh beef or pork was available- usually one or the other- depending upon the butchering schedule. As chickens seemed numerous, eggs were readily available at the small restaurant in town. At the time of the air mission, in addition to the two USAF personnel in town there was one U.S. citizen known to reside longer-term in Nueva Guinea, that being a Catholic aid worker from Sheboygan, Wisconsin USA. (Written by a USAF combat controller who lived at Nueva Guinea throughout the relief mission in 1971.)

== Geography ==
The municipality shares borders to the north with the municipalities of Muelle de los Bueyes and El Rama; to the south with San Carlos, El Castillo and Bluefields; to the east with El Rama and Bluefields; and to the west with those of El Almendro, Villa Sandino and San Miguelito.

The county seat is located 292 km from the city of Managua.

The town is divided about halfway through the mountains of the Cordillera de Yolaina.

== Nature and climate ==
Nueva Guinea has a tropical monsoon climate (Köppen: Am). The average annual rainfall is 2,245 millimetres or 90 inches.

The territory on which sits the town consists of Tertiary basaltic volcanic deposits, and on these rocks primarily an upper layer of red clay with thicknesses ranging between 50 and 60 feet in the subsequent layer is often gravel. All these soils have low fertility rates to media.

== Towns ==
In Nueva Guinea there is a unique system of territorial organization in the country: the administrative unit immediately to the city are the districts in which there are five not including the village and each district comprises a number of colonies ranging from two to twelve and the colonies are in turn subdivided into districts comarcas.3 states do are: Talolinga, Naciones Unidas, La Fonseca, La Union and Nueva Guinea.

== Economy ==
The main economic activity is agriculture, particularly agriculture (quequisque, cassava, taro, bananas, tomatoes, rice, beans, corn, etc.), Since livestock is intended primarily for domestic consumption locally and nationally. The low productivity for agriculture of land won from the jungle a few years after plowing makes the peasants will continue leaving for pasture and forest clearing, which is calculated in a few decades could float away all the forests area.

Now it seems one of the most developed municipalities of Nicaragua, but this development is based on unsustainable agricultural activities and not suitable for the tropical wet forest vocation.

== History ==
The territory has been inhabited since ancient times, in the Punta Gorda River basin remains have been discovered almost destroyed in a pre-Hispanic civilization edified concentric structures, and analysis of pottery collected by Smithsonian researchers date it to about 3000 to 4000 years before the present era.

In the first half of the twentieth century began colonizing the area with the first clearing of jungle, being from 1950 when it began to populate the area for extractive activities such as rubber and wood raicilla

== Universities ==
The area has four universities:

- Agricultural Technical Education Center (CETA/INATEC)
- University of the Autonomous Regions of the Nicaraguan Caribbean Coast (URACCAN)
- University of the Assemblies of God, Martin Luther (UML)
- West University (UDO)

== International relations ==
=== Twin towns – Sister cities ===
Nueva Guinea is twinned with the following cities:

- Sint-Truiden, Belgium

== See also ==
- Municipalities of Nicaragua
