= Municipalities of Nicaragua =

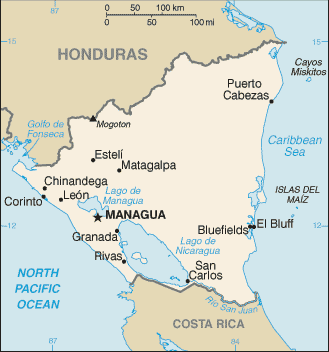
CIA map of Nicaragua

The 15 departments and 2 autonomous regions of Nicaragua are divided into 153 municipalities. The formation and dissolution of municipalities is governed by the Law of Municipalities (in Spanish: Ley No.40 - Ley de Municipalidades), drafted and approved by the National Assembly on July 2. 1988.

The municipalities are responsible for planning and urban development, collection of municipal taxes, maintenance of public utilities and other services, such as parks, sewerage and public cemeteries. Whilst municipal governments may not be responsible for large highways, small roads and tracks usually come under their control. Additionally, municipal governments may issue permits for the operation of urban and intermunicipal bus services.

Other functions of municipal governments include the establishment of libraries, museums, municipal bands, zoos, the promotion of traditional and folklore festivals and various activities promoting education, culture, sports and tourism in the municipality.

== List of municipalities ==
Department	Municipality	Municipality Seat	Population (2005)	Area (km^{2})	Year (Note: The date the municipality was created. In some cases, the year refers to the date of the foundation of the municipality seat, which is particularly the case of colonial cities.)
Boaco	Boaco	Boaco	49,839	1,086.81	—N/a
Boaco	Camoapa	Camoapa	34,962	1,483.29	1858
Boaco	San Lorenzo	San Lorenzo	23,666	559.61	1858
Boaco	San José de los Remates	San José de Los Remates	7,650	280.46	1848
Boaco	Santa Lucía	Santa Lucía	8,254	120.78	1904
Boaco	Teustepe	Teustepe	26,265	645.73	1970
Carazo	Diriamba	Diriamba	57,542	348.88	1894
Carazo	Dolores	Dolores	6,761	2.62	1895
Carazo	El Rosario	El Rosario	5,317	11	1848
Carazo	Jinotepe	Jinotepe	42,109	292	1883
Carazo	La Conquista	La Conquista	3,777	91	1899
Carazo	La Paz de Carazo	La Paz de Carazo	4,657	15.51	1858
Carazo	San Marcos	San Marcos	29,019	118.11	1905
Carazo	Santa Teresa	Santa Teresa	16,891	194	1860
Chinandega	Chichigalpa	Chichigalpa	44,769	222.54	1894
Chinandega	Chinandega	Chinandega	121,793	686.61	1839
Chinandega	Cinco Pinos	Cinco Pinos	6,781	60.38	1870
Chinandega	Corinto	Corinto	16,624	70.67	1858
Chinandega	El Realejo	El Realejo	8,838	104.54	1532
Chinandega	El Viejo	El Viejo	76,775	1,274.91	1673
Chinandega	Posoltega	Posoltega	16,771	124	1862
Chinandega	San Francisco del Norte	San Francisco del Norte	6,758	120.31	1889
Chinandega	San Pedro del Norte	San Pedro del Norte	4,719	71.5	1889
Chinandega	Santo Tomás del Norte	Santo Tomás del Norte	7,124	50	1889
Chinandega	Somotillo	Somotillo	29,030	1,089	1873
Chinandega	Puerto Morazán	Santa Rita de Tonalá	13,328	517	1946
Chinandega	Villanueva	Villanueva	25,660	779.88	1900
Chontales	Acoyapa	Acoyapa	16,946	1,381.79	1862
Chontales	Comalapa	Comalapa	11,785	643.86	1752
Chontales	El Coral	El Coral	7,039	306	1997
Chontales	Juigalpa	Juigalpa	51,838	726.75	1668
Chontales	La Libertad	La Libertad	11,429	774.55	1852
Chontales	San Francisco de Cuapa	San Francisco de Cuapa	5,507	277	1997
Chontales	San Pedro de Lóvago	San Pedro de Lóvago	7,650	466.50	1864
Chontales	Santo Domingo	Santo Domingo	12,182	681.71	1951
Chontales	Santo Tomás	Santo Tomás	16,404	546.6	1861
Chontales	Villa Sandino	Villa Sandino	13,152	676.51	1942
Estelí	Condega	Condega	28,481	398	1962
Estelí	Estelí	Estelí	112,084	795.7	1685
Estelí	La Trinidad	La Trinidad	20,140	261	1967
Estelí	Pueblo Nuevo	Pueblo Nuevo	20,620	222	—N/a
Estelí	San Juan de Limay	San Juan de Limay	13,455	530.9	1891
Estelí	San Nicolás	San Nicolás	6,768	163	1892
Granada	Diriá	Diriá	6,375	26	—N/a
Granada	Diriomo	Diriomo	22,352	50.08	—N/a
Granada	Granada	Granada	105,171	531	1524
Granada	Nandaime	Nandaime	34,288	372.01	1890
Jinotega	El Cuá	El Cuá	43,305	637	2002
Jinotega	Jinotega	Jinotega	99,382	1,119	1891
Jinotega	La Concordia	La Concordia	6,486	122	1851
Jinotega	San José de Bocay	San José de Bocay	42,029	3,990	2002
Jinotega	San Rafael del Norte	San Rafael del Norte	17,789	606	1848
Jinotega	San Sebastián de Yalí	San Sebastián de Yalí	26,979	311	1908
Jinotega	Santa María de Pantasma	Las Praderas	37,880	563	1989
Jinotega	Wiwilí de Jinotega	Wiwilí de Jinotega	57,485	2,444.7	1989
León	Achuapa	Achuapa	13,797	416.24	1870
León	El Jicaral	El Jicaral	10,326	434	1834
León	El Sauce	El Sauce	27,900	629.97	1858
León	La Paz Centro	La Paz Centro	28,118	606	1610
León	Larreynaga	Malpaisillo	27,898	882	1936
León	León	León	174,051	820.19	1524
León	Nagarote	Nagarote	32,303	598.38	1548
León	Quezalguaque	Quezalguaque	8,591	86	1865
León	Santa Rosa del Peñón	Santa Rosa del Peñón	9,529	227.6	1858
León	Telica	Telica	23,266	400	1858
Madriz	Las Sabanas	Las Sabanas	4,136	69	1942
Madriz	Palacagüina	Palacagüina	12,825	192	—N/a
Madriz	San José de Cusmapa	San José de Cusmapa	7,072	130	—N/a
Madriz	San Juan del Río Coco	San Juan del Río Coco	21,114	182	1964
Madriz	San Lucas	San Lucas	12,975	139	1913
Madriz	Somoto	Somoto	33,788	466	1867
Madriz	Telpaneca	Telpaneca	19,025	300	1626
Madriz	Totogalpa	Totogalpa	11,927	137	1911
Madriz	Yalagüina	Yalagüina	9,597	53	1725
Managua	Ciudad Sandino	Ciudad Sandino	75,083	51.11	2000
Managua	El Crucero	El Crucero	13,656	975.3	2000
Managua	Managua	Managua	937,489	289	1819
Managua	Mateare	Mateare	28,775	297.4	1898
Managua	San Francisco Libre	San Francisco Libre	9,416	756	1961
Managua	San Rafael del Sur	San Rafael del Sur	42,417	357.3	1956
Managua	Ticuantepe	Ticuantepe	27,008	60.79	1974
Managua	Tipitapa	Tipitapa	101,685	975.17	1755
Managua	Villa El Carmen	Villa El Carmen	27,449	562.01	1907
Masaya	Catarina	Catarina	7,524	11.49	—N/a
Masaya	La Concepción	La Concepción	31,950	73	1889
Masaya	Masatepe	Masatepe	31,583	62	—N/a
Masaya	Masaya	Masaya	139,582	141	1819
Masaya	Nandasmo	Nandasmo	10,732	13	1976
Masaya	Nindirí	Nindirí	38,355	142.91	1500
Masaya	Niquinohomo	Niquinohomo	14,847	31.69	1870
Masaya	San Juan de Oriente	San Juan de Oriente	4,734	13.8	1585
Masaya	Tisma	Tisma	10,681	108	1883
Matagalpa	Ciudad Darío	Ciudad Darío	41,014	432	1920
Matagalpa	Esquipulas	Esquipulas	15,877	216	1944
Matagalpa	Matagalpa	Matagalpa	133,416	619.36	1538
Matagalpa	Matiguás	Matiguas	41,127	1,710	1920
Matagalpa	Muy Muy	Muy Muy	14,721	375	1751
Matagalpa	Rancho Grande	Rancho Grande	26,223	648	1989
Matagalpa	Río Blanco	Río Blanco	30,785	700	1974
Matagalpa	San Dionisio	San Dionisio	16,273	152	1830
Matagalpa	San Isidro	San Isidro	17,412	282.71	1862
Matagalpa	San Ramón	San Ramón	30,682	424	1905
Matagalpa	Sébaco	Sébaco	32,221	289.81	1989
Matagalpa	Terrabona	Terrabona	12,740	248.89	1715
Matagalpa	Tuma-La Dalia	La Dalia	56,681	462	1989
North Caribbean Coast	Bonanza	Bonanza	18,633	2,039	1985
North Caribbean Coast	Mulukukú	Mulukukú	29,838	1,904.53	2004
North Caribbean Coast	Prinzapolka	Prinzapolka	16,105	7,020.48	1971
North Caribbean Coast	Puerto Cabezas	Puerto Cabezas	66,169	5,984.81	1929
North Caribbean Coast	Rosita	Rosita	22,723	4,418	1989
North Caribbean Coast	Siuna	Siuna	64,092	5,039.81	1969
North Caribbean Coast	Waslala	Waslala	49,339	1,329.51	1989
North Caribbean Coast	Waspam	Waspam	47,231	9,341.71	1956
Nueva Segovia	Ciudad Antigua	Ciudad Antigua	4,868	154	1611
Nueva Segovia	Dipilto	Dipilto	5,207	108	1942
Nueva Segovia	El Jícaro	El Jícaro	25,901	278	1874
Nueva Segovia	Wiwilí de Nueva Segovia	Wiwilí de Nueva Segovia	16,344	398	1970
Nueva Segovia	Jalapa	Jalapa	54,491	629	1891
Nueva Segovia	Macuelizo	Macuelizo	6,076	250	1815
Nueva Segovia	Mozonte	Mozonte	6,795	242	—N/a
Nueva Segovia	Murra	Murra	14,847	479	1872
Nueva Segovia	Ocotal	Ocotal	34,580	85.64	1780
Nueva Segovia	Quilalí	Quilalí	26,461	339	1920
Nueva Segovia	San Fernando	San Fernando	8,549	269	1897
Nueva Segovia	Santa María	Santa María	4,404	168	1850
Río San Juan	El Almendro	El Almendro	13,363	993	1974
Río San Juan	El Castillo	Boca de Sábalos	19,864	1,656	—N/a
Río San Juan	Morrito	Morrito	6,570	677	1989
Río San Juan	San Carlos	San Carlos	37,461	1,462	1949
Río San Juan	San Juan de Nicaragua	Grey Town	1,307	1,462	—N/a
Río San Juan	San Miguelito	San Miguelito	17,031	923	1850
Rivas	Altagracia	Altagracia	19,955	211.21	—N/a
Rivas	Belén	Belén	16,428	246.26	1892
Rivas	Buenos Aires	Buenos Aires	5,420	75.22	1717
Rivas	Cárdenas	Cárdenas	6,990	226.63	—N/a
Rivas	Moyogalpa	Moyogalpa	9,729	63	—N/a
Rivas	Potosí	Potosí	11,904	146	—N/a
Rivas	Rivas	Rivas	41,080	280.54	1835
Rivas	San Jorge	San Jorge	8,024	22	1852
Rivas	San Juan del Sur	San Juan del Sur	14,741	411.05	1851
Rivas	Tola	Tola	22,012	474	1750
South Caribbean Coast	Bluefields	Bluefields	45,547	4,774.75	1894
South Caribbean Coast	Corn Islands	Brig Bay	6,626	12.9	1971
South Caribbean Coast	Desembocadura de Río Grande	Karawala	3,585	1,978	1996
South Caribbean Coast	El Ayote	El Ayote	12,417	831	2000
South Caribbean Coast	El Tortuguero	El Tortuguero	22,324	2,471	1996
South Caribbean Coast	Kukra Hill	Kukra Hill	8,789	1,262	1989
South Caribbean Coast	La Cruz de Río Grande	La Cruz de Río Grande	23,284	3,360	1982
South Caribbean Coast	Muelle de los Bueyes	Muelle de los Bueyes	22,082	1,391	1942
South Caribbean Coast	Nueva Guinea	Nueva Guinea	66,936	2,774	1981
South Caribbean Coast	Paiwas	Bocana de Paiwas	31,762	2,375	1974
South Caribbean Coast	Pearl Lagoon	Pearl City	10,676	3,876	—N/a
South Caribbean Coast	El Rama	El Rama	52,482	5,618	1910

== Gallery ==
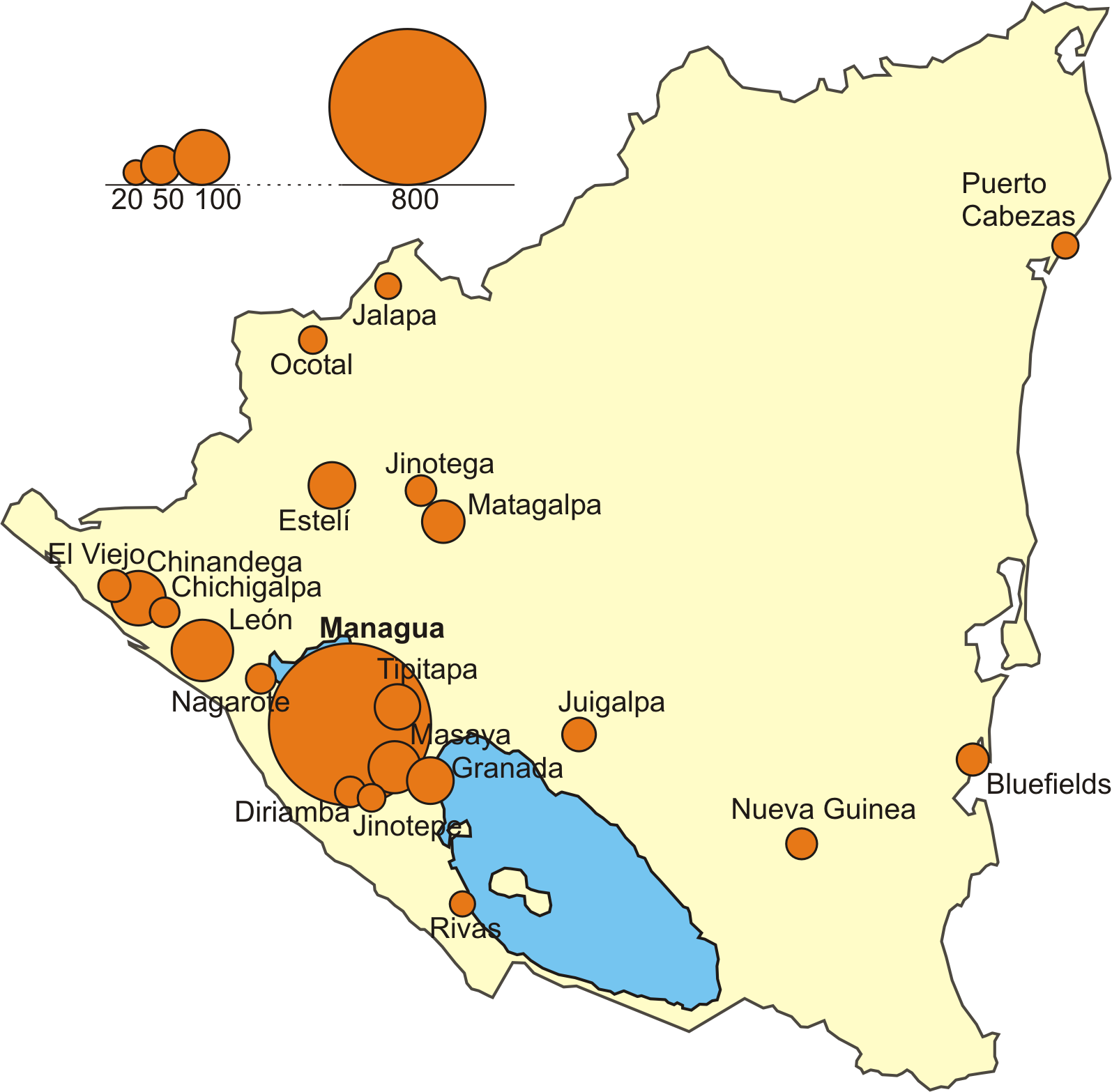
Cities over 20,000 inhabitants in Nicaragua (1995 census)

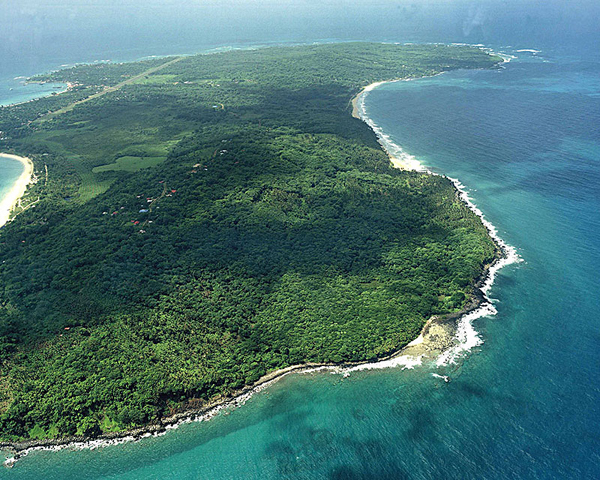
Aerial view of Corn Island

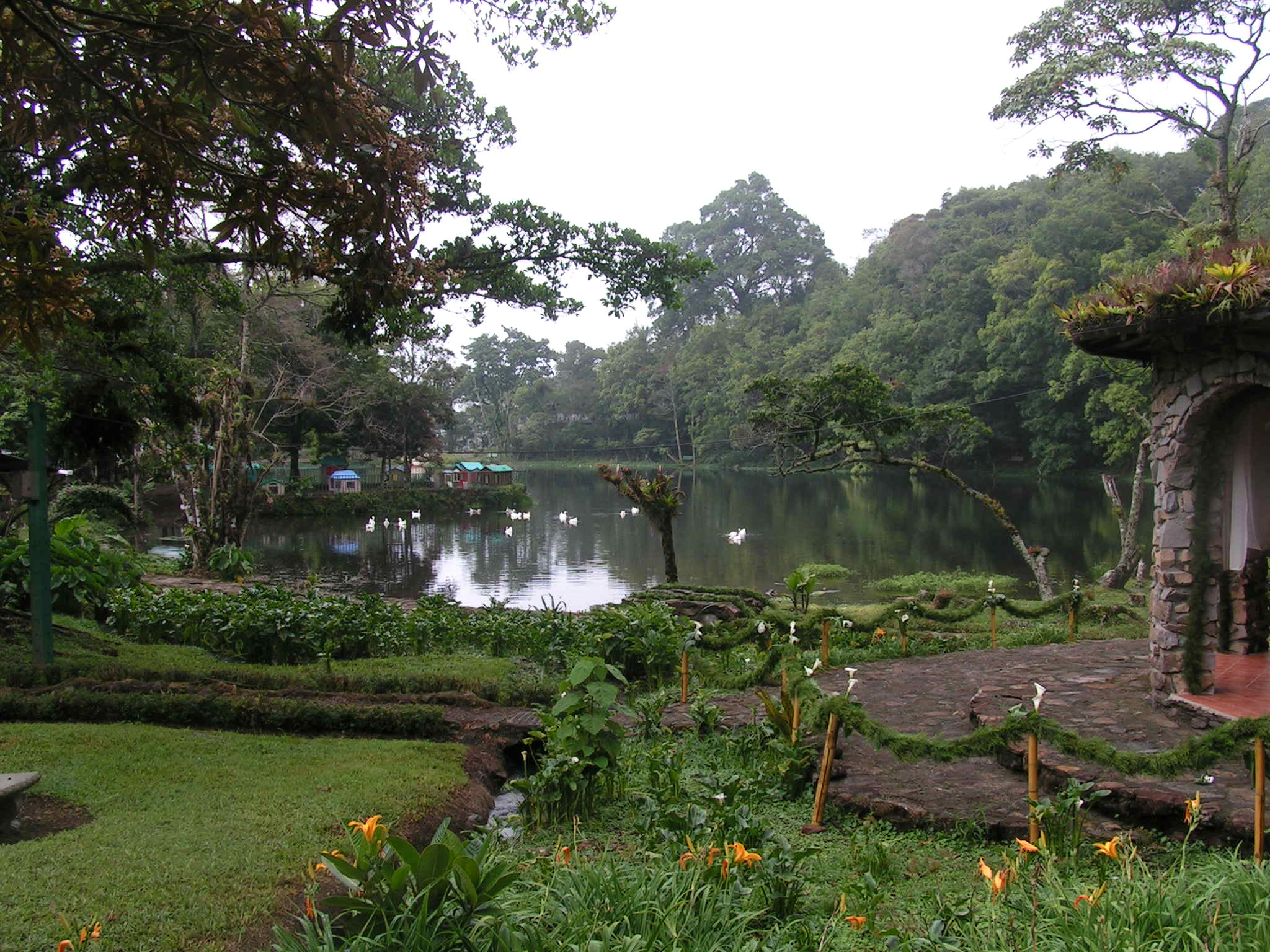
Selva Negra in Matagalpa

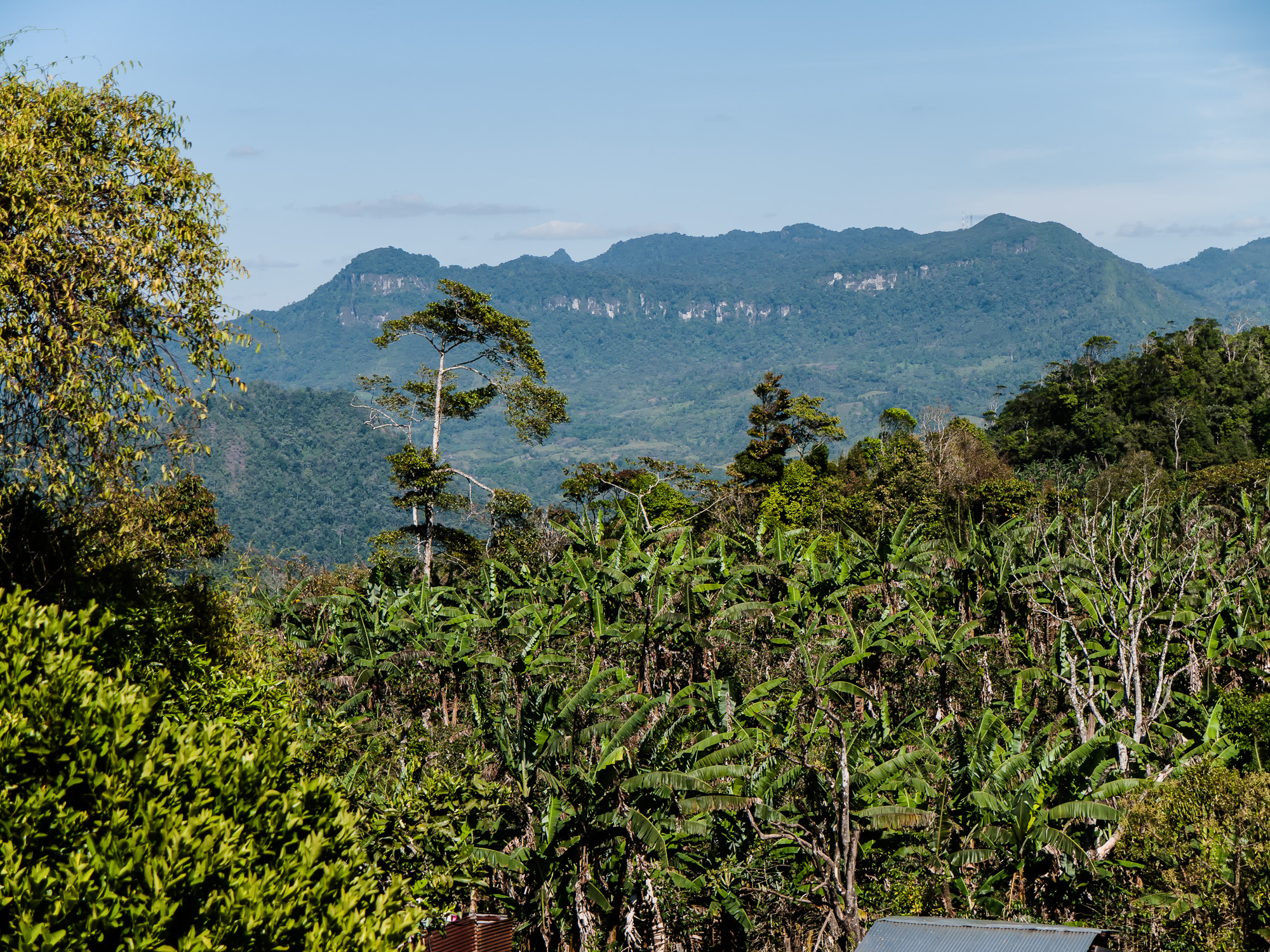
Peñas Blancas, part of the Bosawás Biosphere Reserve in Jinotega.

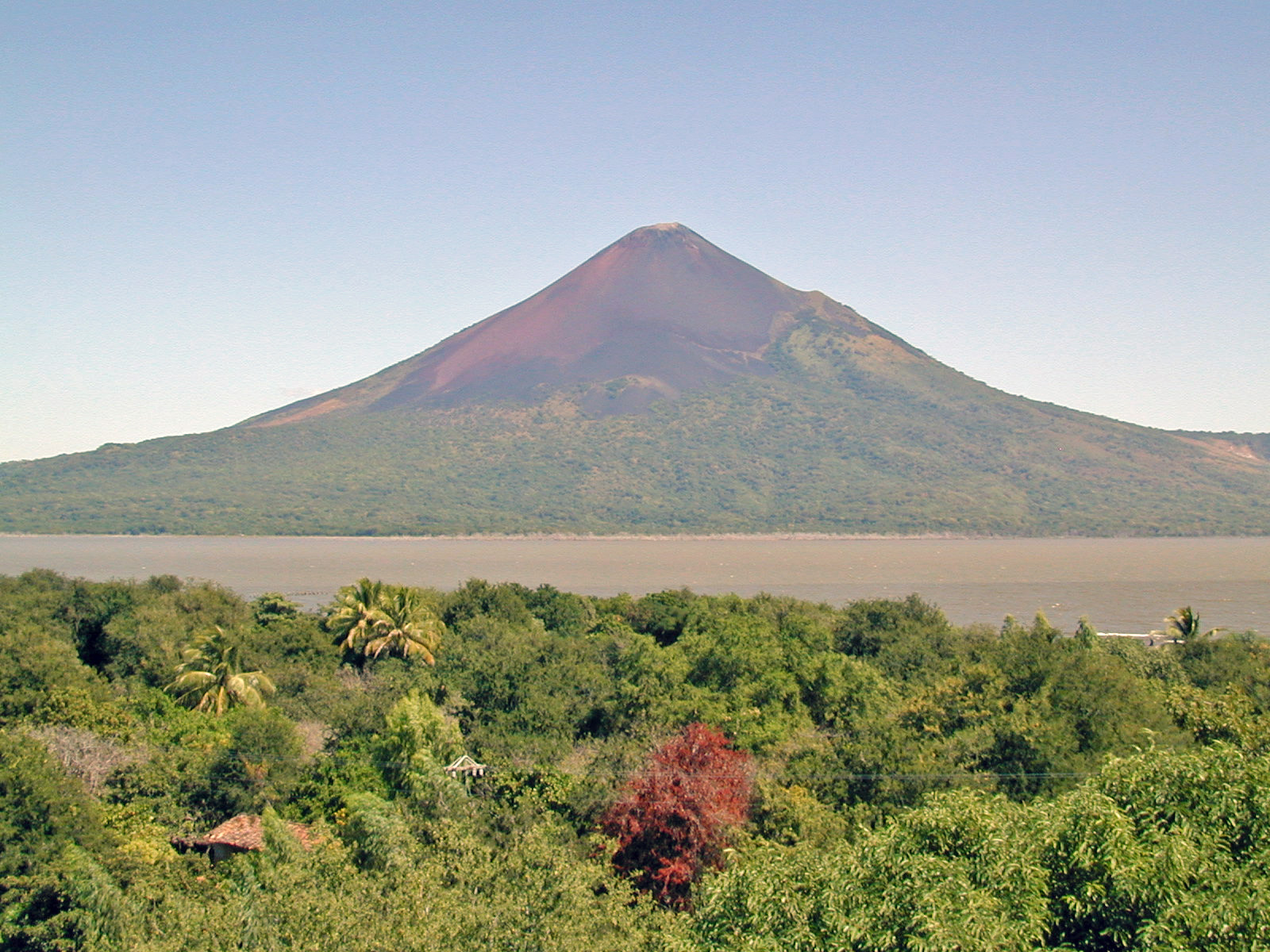
Momotombo volcano in La Paz Centro

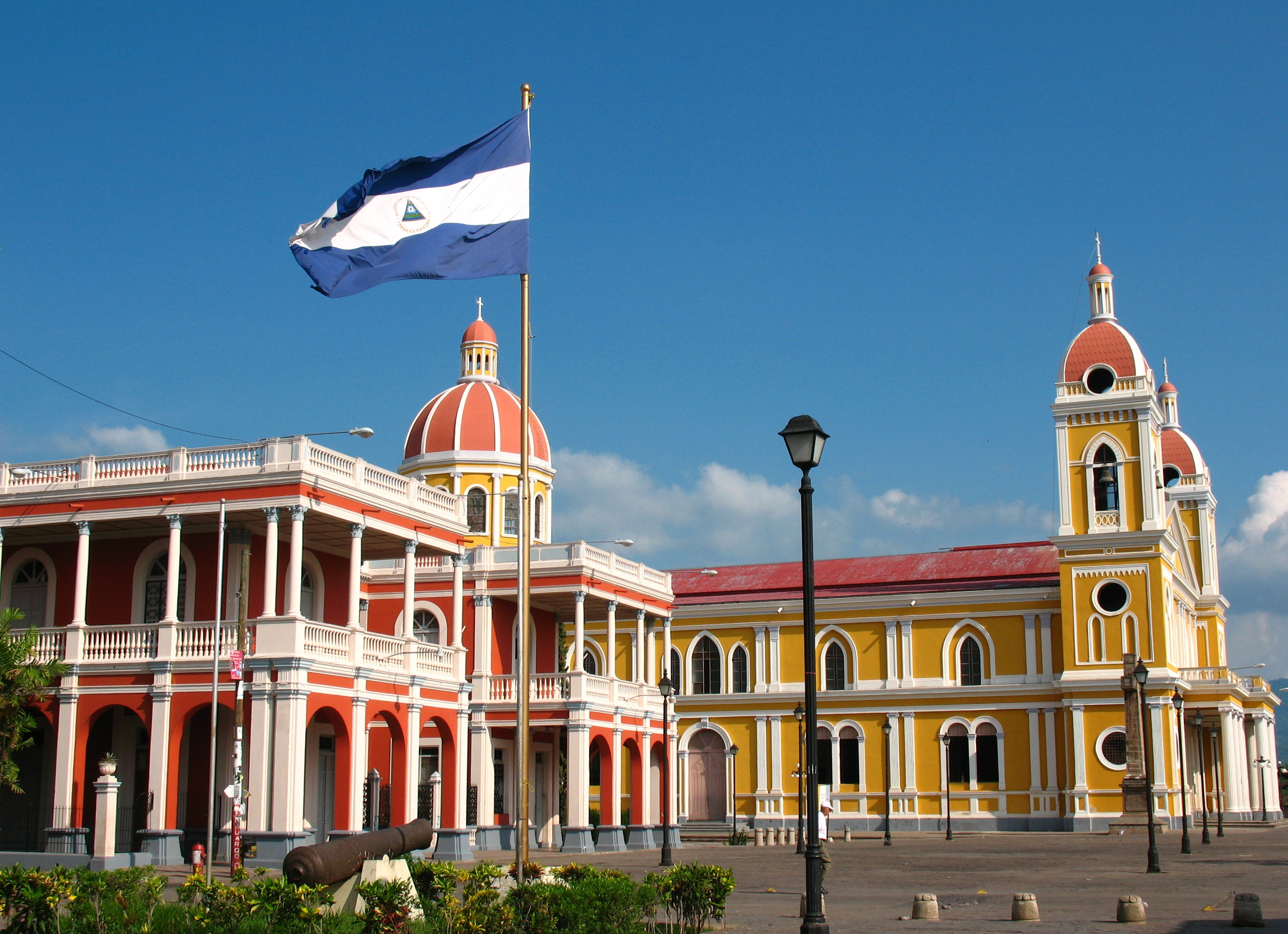
Colonial city of Granada

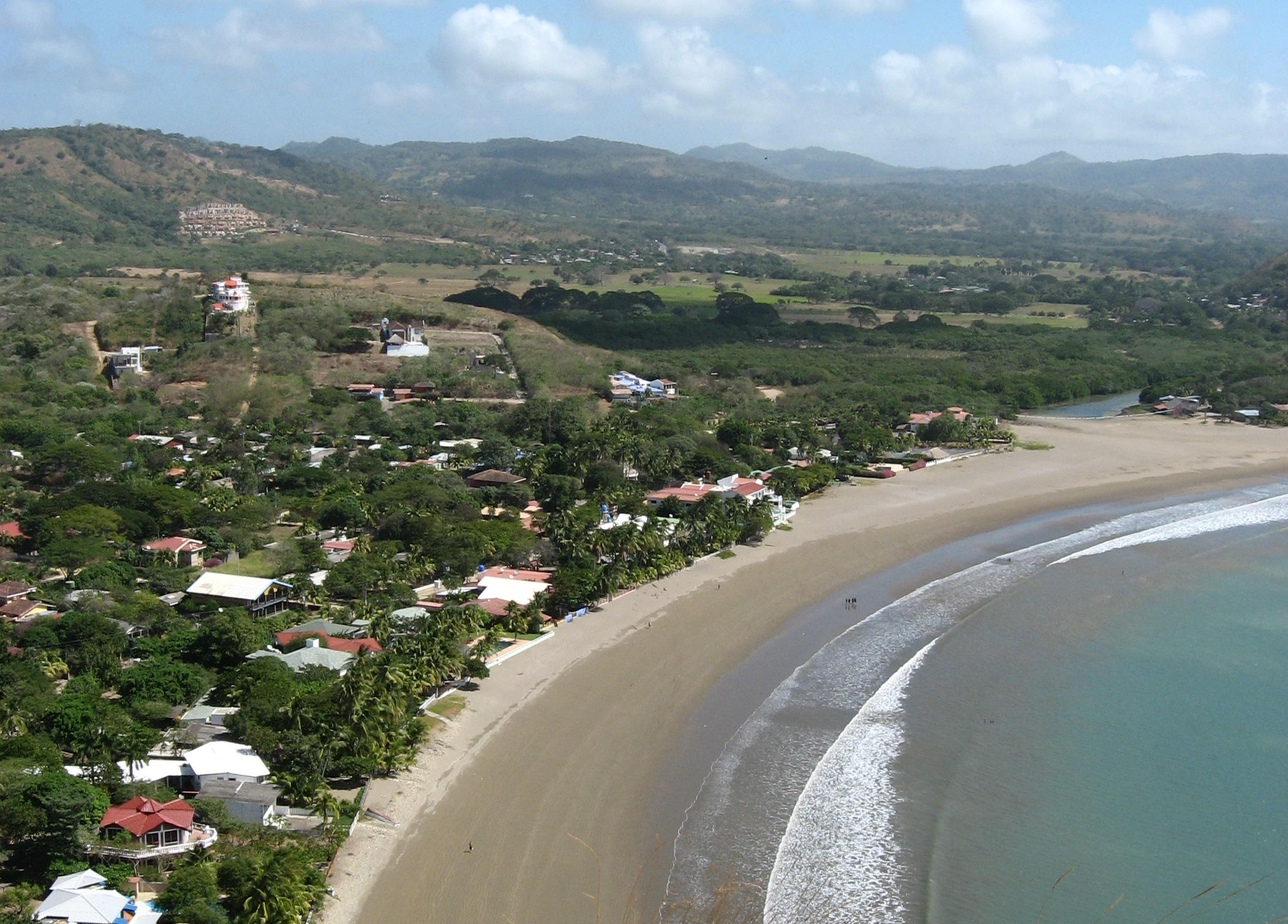
The bay of San Juan del Sur

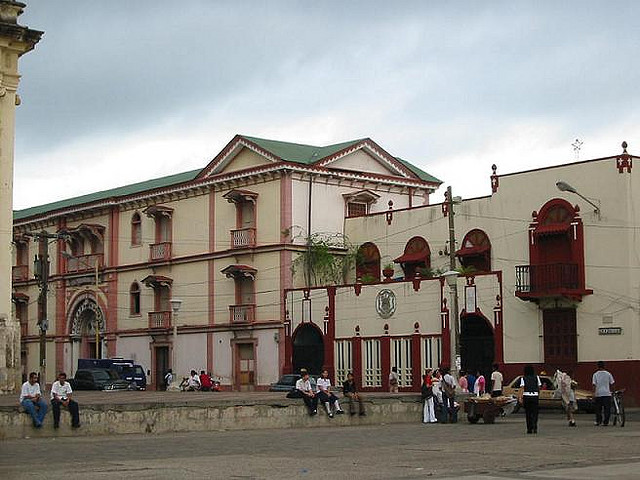
Street in León, next to the Cathedral
