= Desembocadura de Río Grande =

Municipality in Nicaragua

- Municipality
- Location in Nicaragua
- Coordinates: 12°55′55″N 83°34′37″W
- Country: Nicaragua
- Department: South Caribbean Coast Autonomous Region

Area
  - Municipality: 671.16 sq mi (1,738.29 km^{2})

Population (2023 estimate)
  - Municipality: 4,086
  - Urban: 3,015

Desembocadura de Río Grande (lit. Mouth of the Big River) is a municipality of the South Caribbean Coast Autonomous Region in the Republic of Nicaragua. The head town is the locality of Karawala.

== Geography ==
The municipal term borders to the north with the municipality of Prinzapolka, to the south with the municipalities of Laguna de Perlas and El Tortuguero, to the east with the Caribbean Sea and to the west with the municipality of La Cruz de Río Grande. The municipal head town is located 470 kilometers from the capital, Managua.

== History ==
The territory was formerly inhabited by the Miskito and Ulua peoples. In the mid-seventeenth century, the different ethnic groups of the Caribbean Coast of Nicaragua were militarily dominated and subordinated by the Miskitos allied with English pirates, thanks to their numerical superiority and having firearms provided by the latter.

In 1860, the Mosquitia Reserve on the eastern (Caribbean or Atlantic) coast of Nicaragua was created by an agreement between the English and American governments, until in 1894 during the government of José Santos Zelaya it was incorporated into the national territory.

In the early twentieth century, American banana and timber companies settled in the region, and the ruins of the machinery they used and later abandoned are still preserved. In the 1950s, the last enclave companies left, and from then on, the local economy became subsistence-based, based on hunting, fishing, and subsistence agriculture.

The municipality was founded in 1996, by a split from the municipality of La Cruz de Río Grande, which is located further up the same river.

== Economy ==
The main economic activities are agriculture and fishing.

== Demographics ==
Karawala has a current population of 4,068 inhabitants. Of the total population, 49.5% are men and 50.5% are women. Almost 73.5% of the population lives in the urban area.

== Nature and Climate ==
The climate is tropical humid rainforest, mainly on the Atlantic coast, with tropical monsoons in the western part that borders with La Cruz de Río Grande. Its average temperature is 26 °C, and rainfall ranges between 3200 and 4000 mm. The municipality is mainly located on the Atlantic Coastal Plain, characterized by a dominant relief that is flat to strongly undulating, with slopes that fluctuate between 0 and 15%.

== Localities ==
The territorial organization of the municipality consists of six communities and two sectors: Karawala (uluas), Kara (miskitos), La Esperanza (miskitos), La Barra (creoles), Sandy Bay (miskitos), Sector Guadalupe (miskitos), Walpa (miskitos) and Sector Company Creek (mestizos).

== Culture ==
The Miskito and Creole languages are the most used in the municipality; while Spanish is ordinarily spoken only by the respective populations. The Ulua language is extinct.

The population is multilingual, as most people speak the three aforementioned languages.

== Transport ==
There are no roads to speak of in Karawala. All longer transports are done by boat, along the rivers and the coast. There is no regular boat traffic. For longer trips to the municipalities, it is often possible to hitch a ride with someone, even if you may have to wait a few days. For shorter trips within the municipality, most families have their own boat.

== See also ==
- Municipalities of Nicaragua
