= Villa El Carmen =

Villa El Carmen Villa Carlos Fonseca
- Municipality
- Location in Nicaragua
- Coordinates: 11°58′N 86°31′W
- Country: Nicaragua
- Department: Managua

Area
  - Municipality: 217 sq mi (562 km^{2})

Population (2022 estimate)
  - Municipality: 38,495
  - Density: 177/sq mi (68.5/km^{2})
  - Urban: 12,261

Villa El Carmen, also known as Villa Carlos Fonseca, is a town and a municipality in the Managua department of Nicaragua. Its sister city is Moscow, Idaho.

== International relations ==
=== Twin towns – Sister cities ===
Villa el Carmen is twinned with:

- (United States) Moscow, Idaho
