= University of the Autonomous Regions of the Nicaraguan Caribbean Coast =

Nicaraguan university

- Universidad de las Regiones Autónomas de la Costa Caribe Nicaragüense (URACCAN)
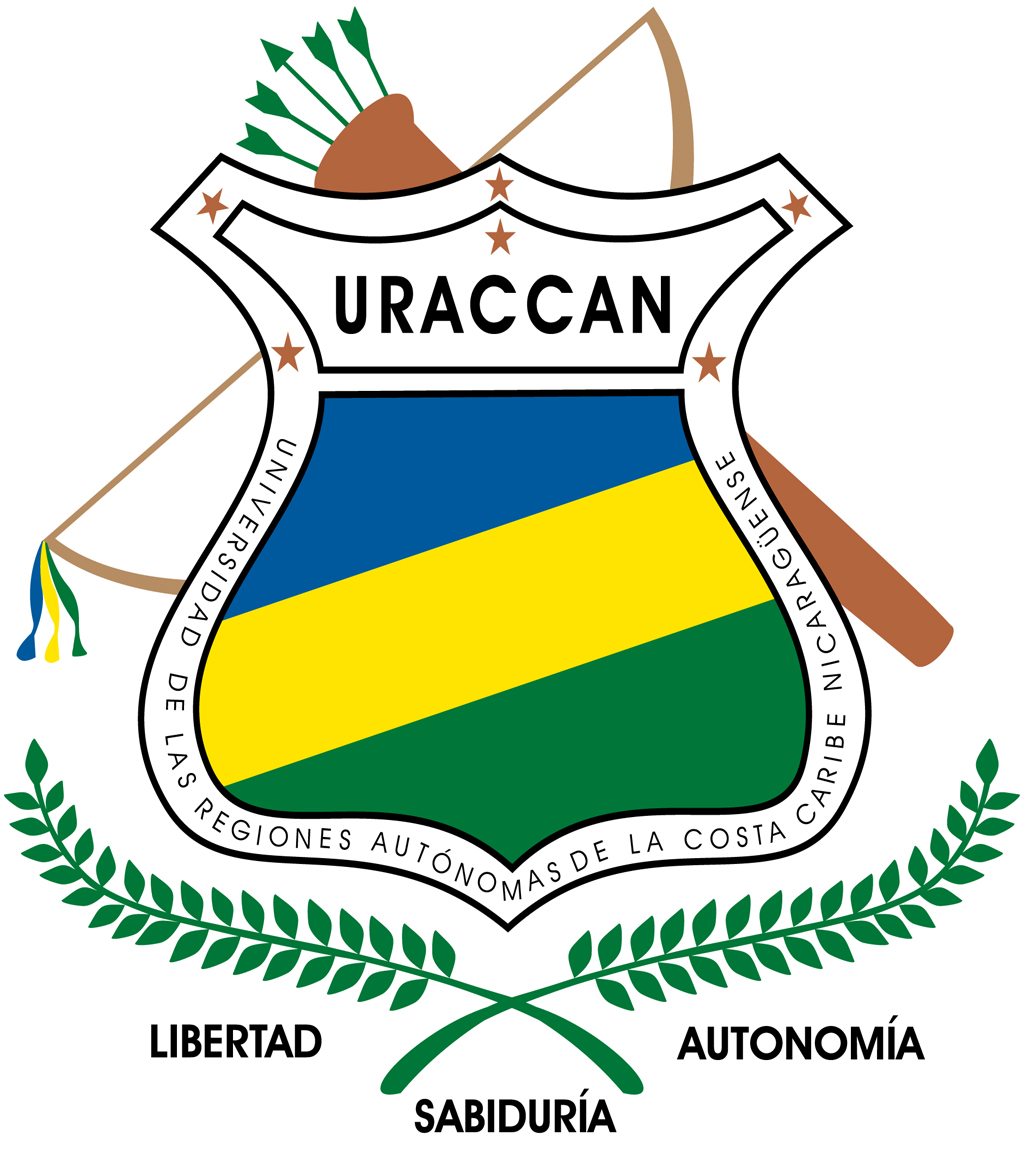
- Established: 1994
- Location: Puerto Cabezas, Nicaragua
- Nickname: URACCAN
- Website: www.uraccan.edu.ni

The University of the Autonomous Regions of the Nicaraguan Caribbean Coast (Spanish: Universidad de las Regiones Autónomas de la Costa Caribe Nicaragüense, abbreviated URACCAN), is a university founded in 1994. It is described as an "intercultural university community for indigenous peoples and ethnic communities".

== Campuses ==
The university has four campuses located throughout the country's two autonomous regions.

=== North Caribbean Coast Autonomous Region ===
- Puerto Cabezas
- Siuna

=== South Caribbean Coast Autonomous Region ===
- Bluefields
- Nueva Guinea
