= Santo Tomás, Nicaragua =

Santo Tomás
- Municipality
- Location in Nicaragua
- Coordinates: 12°4′N 85°4′W
- Country: Nicaragua
- Department: Chontales Department

Area
  - Total: 211.0 sq mi (546.6 km^{2})

Population (2023 estimate)
  - Total: 19,392
  - Density: 91.89/sq mi (35.48/km^{2})

Santo Tomás is a town and a municipality in the Chontales Department of Nicaragua. It occupies an area of 546.6 km^{2} (211.0 sq mi), and as per 2023 estimate, the municipality has a population of 19,932 individuals. It became a municipality in 1861.

== History ==
During the early colonial period, the local Indigenous population was repeatedly displaced by attacks originating from the Caribbean region. After moving several times, the inhabitants eventually settled between Acoyapa and San Pedro de Lóvago. In 1752, Bishop Pedro Morel de Santa Cruz described the settlement as a town with scattered houses located on a mountainous terrain, with a population of about 250 inhabitants. On 12 April 1861, the municipality was relocated to its present site, replacing the older settlement of Lovigüisca, and was named as Santo Tomas in honour of Nicaraguan president Tomás Martínez, who authorized the transfer and inaugurated the settlement. Santo Tomás became a municipality in 1861 and was later elevated to city status in 1972.

== Geography ==
Santo Tomas is a municipality in the Chontales Department of Nicaragua. It occupies an area of 546.6 km^{2} (211.0 sq mi). The municipality is bordered by the municipalities of Santo Domingo and San Pedro de Lóvago to the north, Villa Sandino and Acoyapa to the south, Muelle de los Bueyes to the east, and San Pedro de Lóvago to the west. It is located 180 km (110 mi) from the Nicaraguan capital of Managua.

The Serranías de Santo Tomás form part of the wider Chontales mountain range and covers much of the municipality’s territory. The highest peak is the Cerro Aragua, which rises to 700 m (2,300 ft). The hills are covered by thick vegetation, especially towards the east. Several rivers and their associated wetlands form part of the municipality. These include the Quipur River, Estero de Matagua, Zapote, Paso de Lajas, El Caracol, Bulúm, Caño Oropéndola, Copelar, and the Mico River.

== Demographics and economy ==
As per 2023 estimate, Santo Tomas has a population of 19,392 individuals of whom 9,433 were male and 9,959 were female. About 75% of the population lived in urban areas, and rest of the population was classified as rural.

The economy of the municipality is based on agriculture and livestock rearing. Major agricultural produce include bananas and tubers.
