= San Francisco del Norte =

- Municipality
- Location in Nicaragua
- Coordinates: 13°12′N 86°46′W
- Country: Nicaragua
- Department: Chinandega

Area
  - Municipality: 46 sq mi (120 km^{2})

Population (2005)
  - Municipality: 6,758
  - Density: 150/sq mi (56/km^{2})
  - Urban: 902

San Francisco del Norte (Spanish pronunciation: [saɱ fɾanˈsisko ðel ˈnoɾte]) is a municipality in the Chinandega department of Nicaragua.
