= Terrabona =

- Municipality
- Location in Nicaragua
- Coordinates: 12°44′N 85°58′W
- Country: Nicaragua
- Department: Matagalpa

Area
  - Municipality: 96 sq mi (249 km^{2})

Population (2005)
  - Municipality: 12,740
  - Density: 133/sq mi (51.2/km^{2})
  - Urban: 1,753
- Climate: Aw

Terrabona is a municipality in the Matagalpa department of Nicaragua.

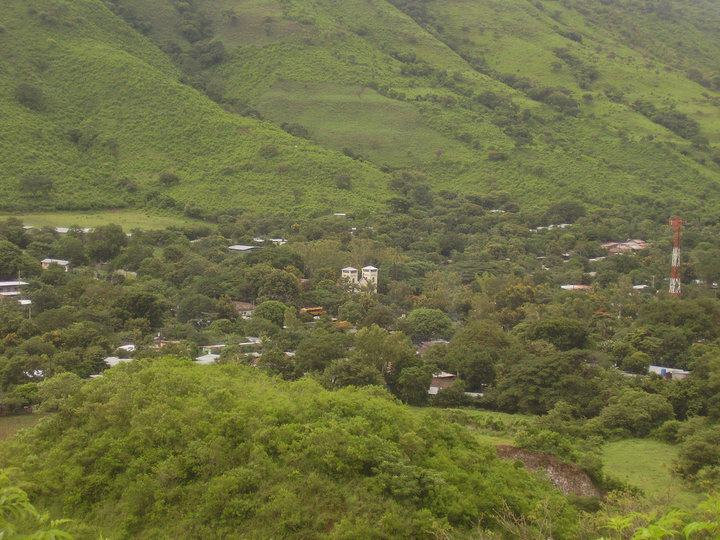
Terrabona
