= Tasbapauni =

- Village
- Location in Nicaragua
- Coordinates: 12°44′N 83°35′W
- Country: Nicaragua
- Department: South Caribbean Coast Autonomous Region

Tasbapauni is a seacoast hamlet in Nicaragua, 72 kilometres (45 mi) north of Bluefields. The main ethnic groups are Creole and Miskito.

Ida, a hurricane from the 2009 Atlantic Hurricane Season, made landfall here.

Tasbapauni is a rich community in natural resources: lumber, lobster, turtle etc.

== See also ==
- Whisky Galore (novel)

== Sources ==
Carroll, Rory (2007-10-09). "Cocaine galore! Villagers live it up on profits from 'white lobster': Washed-up bales of drugs bring millions of dollars to poor fishing communities". The Guardian.

Hale, Charles R. (1996). Resistance and Contradiction: Miskitu Indians and the Nicaraguan State, 1894-1987. Stanford University Press. ISBN 0-8047-2800-3.
