= Santa Rosa del Peñón =

- Municipality
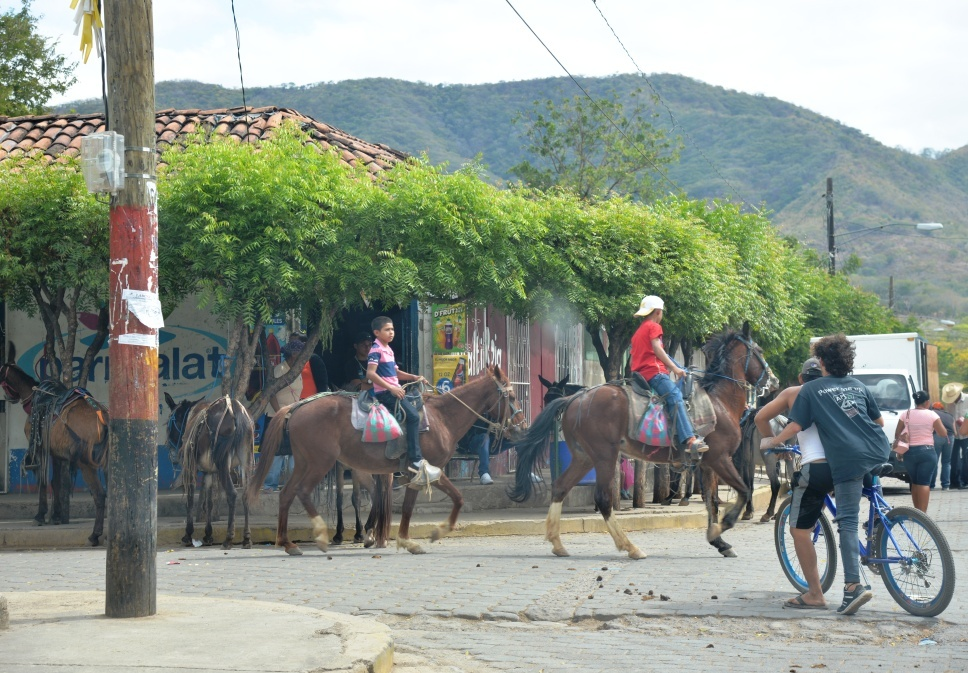
- Horses in the Town

- Location in Nicaragua
- Coordinates: 12°48′N 86°22′W
- Country: Nicaragua
- Department: León

Area
  - Municipality: 88 sq mi (228 km^{2})

Population (2005)
  - Municipality: 9,529
  - Density: 108/sq mi (41.8/km^{2})
  - Urban: 1,852

Santa Rosa del Peñón (Spanish pronunciation: [ˈsanta ˈrosa ðel peˈɲon]) is a municipality in the León department of Nicaragua.
