= La Paz de Carazo =

La Paz de Oriente
- Municipality
- Location in Nicaragua
- Coordinates: 11°49′N 86°08′W
- Country: Nicaragua
- Department: Carazo Department

Area
  - Municipality: 6.2 sq mi (16 km^{2})

Population (2005)
  - Municipality: 4,657
  - Density: 750/sq mi (290/km^{2})
  - Urban: 2,375

La Paz de Oriente is a municipality in the Carazo department of Nicaragua.
