= El Crucero =

- Municipality
- Location in Nicaragua
- Coordinates: 11°59′N 86°19′W
- Country: Nicaragua
- Department: Managua

Government
  - Mayor: Martha Solieth Marenco Ramos

Area
  - Municipality: 87 sq mi (226 km^{2})

Population (2022 estimate)
  - Municipality: 16,127
  - Density: 185/sq mi (71.4/km^{2})
  - Urban: 10,435

El Crucero (Spanish pronunciation: [el kɾuˈseɾo]) is a municipality in the Managua department of Nicaragua.

It is located on the summit and slopes of the Sierras de Managua, east of Jinotepe, and its urban center is the town of El Crucero.
