= La Concordia, Nicaragua =

La Concordia
- Municipality
- Location in Nicaragua
- Coordinates: 13°11′N 86°10′W
- Country: Nicaragua
- Department: Jinotega

Area
  - Municipality: 58 sq mi (151 km^{2})

Population (2017)
  - Municipality: 7.320
  - Density: 0.126/sq mi (0.0485/km^{2})
  - Urban: 1.546
- Climate: Aw

La Concordia (Spanish pronunciation: [la koŋˈkoɾðja]) is a municipality in the Jinotega department of Nicaragua.

== Twin towns ==
La Concordia is twinned with:

- Canfranc, Spain
