= Acoyapa =

- Municipality
- Flag

- Location in Nicaragua
- Coordinates: 11°58′7″N 85°10′19″W
- Country: Nicaragua
- Department: Chontales Department

Area
  - Total: 1,382 km^{2} (534 sq mi)
- Elevation: 99.9 m (328 ft)

Population (2023 estimate)
  - Total: 20,465
  - Density: 14.81/km^{2} (38.35/sq mi)

Acoyapa is a town and a municipality in the Chontales Department of Nicaragua. It occupied an area of 1,382 km^{2} (534 sq mi), and as per 2023 estimate, the municipality has a population of 20,465 individuals. It was a major commercial and transportation hub in the 19th century, and briefly served as the capital of the department. The economy is primarily dependent on agriculture and livestock rearing.

== Etymology ==
The origin of the name "Acoyapa" has several theories. The name might derive from "Acoyaph" which means "place from above" or "branch of the heaven". As per some historians, it might have come from the indigenous Nahuatl term meaning "river of tears" while others meaning include "place of peccaries", "watchtower", and "moonstone".

== History ==
As per archaeological evidence, stone sculptures, tools, and other objects have been found, indicating that the region might have been occupied by a disappeared civilization of people associated with the Chontal cultural group earlier. The present settlement of Acoyapa was developed in the mid-17th century, when the Spanish relocated from the abandoned settlement of Nueva Jaén at the confluence of Lake Nicaragua and the San Juan River. In the 19th century, it was a major commercial center and transportation hub, linking several mining towns. It has a church built during the Spanish colonial occupation, dedicated to San Sebastián. Acoyapa was the capital of Chontales Department, when it was established, and the capital alternated with Juigalpa between 1858 and 1877 before Juigalpa became the permanent capital.

== Geography ==
Acoyapa is located in the Chontales Department of Nicaragua. It occupies an area of 1,382 km^{2} (534 sq mi). The municipality is bordered by Juigalpa, San Pedro de Lóvago, and Santo Tomás municipalities to the north, by Villa Sandino and El Coral municipalities to the east, by El Almendro and Morrito municipalities to the south, and by Lake Nicaragua to the west. It is located 32 km (20 mi) from the departmental capital of Juigalpa and 170 km (110 mi) from the Nicaraguan capital of Managua. The El Nancital archipelago forms part of the municipality. A 153 km (95 mi)-long road, completed in 2009, connects the town to the Costa Rican border.

== Demographics and economy ==
As per 2023 estimate, Acoyapa has a population of 20,412 individuals of whom 10,152 were males and 10,313 were females. The urban population was 10,436 (50.8%) and the rest of the population was classified as living in rural areas.

The economy of the municipality is based on agriculture and livestock rearing. Major agricultural produce include maize, beans, rice, and sorghum. Fishing is practised along the coast. In the mid 20th century, it was known as the "landowner's capital" due to its large cattle ranches.
