= La Cruz de Río Grande =

Municipality in Nicaragua

- Municipality
- Location in Nicaragua
- Coordinates: 13°07′N 84°11′W
- Country: Nicaragua
- Department: South Caribbean Coast Autonomous Region

Area
  - Municipality: 1,331.48 sq mi (3,448.52 km^{2})

Population (2023)
  - Municipality: 49,445
  - Density: 37.135/sq mi (14.338/km^{2})
  - Urban: 7,705
- Climate: Am

La Cruz de Río Grande is a municipality in the South Caribbean Coast Autonomous Region of Nicaragua. According to the 2005 census, the population of La Cruz de Rio Grande was 3,000. It gets its name from the Rio Grande de Matagalpa which flows through it.

== Geography ==
The municipal term borders to the north with the municipality of Prinzapolka, to the south with the municipality of El Tortuguero, to the east with the municipality of Desembocadura, and to the west with the municipalities of Mulukukú and Paiwas.

The municipal seat is located 410 kilometers from the capital of Managua.

== History ==
There are no clear references about the original inhabitants of the territory, which would have been a Miskito territory, although at the present moment there are very few inhabitants of that ethnicity left there.

La Cruz de Río Grande was founded, with the name of Río Grande, as a district in 1893 or shortly before. Known history begins in the second half of the 20th century when North American companies settled in the area creating enclaves for the production of bananas, rubber, raicilla, and wood. Amenities such as stores and large buildings, casinos, theaters, phonographs, telephones, air strips, all-weather roads, and railroads were installed, which attracted waves of migrant peasants from the Pacific, including many Chinese. The banana companies withdrew in 1940, their plantations were destroyed by Hurricane Irene.

With a split from La Cruz de Río Grande, in 1996 the municipalities of El Tortuguero and Desembocadura were formed.

== Demographics ==
La Cruz de Río Grande currently has a population of 49,445 inhabitants. Of the total population, 50.6% are men and 49.4% are women. Nearly 15.6% of the population lives in the urban area.

== Nature and climate ==
The municipality has a tropical monsoon climate, in which the average temperature ranges from 25 to 26 °C. Rainfall varies between 2800 and 3200 mm characterized by good distribution throughout the year.

The region is mainly located in the so-called Atlantic Coastal Plain, characterized by a predominantly flat or slightly sloping relief, which is sectioned by an abundant network of natural drains, providing good surface runoff; the soils derived from these materials are very acidic, very poor in bases, rich in aluminum, and of low fertility.

== Localities ==
The municipal territory is administratively divided into the municipal seat and 49 communities, grouped into the following ten microregions: Makantaka, Matagalpa, Muelle Real, San Miguel de Casa de Alto, Batitán, Uliwas, Aguas Calientes, Mayawas, Santo Domingo del Carmen, and La Cruz.

== Economy ==
Currently, the municipality is predominantly an agricultural and livestock area with small and medium production.

== Transport ==
La Cruz de Río Grande is one of the most isolated municipalities in the country. The roads are few and there is no road to the center of La Cruz de Río Grande from the rest of the country. The most important transport route is the Río Grande de Matagalpa, which crosses the municipality from west to east. In six hours, you can travel downstream by boat and by sea to Bluefields, or upstream to San Pedro del Norte in the municipality of Paiwas, from where there is a connecting road west to the rest of the country.

== See also ==
- Chinese Nicaraguan
- Municipalities of Nicaragua
