= El Jicaral =

- Municipality
- Location in Nicaragua
- Coordinates: 12°44′N 86°23′W
- Country: Nicaragua
- Department: León

Area
  - Municipality: 166 sq mi (431 km^{2})

Population (2005)
  - Municipality: 10,326
  - Density: 62.1/sq mi (24.0/km^{2})
  - Urban: 780

El Jicaral is a municipality in the León department of Nicaragua.
