= Quezalguaque =

- Municipality
- Location in Nicaragua
- Coordinates: 12°30′22″N 86°54′12″W
- Country: Nicaragua
- Department: León Department

Area
  - Municipality: 86 km^{2} (33 sq mi)
- Elevation: 86 m (282 ft)

Population (2005)
  - Municipality: 8,591
  - Density: 100/km^{2} (260/sq mi)
  - Urban: 1,233
- Time zone: UTC−6 (Central (CST))

Quezalguaque (Spanish pronunciation: [kesalˈɣwake]) is a municipality in the León Department of Nicaragua.

== International relations ==
=== Twin towns – Sister cities ===
Quezalguaque was a sister city with Brookline, Massachusetts, from 1987 until 2026, when the relationship was dissolved due to political interference from the Nicaraguan government
