= Macuelizo, Nicaragua =

Macuelizo
- Municipality
- Location in Nicaragua
- Coordinates: 13°39′N 86°37′W
- Country: Nicaragua
- Department: Nueva Segovia Department

Area
  - Municipality: 98 sq mi (255 km^{2})

Population (2005)
  - Municipality: 6,076
  - Urban: 247

Macuelizo (Spanish pronunciation: [makweˈliso]) is a municipality in the Nueva Segovia department of Nicaragua.
