= Pearl Cays =

Coordinates: 12°28′N 83°23′W

- Interactive map of Pearl Cays

The Pearl Cays (Spanish: Cayos Perlas) is a group of 18 cays located about 35 km (22 mi) from Pearl Lagoon (Spanish: Laguna de Perlas) off the Caribbean coast of Nicaragua. They are part of the South Caribbean Coast Autonomous Region. The Pearl Cays are covered with tropical vegetation and are lined with white sandy beaches. They are an important nesting site for turtles, including the critically endangered Hawksbill turtle.

== Wildlife refuge ==
In 2010, with the help of the Wildlife Conservation Society, the area was established as a wildlife refuge primarily to continue efforts to protect the critically endangered Hawksbill turtle.

== See also ==
- Greece–Nicaragua relations
