= Belén, Nicaragua =

Belén
- Municipality
- Location in Nicaragua
- Coordinates: 11°30′N 85°53′W
- Country: Nicaragua
- Department: Rivas Department

Area
  - Municipality: 95 sq mi (246 km^{2})

Population (2005)
  - Municipality: 16,428
  - Urban: 6,458

Belén is a municipality in the Rivas department of Nicaragua with approximately 22,000 inhabitants.
