= La Conquista, Nicaragua =

La Conquista
- Municipality
- Location in Nicaragua
- Coordinates: 11°44′N 86°12′W
- Country: Nicaragua
- Department: Carazo Department

Area
  - Municipality: 34 sq mi (88 km^{2})

Population
  - Municipality: 3,777
  - Density: 110/sq mi (43/km^{2})
  - Urban: 822

La Conquista is a municipality in the Carazo department of Nicaragua.
