= Comalapa, Nicaragua =

Comalapa
- Municipality
- Location in Nicaragua
- Coordinates: 12°17′02.37″N 85°30′44.27″W
- Country: Nicaragua
- Department: Chontales Department

Area
  - Total: 248.6 sq mi (643.9 km^{2})

Population (2023)
  - Total: 18,383
  - Density: 73.94/sq mi (28.55/km^{2})

Comalapa is a municipality in the Chontales Department of Nicaragua. It occupied an area of 643.9 km^{2} (248.6 sq mi), and as per 2023 estimate, the municipality has a population of 18,383 individuals.

== History ==
Comalapa is one of the oldest settlements in the department of Chontales. It was earlier known as Comalagualpan in Nahuatl, which later became Comalapan and Comalapa, in line with the Spanish usage of names. The origin of the name has several theories. As per one interpretation, it came from the Nahuatl meaning "place of water in containers", with "Comales" meaning depressions in the riverbed or river plants.

== Geography ==
Comalapa is a municipality in the Chontales Department of Nicaragua. It occupies an area of 643.9 km^{2} (248.6 sq mi). It is located in the northwestern part of the department, to the north of Lake Nicaragua, and extends to the base of the Sierra de Amerrique mountains. The coastal area includes the wetlands of La Pitahaya, the La Pelona peninsula, and the mouth of the Santa Clara river. There are several small hills and mountains on the shores of Lake Nicaragua, and the Miragua and Oluma peaks are situated towards the north east.

The municipality is bordered by the municipalities of Juigalpa, and Cuapa municipalities to the east, San Lorenzo to the west, and Camoapa to the north. It is located 130 km (81 mi) from the Nicaraguan capital of Managua.

== Demographics and economy ==
As per 2023 estimate, Comalpa has a population of 18,383 individuals of whom 9,688 males and 8,695 females. The urban population was 5,557 (30.2%) and the rest of the population (69.8%) was classified as living in rural areas.

The economy of the municipality is based on agriculture and livestock rearing. Major agricultural produce include maize, beans, sorghum, and fruits like mangoes and citrus fruits. The livestock rearing dates back to centuries, with several old large ranches.
