= El Rosario, Nicaragua =

El Rosario
- Municipality
- Location in Nicaragua
- Coordinates: 11°50′N 86°10′W
- Country: Nicaragua
- Department: Carazo Department

Area
  - Municipality: 5.4 sq mi (14 km^{2})

Population (2005)
  - Municipality: 5,317
  - Urban: 2,638

El Rosario (Spanish pronunciation: [el roˈsaɾjo]) is a municipality in the Carazo department of Nicaragua.

It is unrelated to Nicaragua’s waterfall of the same name, which is located much farther north in the country: specifically, in the Nueva Segovia Department. The El Rosario Waterfall, also called El Rosario Falls, is considered one of Nicaragua’s major landmarks.

This is in contrast to the town El Rosario. With just over 5,000 residents, El Rosario is little-known outside of Carazo.
