= Santo Domingo, Nicaragua =

Santo Domingo
- Municipality
- Location in Nicaragua
- Coordinates: 12°15′N 85°4′W
- Country: Nicaragua
- Department: Chontales Department

Area
  - Total: 263.2 sq mi (681.7 km^{2})

Population (2023 estimate)
  - Total: 14,460
  - Density: 54.94/sq mi (21.21/km^{2})

Santo Domingo is a municipality in the Chontales Department of Nicaragua. It occupies an area of 681.7 km^{2} (263.2 sq mi), and as per 2023 estimate, the municipality has a population of 14,460 individuals. It is predominantly known as a mining town, as there are several small gold mines that operate in the region.

== History ==
Archaeological remains and indigenous place names suggest that the original inhabitants of the region were indigenous people of Mayan-Caribbean origin who coexisted with other Chontal groups. The modern settlement of Santo Domingo developed during the mining boom in the 1870s. While the earliest miners were indigenous people, the Mestizos arrived in 1872. The first settlement was established near the Artigua River, and consisted of huts built from straw and wood. Until 1913, Santo Domingo was part of the municipality of La Libertad. On 17 March 1913, it was granted the category of town, and on 17 October 1951, it was officially granted city status.

== Geography ==
Santo Domingo is a municipality in the Chontales Department of Nicaragua. It occupies an area of 681.7 km^{2} (263.2 sq mi). The municipality is bordered by the municipalities of Santo Tomás and San Pedro de Lóvago to the south, El Ayote to the east, and La Libertad to the north and west. It is located 190 km (120 mi) from the Nicaraguan capital of Managua.

The municipality is located in the northeastern part of the department, and extends from the Amerrisque Mountains range towards the plains of the Caribbean coast. The municipality is historically associated with gold mining, and there are several small mines and dredging sites where small-scale miners extract and process gold. One of the municipality’s notable natural landmarks is Peña Blanca, a large white monolith located near the town. The Siquia River is a major water source in the municipality, and serves for recreation and fishing.

== Demographics and economy ==
As per 2023 estimate, Santo Domingo has a population of 14,460 individuals of whom 7,179 were male and 7,281 were female. About 44.6% of the population lived in rural areas, and rest was classified as urban.

The economy of the municipality is based on agriculture and livestock rearing. Major agricultural produce include maize, beans, sorghum, and fruits like mangoes and citrus fruits. The livestock rearing dates back to centuries, with several old large ranches.
