= San Juan de Oriente =

Nicaraguan municipality

- Municipality
- Location in Nicaragua
- Coordinates: 11°54′N 86°04′W
- Country: Nicaragua
- Department: Masaya

Area
  - Municipality: 5.3 sq mi (13.8 km^{2})

Population (2020)
  - Municipality: 8,261
  - Density: 1,550/sq mi (599/km^{2})
  - Urban: 4,474
- Climate: Aw

San Juan de Oriente is a municipality in the Masaya department of Nicaragua.
