= San Sebastián de Yalí =

- Municipality
- Location in Nicaragua
- Coordinates: 13°18′N 86°11′W
- Country: Nicaragua
- Department: Jinotega

Area
  - Municipality: 155 sq mi (401 km^{2})

Population (2017)
  - Municipality: 35.549
  - Density: 0.230/sq mi (0.0887/km^{2})
  - Urban: 6.735
- Climate: Aw

San Sebastián de Yalí is a municipality in the Jinotega department of Nicaragua.
