= Tisma, Nicaragua =

Nicaraguan municipality

Tisma
- Municipality
- Location in Nicaragua
- Coordinates: 12°05′N 86°01′W
- Country: Nicaragua
- Department: Masaya

Area
  - Municipality: 49 sq mi (126 km^{2})

Population (2020)
  - Municipality: 12,387
  - Density: 255/sq mi (98.3/km^{2})
  - Urban: 4,720

Tisma is a municipality in the Masaya department of Nicaragua.
