= South Caribbean Coast Autonomous Regional Council =

Autonomous Regional Council

- 8th Regional Council

Type
- Type: Unicameral
- Established: 4 May 1990

Leadership
- President of the Regional Council: Shaira Natasha Downs Morgan since 4 May 2019
- Vice president of the Regional Council: Lorenzo Quinto Gómez

Structure
- Seats: 45
- Assembly political groups: Government: FSLN (34); Opposition parties: PLC (9); YATAMA (2)

Elections
- Assembly voting system: Party-list proportional representation
- Last Assembly election: 2019
- Next Assembly election: 2024

Meeting place
- Government House in Bluefields

The South Caribbean Coast Autonomous Regional Council is the devolved legislature of the South Caribbean Coast Autonomous Region. It has the power to legislate on a wide variety of economic, social, and cultural issues not reserved to the central government. The council has the same power as the North Caribbean Coast Autonomous Regional Council.

== History ==
Autonomy is framed in the recognition of the historical rights of indigenous peoples, Afro-descendants and ethnic communities of the Caribbean Coast that were legally constituted in 1987 in the statutes of Law 28 of Autonomy.

As of the approval of Law 28 in October 1987, the Autonomous Regions began a process of creation, strengthening and development of the autonomous institutions.

Its first advances occurred with the formation of the Autonomous Governments in both Regions, through five electoral processes (1990, 1994, 1998, 2002, 2006, 2010, 2014 and 2019). In this process of regional elections, three representatives are elected from fifteen different electoral districts of each of the regions, for a total of 45 Councilors, Councilors and two Regional Deputies and Deputies in each Autonomous Region.

The Communities of the Caribbean Coast are an indissoluble part of the unitary and indivisible State of Nicaragua and its inhabitants enjoy all the rights and duties that correspond to them as Nicaraguans in accordance with the Political Constitution of the Republic.

The Autonomous Regional Councils of the Caribbean Coast represent the fundamental bodies of the Autonomous institutional framework and are political and administrative structures created to guarantee multiethnic representation since the first autonomous regional elections were held in May 1990.

The legal order of the Autonomy regime of the Caribbean Coast is based on the Political Constitution, the Statute of Autonomy and its Regulations, the Law of Special Regime of Indigenous Communal Lands, as well as other secondary legislation approved in the last ten years. The Regional Councils are made up of forty-five members belonging to the different ethnic groups present in the Regions, and are elected by universal, free and direct vote by the people.

On January 10, 2007, in Nicaragua, a new Model for the well-being of the population began; the Christian, Socialist and Solidarity Model, which puts people, families and communities at the center of public action. The fundamental objective of this Model is to carry out economic, social, and political transformations with the leading role of all Nicaraguans and especially those population groups who have historically been denied their rights, such as women, young people, girls, boys and adolescents. , the elderly, the disabled and Native and Afro-descendant peoples and ethnic communities.

== Current list of Regional Deputies and Councilors ==
Rank	Member	Party	Office term	Committee and leadership positions
-	Arturo Valdez Robleto	FSLN	2019 - 2024	Regional Deputy
-	Paul Gonzalez Tenorio	PLC	2019 - 2024	Regional Deputy
1	Shaira Natasha Downs Morgan	FSLN	2019 - 2024	President of the Board of Directors
2	Lorenzo Quinto Gomez	FSLN	2019 - 2024	First Vice-President
3	Enrique Molina Ofreciano	YATAMA	2019 - 2024	Second Vice-President
4	Judy Delcy Abraham Omier	FSLN	2019 - 2024	First Secretary Board of Directors
5	Kensy Eolisa Sambola Solis	FSLN	2019 - 2024	Second Secretary Board of Directors
6	Tadeo Fonseca Rios	PLC	2019 - 2024	First Member of the Board of Directors
7	Betty Joan McRea Molinar	FSLN	2019 - 2024	Second Member of the Board of Directors
8	Ramona del Socorro Solano González	FSLN	2019 - 2024	FSLN Bank Chief
9	Maria Magdalena Herrera Hernandez	PLC	2019 - 2024	Head of PLC Bench
10	Maximo Martinez Reyes	FSLN	2019 - 2024	President of the Ethics and Discipline Commission
11	Yadira Esperanza Flores	PLC	2019 - 2024	President of the Regional Heritage Commission
12	Enyel Antonio Velasquez Cerda	PLC	2019 - 2024	Chairman of the Agrarian Affairs Commission
13	Cristina Morris Anisal	YATAMA	2019 - 2024	Chairman of the Ethnic Affairs Commission
14	Adan Giovanni Bojorge Espinoza	FSLN	2019 - 2024	Chairman of the Governance and Defense Commission
15	Effie Susana Fox Cuthbert	FSLN	2019 - 2024	President of the Health and Social Welfare Commission
16	Sofia del Rosario Soza Fuentes	FSLN	2019 - 2024	President of the Education and Communication Commission
17	Dennis Gregorio Cruz Pineda	FSLN	2019 - 2024	President of the Labor Affairs Commission
18	Linstron James Abraham	FSLN	2019 - 2024	President of the Community Demarcation
19	Oscar Wendelyn Vargas Chavarria	FSLN	2019 - 2024	President of the Transport and Infrastructure Commission
20	Yesica Lorena St.clair Rámirez	FSLN	2019 - 2024	President of the Anti-Drug Commission
21	Vilma Maria Zamora Guillen	FSLN	2019 - 2024	President of the Regional Heritage Commission
22	Alba Argentina Vargas Mairena	FSLN	2019 - 2024	President of the Commission on Women, Children and Adolescents
23	Randolph Roy Brown Brooks	FSLN	2019 - 2024	President of the Autonomy Commission
24	Reynaldo Humberto Zapata Espinoza	FSLN	2019 - 2024	President of the Sports Commission
25	Ruben Lopez Espinoza	FSLN	2019 - 2024	Regional Government Coordinator
26	Errol Anthony Hodgson Cash	FSLN	2019 - 2024	President of the Economic Affairs Committee
27	Annete Eloise Gordon Mc. Field	FSLN	2019 - 2024	Regional Councilor
28	Esmirna Esmeralda Calero Rodas	PLC	2019 - 2024	Regional Councilor
29	Valentina Elizabeth Lopez Gónzales	FSLN	2019 - 2024	Regional Councilor
30	Pablo Santos Avendaño Zapata	PLC	2019 - 2024	Regional Councilor
31	Jose Alejandro Garcia Guadiel	FSLN	2019 - 2024	Regional Councilor
32	Rosa Maria Allen Fox	FSLN	2019 - 2024	Regional Councilor
33	Constantine Franklin Humphreys	FSLN	2019 - 2024	Regional Councilor
34	Delvin Melvin Prudo Robinson	FSLN	2019 - 2024	Regional Councilor
35	Carmela Susanie Gonzales Humphreys	PLC	2019 - 2024	Regional Councilor
36	Abel Antonio Garcia Rivas	FSLN	2019 - 2024	Regional Councilor
37	Jose de la Cruz Reyes Luna	FSLN	2019 - 2024	Regional Councilor
38	Esther Hernandez Barrera	FSLN	2019 - 2024	Regional Councilor
39	Carlos Manuel Reyes Valle	PLC	2019 - 2024	Regional Councilor
40	Brigida del Pilar Blanco Trails	PLC	2019 - 2024	Regional Councilor
41	Nicolas del Socorro Zamoran Cubas	PLC	2019 - 2024	Regional Councilor
42	Nelson Jesus Garay Blandon	FSLN	2019 - 2024	Regional Councilor
43	Lourdes del Carmen Mejia Salon	FSLN	2019 - 2024	Regional Councilor
44	Jose Miguel Valdez Arias	FSLN	2019 - 2024	Regional Councilor
45	Rosaura Ordoñes Zamora	FSLN	2019 - 2024	Regional Councilor
