= Matiguás =

- Municipality
- Location in Nicaragua
- Coordinates: 12°50′N 85°28′W
- Country: Nicaragua
- Department: Matagalpa

Area
  - Municipality: 592 sq mi (1,532 km^{2})

Population (2022 estimate)
  - Municipality: 54,279
  - Density: 91.76/sq mi (35.43/km^{2})
  - Urban: 16,465
- Climate: Aw

Matiguás (Spanish pronunciation: [matiˈɣwas]) is a town and a municipality in the Matagalpa department of Nicaragua. It is also the twin city of Saarlouis in Germany. It is located 249 kilometres from Managua, and 75 kilometres from Matagalpa City, the department capital.

It was established as a town in 1920, and was promoted to the category of city in 1999. It is the largest municipality of the department, and it is also one of the top milk producing regions in the country, along with the municipalities of Muy Muy, Río Blanco, and Paiwas.

In the Sumo language, "Matiguás" is translated as "water mouse."

== Climate ==
Climate data for Matiguás (1971–1990)
Month	Jan	Feb	Mar	Apr	May	Jun	Jul	Aug	Sep	Oct	Nov	Dec	Year
Mean daily maximum °C (°F)	28.0 (82.4)	29.2 (84.6)	31.2 (88.2)	32.6 (90.7)	32.7 (90.9)	29.7 (85.5)	29.0 (84.2)	29.5 (85.1)	30.1 (86.2)	29.8 (85.6)	29.3 (84.7)	29.0 (84.2)	30.0 (86.0)
Daily mean °C (°F)	23.5 (74.3)	23.9 (75.0)	25.4 (77.7)	26.5 (79.7)	27.1 (80.8)	25.5 (77.9)	25.0 (77.0)	25.1 (77.2)	25.3 (77.5)	25.2 (77.4)	24.6 (76.3)	24.1 (75.4)	25.1 (77.2)
Mean daily minimum °C (°F)	18.8 (65.8)	18.6 (65.5)	19.5 (67.1)	20.7 (69.3)	21.6 (70.9)	21.2 (70.2)	20.9 (69.6)	20.6 (69.1)	20.6 (69.1)	20.4 (68.7)	19.9 (67.8)	19.1 (66.4)	20.2 (68.4)
Average precipitation mm (inches)	42 (1.7)	18 (0.7)	8 (0.3)	19 (0.7)	109 (4.3)	226 (8.9)	239 (9.4)	203 (8.0)	189 (7.4)	166 (6.5)	80 (3.1)	56 (2.2)	1,355 (53.3)
Source: National Oceanic and Atmospheric Administration
