= Chontales Department =

Department of Nicaragua

Coordinates: 12°05′N 85°24′W

Chontales
- Department
- Country: Nicaragua
- Capital: Juigalpa

Area
  - Department: 6,481 km^{2} (2,502 sq mi)

Population (2021 estimate)
  - Department: 191,856
  - Density: 29.60/km^{2} (76.67/sq mi)
  - Urban: 118,625
- ISO 3166-2: NI-CO

Chontales (Spanish: Departamento de Chontales) (Spanish pronunciation: [tʃonˈtales]) is a department in Nicaragua. It covers an area of 6,481 km^{2} (2,502 sq mi) and has a population of 191,856. The capital is Juigalpa. Some 90 kilometres (56 mi) of land overlooks Lake Cocibolca (Lake Nicaragua) on the western side. The department is livestock and fishing based, and is also a producer of apples.

== Geography ==
The Chontales Department is situated in the central-southwest part of the country. It is bordered by the Boaco Department to the north, the Río San Juan Department to the south, the South Caribbean Coast Autonomous Region to the east and Lake Cocibolca to the west. Chontales geographically primarily consists of the slopes around Lake Cocibolca, the Serranía Chontaleña range and rolling hills that undulate towards the Caribbean plain. The Cuisalá, a tributary of the Mayales flows in the northwestern part of the department. The shoreline of Lake Cocibolca within the department is about 90 kilometres (56 mi), between the mouths of the Tecolostote and Oyate rivers.

=== Municipalities ===
The department is divided administratively into 10 municipalities:

1. Acoyapa
2. Comalapa
3. El Coral
4. Juigalpa
5. La Libertad
6. San Francisco de Cuapa
7. San Pedro de Lóvago
8. Santo Domingo
9. Santo Tomás
10. Villa Sandino

== Economy ==
The regional economy of Chontales is mainly based around livestock. The estates along the shore of the lake and along the road to Rama contain many plains and wet pastures to accommodate for cattle herds. The department is also a major producer of apples, producing over 743,000 apples according to one census, representing 8% of all agricultural land in Nicaragua. Mining and fishing are also conducted in the department.

== Landmarks ==
The department contains the Arqueológico Gregorio Aguilar Barea, which has a number of indigenous artifacts attesting to the socio-cultural development of the people of Chontales throughout history. The Museo Comunitario Juigalpan María Ramos in Juigalpa reveals much about the history and identity of the region. The Reserva Natural de Amerrique is a nature reserve within the department, in a volcanic area.
