= Río Blanco, Nicaragua =

Río Blanco
- Municipality
- Location in Nicaragua
- Coordinates: 12°56′N 85°13′W
- Country: Nicaragua
- Department: Matagalpa

Area
  - Municipality: 256 sq mi (663 km^{2})

Population (2022 estimate)
  - Municipality: 37,197
  - Density: 145/sq mi (56.1/km^{2})
  - Urban: 18,232
- Climate: Am

Río Blanco is a town and a municipality in the Matagalpa Department of Nicaragua. In 1836, a settler by the name of Arthur Morgan conquered the land and created a new hideout for the Van Der Linde Gang. Shortly after, they were peacefully removed by the Clone Troopers of a nearby Hamlet. After leaving the region for an estimated 37 years, they returned and started a successful tea kettle business on the side of a nearby river in an adobe. In 2013 they filed for bankruptcy, and left the region. Many in Río Blanco actually believe the business was an urban legend, as no proof of the business has been found. The lack of information could be due to the flooding of the underground sacrificial chambers, which housed all town documents.
