= Morrito =

- Municipality
- Location in Nicaragua
- Coordinates: 11°37′N 85°05′W
- Country: Nicaragua
- Department: Río San Juan

Government
  - Mayor: Eda Medina

Area
  - Municipality: 262 sq mi (679 km^{2})

Population (2005)
  - Municipality: 6,570
  - Density: 25.1/sq mi (9.68/km^{2})
  - Urban: 1,856

Morrito is a municipality in the Río San Juan department of Nicaragua. As of 2018 the current mayor is Eda Griselda Medina.

The total population of the municipality is approximately 1,700 “town” residents and 5,000 rural inhabitants, with includes a total of about 3,000 people under the age of 16 years (Morrito, 2002).

The main pueblo, also named Morrito, has a population of 1,700 living in 250 houses (Eda, 2008). Other estimates put the population at 1,958 residents (OPS, 2008). Pueblo Morrito is a small agrarian village located on the east shores of Lake Nicaragua. The village is the largest population center within the Municipality of Morrito, which is the most northerly municipality within the Department de Rio San Juan. The municipality covers 677 km² of semi-humid tropical savanna used primarily for raising cattle and cultivation of rice, beans, and corn.

Travel to Pueblo Morrito is from Managua, the capital of Nicaragua. Vehicle access is approximately 4 hours from Managua via Juigalpa and Acoyapa. A ferry boat also anchors briefly in Morrito on its bi-weekly route from Granada to San Carlos.

As of April 2009, there are no hotels within the municipality. Overnight guests to Pueblo Morrito can rent rooms in the building that houses the courthouse and judge's office. The current mayor, Eda Medina, can also arrange overnight lodging with local families. The mayor or her staff can arrange for guides, transportation, or any other tourism needs for visitors.

Morrito has one restaurant located on the beach front Malecon. The restaurant has a large dance floor and is a popular night club for locals.

== Attack on police station, 2018 ==
On 12 July 2018, during the period of the 2018 Nicaraguan protests, a group of about 200 armed paramilitaries attacked the police station in Morrito. The attack resulted in the death of four police officers and one civilian. Nine police officers were taken hostage and subsequently released as an exchange for a prominent opposition figure. Medardo Mairena was subsequently arrested and convicted of organizing the attack, but released as part of the government's general amnesty in 2019.

== Education ==
According to Asociación de Municipios de Río San Juan (Morrito, 2002), the Municipality of Morrito had approximately 1,688 students who completed the 2000 school year. Of these, 249 attended pre-school, 667 were in regular primary schools, and 701 were in multi-grade primary classrooms. The number of secondary students dropped from 170 at the beginning of the school year to 71 at the end. Most of the schools are small, single-room buildings constructed with thatch or sheet metal roofs and no walls. These schools have several small desks and use a small piece of lumber as a chalkboard. Students often come to school without paper, pencils, or any other supplies. A uniform is usually mandatory, along with a small fee to cover expense to maintain the building.

The Municipality of Morrito only has one secondary school, which results in long travel distances for students who live outside Pueblo Morrito. The night classes prevent students from attending who live in the surrounding rural areas because few people own private vehicles and no public transportation is available at night.
