= Pearl Lagoon =

Municipality in Mosquitia

- Municipality
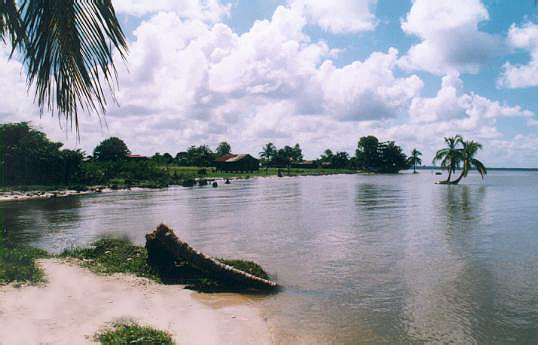
- Beach in Pearl Lagoon

- Coat of arms
- Interactive map of Pearl Lagoon
- Coordinates: 12°21′N 83°40′W
- Country: Nicaragua
- Department: South Caribbean Coast Autonomous Region
- Seat: Pearl City

Government
  - Mayor: Dariel Taylor (FSLN)

Area
  - Municipality: 1,963.43 km^{2} (758.08 sq mi)

Population (2023 estimate)
  - Municipality: 22,192
  - Density: 11.303/km^{2} (29.274/sq mi)
  - Urban: 11,638

Pearl Lagoon is a municipality located in the South Caribbean Coast Autonomous Region of Nicaragua. It is named after the Pearl Cay Lagoon, a prominent coastal lagoon within its territory. As of 2022, Pearl Lagoon Municipality had a population of 21,360.

== History ==
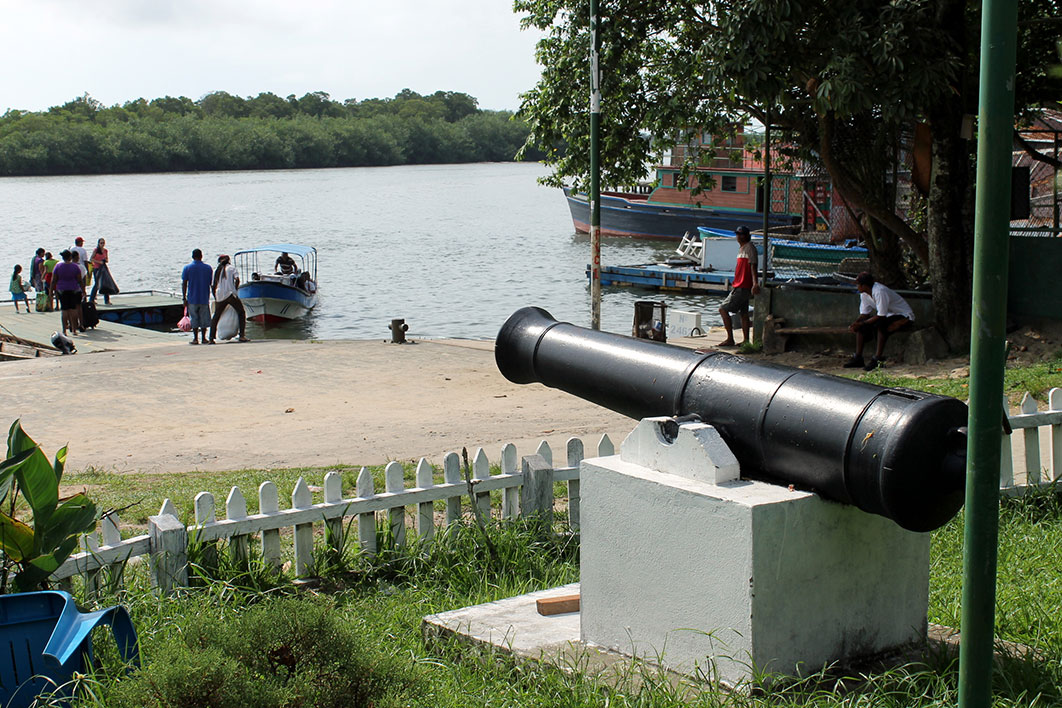
18th century cannon at the Municipal Wharf of Pearl Lagoon

Pearl Lagoon, along with the eastern half of present-day Nicaragua, was a British protectorate from 1655 until 1860, a period when the region was called the Mosquito Coast.

In the period before 1894, eastern Nicaragua was a British protectorate, ruled through a line of Miskito kings. About a century ago, Pearl Lagoon was considered to be the second capital of the Moskitian Kingdom when the last Miskito King took up residence in the town of Pearl City, the capital of the municipality.

At that time, Pearl Lagoon was called "the Granada of the Mosquitia" by one of the conquistadores of the Pacific Coast because of its beauty and the booming ship traffic.

An 18th-century cannon situated on the municipality wharf of Pearl Lagoon has an inscription commemorating battles between liberal and conservative factions. The cannon was never fired in anger, it was used only for celebrations.

== Culture ==
Most of the inhabitants are Creole, but a large number of Miskito, Mestizo and some Garifuna are also present. The Mestizo people started migrating in the late 90s, some from the city of El Rama and some from the northern part of the municipality of Pearl Lagoon.

May Pole is an important cultural celebration in Pearl Lagoon, as in Bluefields, is observed during May. The event brings together residents from across the municipality and includes expressions of local cultural traditions.

The main communities are Haulover, Kakabila, Marshall Point, Pearl Lagoon, Orinoco, La Fe, Raitipura, Brown Bank, Tasbapauni, Set Net Point, Wawashan, San Vicente, Awas and Pedregal.

== Sports ==
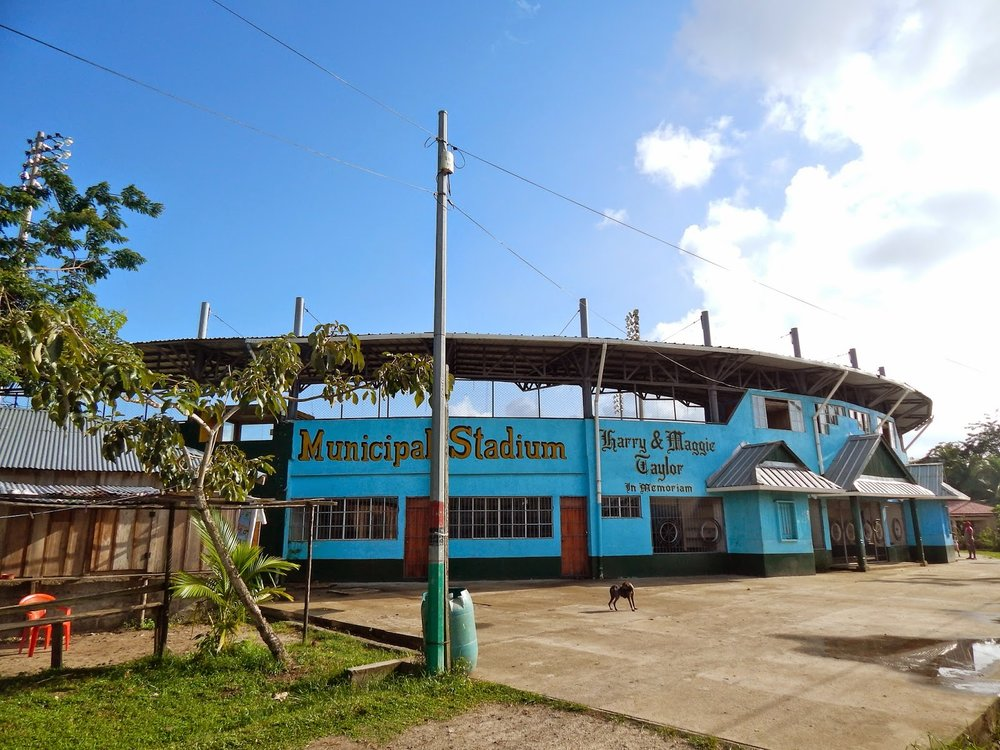
Harry and Maggie Taylor Municipal Stadium

Pearl Lagoon was the home to four local baseball teams that played during the dry seasons on Sundays. The four teams were: Sweet Pearly, First Stop, The Young Brave, and the Haulover Tigers.

Although those teams no longer exist, baseball is still one of the main sports in the community which is also played in the dry season on Sundays at the Harry and Maggie Taylor municipal stadium.

== Transportation ==
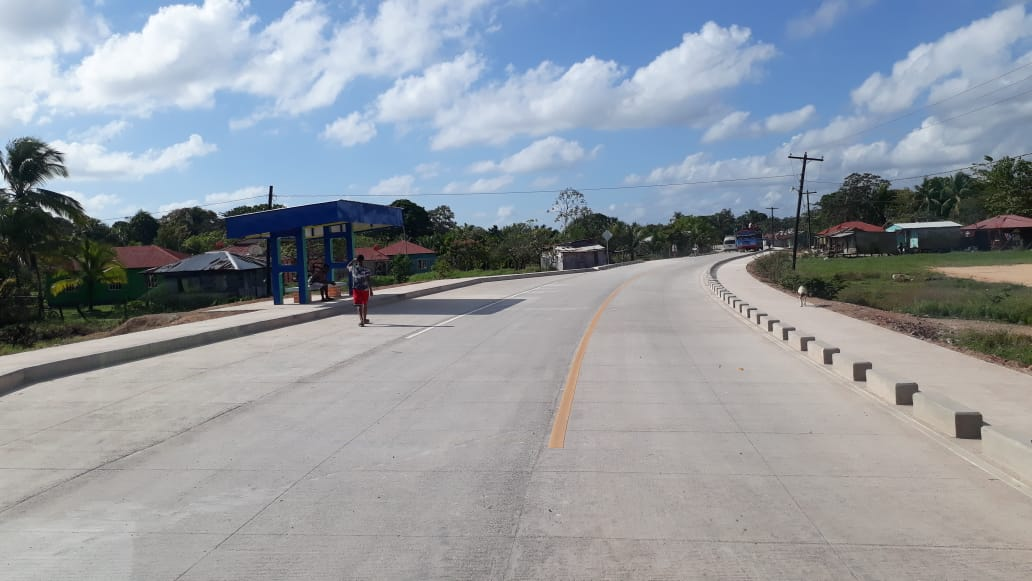
Highway between Pearl Lagoon and Haulover

The municipality of Pearl Lagoon is located just north of Bluefields, the capital of the South Caribbean Coast Autonomous Region, and can be reach by boat and Panga boat.

In 2006, the IDR initiated the construction of a new rural road of 17 km from Kukra Hill to Pearl Lagoon. The road is now reconstructed and as of today, it permits direct access to Managua from Pearl Lagoon and was financed by the World Bank (WB) through the International Development Association (IDA). Pearl Lagoon is connected by bus services to Kukra Hill and Managua.

== Education ==
In Pearl Lagoon, there are three schools. The Beulah Light Burn school which is only for primary and pre-escolar students, the Pearl Lagoon National Institute only for Secondary students and the Pearl Lagoon Academy of Excellence (PLACE) for pre-escolar, primary and secondary students.

== See also ==
- Municipalities of Nicaragua
