= Villa Sandino =

- Municipality
- Location in Nicaragua
- Coordinates: 12°03′N 84°59′W
- Country: Nicaragua
- Department: Chontales Department

Area
  - Total: 261.2 sq mi (676.5 km^{2})

Population (2023)
  - Total: 15,189
  - Density: 58.15/sq mi (22.45/km^{2})

Villa Sandino is a municipality in the Chontales Department of Nicaragua. It occupies an area of 676.5 km^{2} (261.2 sq mi), and as per 2023 estimate, the municipality has a population of 15,189 individuals. The municipality was officially created as Villa Somoza on 27 August 1942, and was renamed as Villa Sandino in 1979.

== History ==
The origin of the town dates back to 1886 when immigrants from other parts of Nicaragua came in search of land suitable for setting up cattle ranches and settled in the region. These settlers established the village of Pueblo Viejo along the route connecting Chontales with El Rama and Muelle de los Bueyes. Don Dionisio Dávila is regarded as the founder of the settlement. Economic activities such as cattle ranching, timber logging, and raicilla and rubber extraction contributed to the economic growth of the area, and the construction of the road to El Rama encouraged further migration and settlement. As the population expanded, local authorities petitioned the national government to elevate the settlement to municipal status. The municipality was officially created under the name Villa Somoza by an official decree issued on 27 August 1942. Following the Nicaraguan Revolution in 1979, the municipality was renamed as Villa Sandino.

== Geography ==
Villa Sandino is a municipality in the Chontales Department of Nicaragua. It occupies an area of 676.5 km^{2} (261.2 sq mi). The municipality is bordered by the municipalities of Santo Tomás and Muelle de los Bueyes to the east, Acoyapa to the south, and Santo Tomás to the north and Santo Tomás and Acoyapa to the west. It is located 191 km (119 mi) from the Nicaraguan capital of Managua.

Villa Sandino is located in the southeastern part of the department. The municipality contains several hills and elevated areas. The Mico River crosses the territory and forms a number of pools and recreation areas. It later joins the Rama and Siquia rivers to form the Escondido River.

== Demographics and economy ==
As per 2023 estimate, Villa Sandino has a population of 15,189 individuals of whom 7,536 were male and 7,653 were female. About 55.7% of the population lived in urban areas, and rest of the population was classified as rural.

The economy of the municipality is based on livestock rearing. Limited agriculture is practiced and agricultural produce include food grains, bananas, and tubers.
