= South Caribbean Coast Autonomous Region =

Autonomous region of Nicaragua

South Caribbean Coast Autonomous Region Región Autónoma de la Costa Caribe Sur (Spanish)
- Autonomous region
- Flag Coat of arms
- Anthem: Coast Brothers
- Country: Nicaragua
- Capital: Bluefields
- Largest city: Nueva Guinea
- Municipalities: List: Bluefields; Corn Islands; Desembocadura de Río Grande; El Ayote; El Tortuguero; Kukra Hill; La Cruz de Río Grande; Muelle de los Bueyes; Nueva Guinea; Paiwas; Pearl Lagoon; Rama

Government
  - Type: Unicameral
  - Body: Regional Council
  - Regional Coordinator (Governor): Rubén López Espinoza (FSLN)

Area
  - Total: 27,260 km^{2} (10,530 sq mi)
  - Rank: 2nd (20.9% of Nicaragua)

Population (2021 estimate)
  - Total: 420,935
  - Density: 15.44/km^{2} (39.99/sq mi)

GDP (Nominal, 2015 US dollar)
  - Total: $500 million (2023)
  - Per capita: $1,000 (2023)

GDP (PPP, 2015 int. dollar)
  - Total: $1.2 billion (2023)
  - Per capita: $2,700 (2023)
- ISO 3166 code: NI-AS
- Autonomy Statute: 30 October 1987
- Official languages: Spanish; Creole (Moskitian Creole and Rama Cay Creole); Miskito; Sumo (Mayangna and Ulwa); Rama; Garifuna
- Regional Council: 45 councilors
- National Assembly: 2 deputies (of 92)

Street in Bluefields, South Caribbean Coast

The South Caribbean Coast Autonomous Region (Note: Spanish: Región Autónoma de la Costa Caribe Sur; abbr.: RACCS and previously known as the South Atlantic Autonomous Region (Spanish: Región Autónoma del Atlántico Sur), RAAS) is one of two autonomous regions in Nicaragua. It was created along with the North Caribbean Coast Autonomous Region by the Autonomy Statute of 7 September 1987 through a division of the former Zelaya Department. It covers an area of 27,260 km^{2} (10,530 sq mi) and has a population of 420,935 (2021 estimate). The capital is Bluefields. Bordering the Caribbean Sea, it contains part of the region known as Moskitia.

Eight languages are spoken in the region, with English Creole and Spanish being dominant. The regional official languages are: Spanish (national official language of Nicaragua), Creole (Moskitian Creole and Rama Cay Creole), Sumo (Mayangna and Ulwa), Rama, Miskito, and Garifuna.

The Pearl Cays archipelago is also a part of the South Caribbean Coast Autonomous Region but mainly belonging to the municipality of Pearl Lagoon.

== Municipalities ==
It is divided into 12 municipalities:

1. Bluefields
2. Corn Islands
3. Desembocadura de Río Grande
4. El Ayote
5. El Tortuguero
6. Kukra Hill
7. La Cruz de Río Grande
8. Muelle de los Bueyes
9. Nueva Guinea
10. Paiwas
11. Pearl Lagoon
12. El Rama

== Economy ==
=== Agriculture ===
Approximately 30 percent of the Caribbean Coast’s labor force forms part of the agriculture industry.

According to the IV National Agricultural Census prepared by the National Development Information Institute (INIDE) and, the Ministry of Agriculture and Forestry (MAGFOR), products with greater production potential in the Caribbean Coast are: oil palm, coconut, pineapple, sesame seeds, irrigated rice, rainfed rice, onion cultivation, chia, chilli pepper, red bean of apante, premium red bean, premium black bean, corn, malanga, quequisque, cassava, dry land banana, sugar cane, higuerilla, cacao and robusta coffee.

=== Fishing ===
The fishery sector represents the third activity in terms of importance of incomes generation to the country. Historically the fishery has been concentrated in shrimp, lobster and some species of fishes. In 2016, the Caribbean Coast contributed to the national production of fishery and aquiculture with 24 million of pounds, and exported 76 percent with a value of US$126 million.

=== Mining ===
Mining has a tradition of more than one hundred years in the Northern and Southern Caribbean Coast Autonomous Regions. Although its participation in the international market has been modest due to historical factors, the mining sector has been growing since 2010, exporting 357 million dollars in 2016. Around 380 hectares in the North Caribbean Coast Autonomous Region have been awarded under metallic and non-metallic mining concessions, most of which are located in the municipalities of Rosita, Bonanza and Siuna. 220 hectares are currently being exploited.

=== Livestock, dairy and meat production ===
The Caribbean Coast represents 35 percent of the Nicaragua cattle industry. With an annual compound growth rate of 9 percent in meat exports and 11 percent per year in milk production over the past 8 years, Nicaragua maintains its position as the main livestock, dairy products and meat producer of the Central American region.

=== Forestry ===
The region represents an estimate of 37,394 km^{2} of land with potential for timber production of high commercial value such as mahogany, laurel, and teak. Since 2003, there has been an increase of commercially valuable timber plantations such as teak and mahogany. In 2014-2020, investments in the forestry sector in the region has been over US$100 million.

== Infrastructure ==
Currently, around 300 km of roads are maintained. Rural roads measure approx. 2,415 kilometers of rural roads. There are 157 vehicular and pedestrian bridges.

=== Ports and airports ===
The South Caribbean Coast Autonomous Region has one port for commercial use: The Bluff. The Bluff is located on the Bluefields Bay, 6 nautical miles offshore and about 98 miles north of Costa Rica. This port is only accessible by water. The navigation route that connects The Bluff with Rama is approximately 100 kilometers along Escondido River, which has been marked with navigation buoys. The port offers services to guide ships through the Escondido River and all the way to the Rama port.

=== Electric energy ===
As of 2016, 52 percent of the South Caribbean Coast Autonomous Region had direct access to the national electricity power grid and enjoyed an uninterrupted power supply. This represents approximately 313 communities in both regions, where about US$30 million have been invested to continue improving the quality and coverage of the energy service.

== Transportation ==
=== Air ===
The local airline La Costeña currently provides aerial transportation between Managua and the Caribbean Coast. It currently offers daily flights to Puerto Cabezas, Bluefields, Corn Island, Siuna, Bonanza, Río San Juan and Waspam. Likewise, the Caribbean Coast has three main cargo terminals located in Puerto Cabezas (Bilwi), Bluefields and Corn Island. All Airports are administered by EAAI.

== See also ==
- North Caribbean Coast Autonomous Region
