= Escondido River (Nicaragua) =

River in Nicaragua

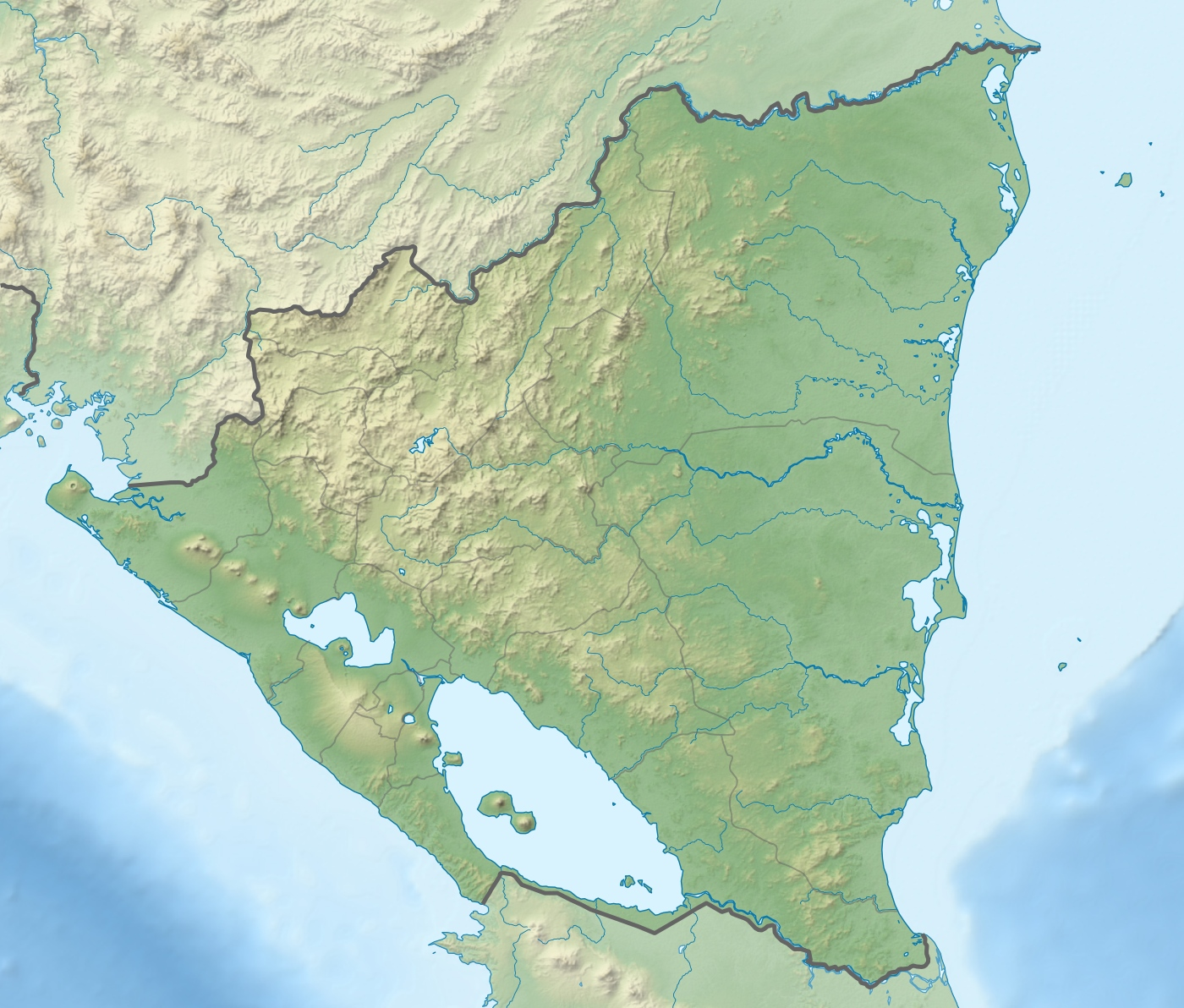
- Location of mouth

Location
- Country: Nicaragua

Physical characteristics
- Mouth
  - location: Bluefields, Caribbean Sea
  - coordinates: 12.0868°N 83.7492°W
  - elevation: 0 m (0 ft)
- Length: 89 km (55 mi)

Escondido (Spanish: Río Escondido) is a river in southeastern Nicaragua. It is 89 kilometres (55 mi) long and it empties into the Caribbean Sea near Bluefields in the South Caribbean Coast Autonomous Region.

It provides a major transportation route between the Pacific and Caribbean coasts.

Its tributaries are:

- Kama River
- Mahogany River
- Rama River
  - Plata River
- Mico River
- Siquia River
