= El Rama =

- Municipality
- Nicaragua in 1984

- Location in Nicaragua
- Coordinates: 12°09′N 84°13′W
- Country: Nicaragua
- Department: South Caribbean Coast Autonomous Region

Area
  - Municipality: 1,449.00 sq mi (3,752.90 km^{2})

Population (2023 estimate)
  - Municipality: 59,209
  - Density: 40.862/sq mi (15.777/km^{2})
  - Urban: 23,939
- Time zone: UTC−06:00 (CST)
- Climate: Am
- Website: Manfut-ElRama

El Rama is a municipality and a city in the South Caribbean Coast Autonomous Region of Nicaragua.

It is located along the Bluefields River which branches off into three other rivers: the Sumi, Rama, and Bluefields. It is home to an important Atlantic / Caribbean port. The municipality has a population of 59,055 (2022 estimate).

== History ==
El Rama is an old settlement, whose name is reminiscent of their first settlers, the Caribbean indigenous Rama, once populate the territories of the present municipalities of Bluefields and El Rama. Unlike the Miskito, this ethnic group did not subordinated to the British and other European nations from 1633. Ethnicity also fought pirates and Spanish conquistadors who sought to enslave during the conquest.

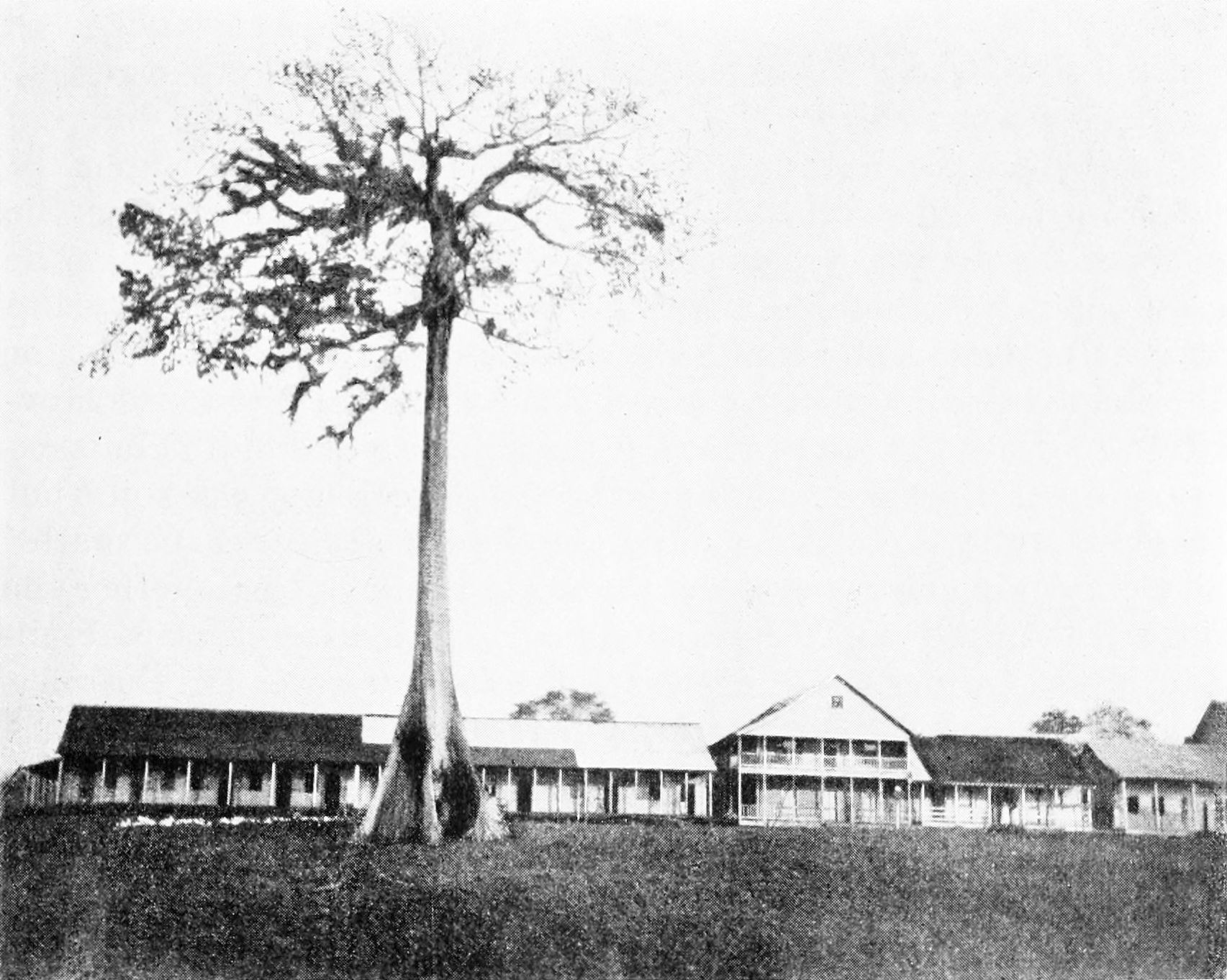
El Rama in 1894

The municipality increased its importance in the late nineteenth century, with the beginning of the extraction of timber, rubber and banana enclave by US companies. This economic activation caused a strong flow from other parts of the country as well as citizens of Chinese origin, who were primarily devoted to trade. The construction of the Managua–El Rama highway facilitated successive waves of migration of peasants

== Settlements ==
There are a total of 98 communities: among which we can to mention:

- La Esperanza: 8 kilometres (5.0 miles) northwest of El Rama, on the highway to Managua, the second in population and importance, with an urban population of 3500 inhabitants .
- Wapi: Located 32 kilometres (20 miles) northwest of El Rama, with an urban population of 2,500 inhabitants, according to a municipal census unfinished houses more than 124.
- Other minor places, but with a tendency to develop as villages, are: El Recreo, El Colorado, El Pavon, Aguas Calientes, Maria Cristina Gaitan, Magnolia, Las Iguanas, El Pedregal, La Union, El Arene, El Castillo and St Geronimo.

== Twin towns – sister cities ==
- Maastricht, Netherlands

== See also ==
- Municipalities of Nicaragua
- Rama people
- Facebook Page
