= Departments of Nicaragua =

Administrative divisions of Nicaragua

Nicaragua has 15 departments

Nicaragua is a unitary republic, divided for administrative purposes into fifteen departments (Spanish: departamentos) and two autonomous regions (Spanish: regiones autónomas).

== Evolution of Nicaragua's territorial organization ==
- 1858-08-19: After gaining its independence, Nicaragua drafted the Constitution of 1858, which established seven departments: Chinandega, Chontales, Granada, León, Matagalpa, Nueva Segovia, and Rivas.
- 1883: Masaya Department created.
- 1891: Carazo Department was created in 1891
- 1891-10-15: Jinotega Department created from Matagalpa Department. Estelí Department created from Nueva Segovia.
- 1894: Mosquito Coast ceded to Nicaragua and the Zelaya Department formed from it.
- 1936-11-11: Madriz Department created from Nueva Segovia Department
- 1938: Boaco Department is formed from a part of Chontales Department
- 1957: Río San Juan Department created from parts of Chontales and Zelaya departments.
- 1987: Zelaya Department divided into North Caribbean Coast Autonomous Region (NCCAR) and South Caribbean Coast Autonomous Region (SCCAR).

== Departments ==
ISO	Map	Department	Capital	Population (2023)	Area (km^{2})	Pop. density (km^{−2})
NI-BO		Boaco	Boaco	188,809	4,176.68	45.21
NI-CA		Carazo	Jinotepe	200,894	1,081.40	185.77
NI-CI		Chinandega	Chinandega	445,784	4,822.42	92.44
NI-CO		Chontales	Juigalpa	193,827	6,481.27	29.91
NI-ES		Estelí	Estelí	233,077	2,229.69	104.53
NI-GR		Granada	Granada	219,244	1,039.68	210.88
NI-JI		Jinotega	Jinotega	499,289	9,222.40	54.14
NI-LE		León	León	426,850	5,138.03	83.08
NI-MD		Madriz	Somoto	181,328	1,708.23	106.15
NI-MN		Managua	Managua	1,585,801	3,465.10	457.65
NI-MS		Masaya	Masaya	409,265	610.78	670.07
NI-MT		Matagalpa	Matagalpa	613,262	6,803.86	90.13
NI-NS		Nueva Segovia	Ocotal	282,800	3,491.28	81.00
NI-RI		Rivas	Rivas	185,514	2,161.82	85.81
NI-SJ		Río San Juan	San Carlos	140,786	7,540.90	18.67

== Autonomous regions ==
In 1987, the new constitution established the Charter of Autonomy (limited self-government) for the former department of Zelaya, comprising the entire eastern half of the country. The department was divided into two autonomous regions (communities): the North Caribbean Coast Autonomous Region and the South Caribbean Coast Autonomous Region. The Charter of Autonomy is largely based on the model used by Spain. The communities are governed by a Governor and a Regional Council.

ISO	Map	Autonomous region	Capital	Population (2023)	Area (km^{2})	Pop. density (km^{−2})
NI-AN		North Caribbean Coast Autonomous Region	Bilwi	563,088	33,105.98	17.01
NI-AS		South Caribbean Coast Autonomous Region	Bluefields	434,270	27,260.02	15.93

== See also ==
- ISO 3166-2:NI

== Notes ==
- Instituto Nicaragüense de Estudios Territoriales (INETER). División Política Administrativa del País. March, 2000.
- Instituto Nicaragüense de Fomento Municipal (INIFOM). Municipios – General.
- International Organization for Standardization (ISO). Codes for the representation of names of countries and their subdivisions. ISO 3166-2:NI.
