= Condega =

- Municipality
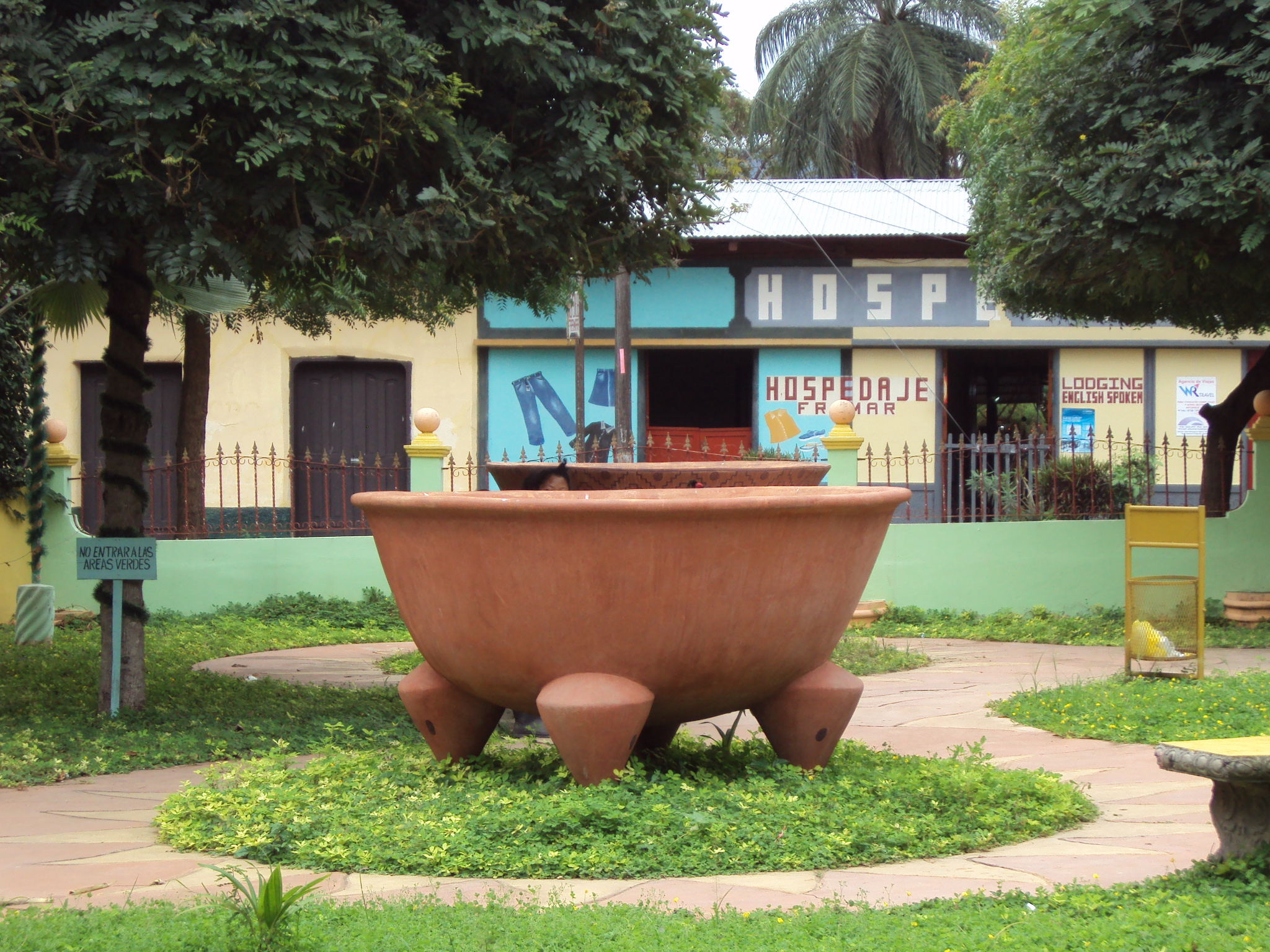
- Municipal park

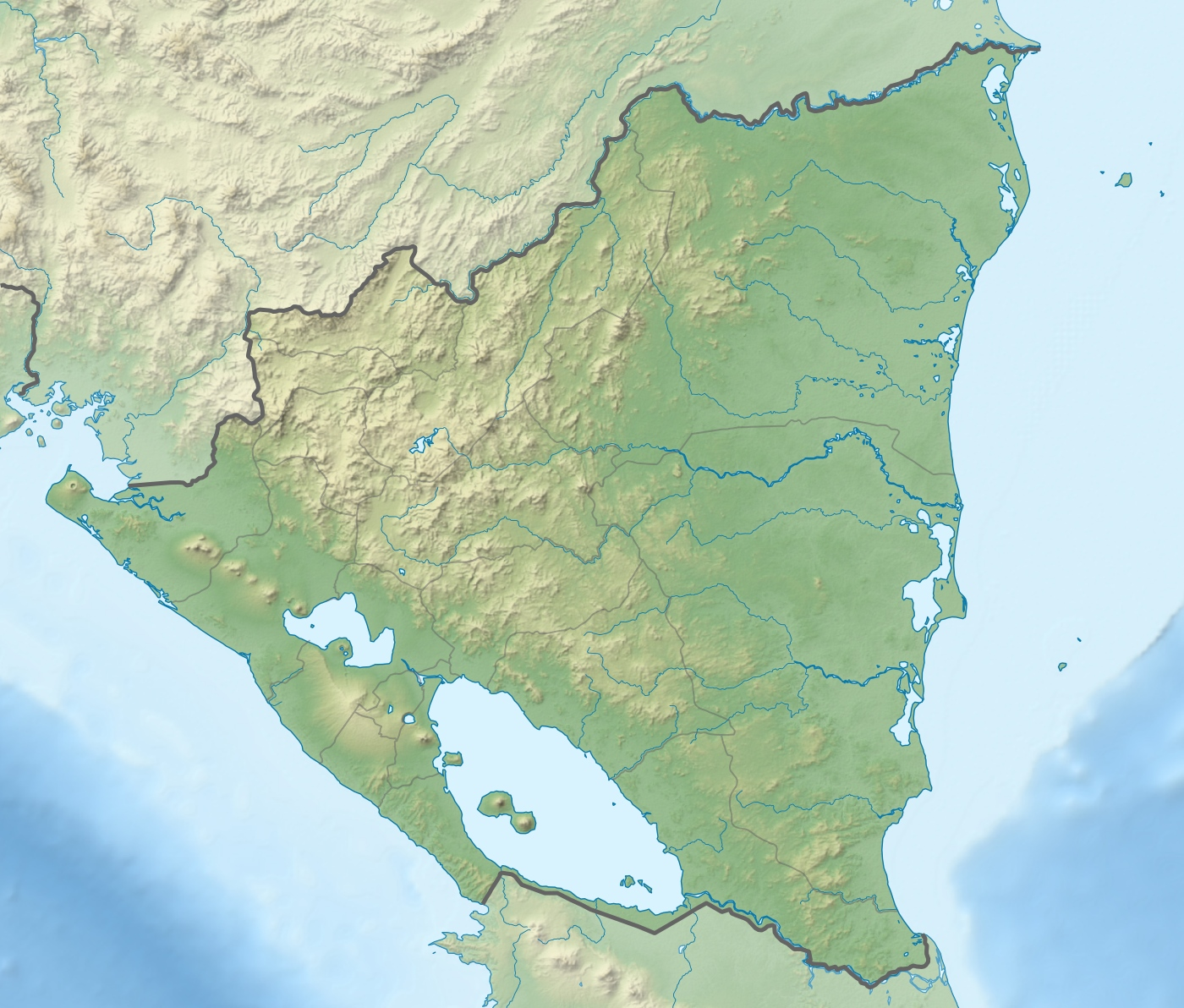
- Location in Nicaragua
- Coordinates: 13°21′N 86°24′W
- Country: Nicaragua
- Department: Estelí Department

Government
  - Mayor: Jairo Arce Avilés

Area
  - Municipality: 143 sq mi (371 km^{2})

Population (2022 estimate)
  - Municipality: 31,257
  - Density: 218/sq mi (84.3/km^{2})
  - Urban: 12,073

Condega (Spanish pronunciation: [konˈdeɣa]) is a municipality in the Estelí department of Nicaragua. It was officially incorporated on June 9, 1962. Condega is situated on the Pan-American Highway (Route One) at a distance of 185 km (115 mi) north of Managua, and at an altitude of 560 m (1,840 ft) above sea level.

== Geographical description ==
The Department of Estelí is located in the north central highlands, where the altitude moderates the climate. The mountain areas are covered with forests of oak and pine.

The municipality of Condega is located in the Department of Estelí, near the Estelí River. Condega is the second largest of six municipalities in the Department of Estelí, second is size only to Estelí.

The municipal center is located 185 km (115 mi) north of Managua (about 3 hours by car). Its territorial size is of 398 km^{2} (154 sq mi), corresponding to the second place among the six municipalities of the Department of Estelí. According to INTER, 4 the municipality of Condega is located at the coordinates 13° 21' north latitude and 86° 23' west longitude.

The municipality of Condega borders to the north with the municipalities of Palacagüina and Telpaneca that belong to the Department of Madriz; to the south with the municipality of Estelí; to the east with the municipalities of San Sebastián de Yalí that belongs to the Department of Jinotega; and to the west with the municipalities of Pueblo Nuevo and San Juan de Limay.

The Ecological Park of Cantagallo is located 22 km (14 mi) away to the east. The park is in the Cantagallo Mountains. A profusion of orchids grow there.

== Topography ==
This municipality has an altitude of 561 meters above sea level (MASL). The Condega area is characterized by a very rugged relief with marked differences in altitude and diversity of terrestrial systems.

It has physiographic slopes that range from steep to extremely steep with tables and small plains, varying its slopes in the plains from mild to strong slopes in the mountains, showing marked differences in altitude, ranging from 550 MASL in the Condega valley up to 1,450 MASL, which includes the micro-regions of El Bramadero, Los Corralitos, and San Jeronimo. The highest elevations are: Cerro El Roble (1,485 MASL), Cerro El Roble (1,470 MASL), Cerro Las Cumbres (1,348 MASL), and El Jilguero Hill (1,345 MASL). The agricultural area of the municipality is characterized by a well-drained alluvial plain that oscillates between 550 and 800 MASL.

== Road system ==
The road system of the municipality is constituted by a total of 156 km of roads of which 11.85% constitutes the primary network, 20.37% the secondary network and 67.78% the tertiary. The road system of the municipality is constituted by a total of 297.15 km of roads, of which 10.43% are the primary network, 4.96% are the secondary network and 4.6% are tertiary. Of the total of roads of the municipality, the 18.35 km of the Pan-American Highway that crosses the municipality of north to the south are included. At the urban level there are 155 blocks, of which 13 are asphalted and 22 paved, for a 29.67% coverage.

== Archeology ==
The site of Condega was inhabited from pre-Hispanic times, as evidenced by the archaeological remains found in the urban area and nearby communities. According to archeologists, these objects are classified in a period between 800 and 1200.

This zone had a great importance of cultural exchange and commercial exchange with other aboriginal populations of the northern zones Ulua-Yojoa, of the present Republic of Honduras, by the found ceramic of the type Ulua Policroma and Babilonio and the molds of mud for emptying of figures.

The type of archaeological pieces include:

Litica: they are objects that were elaborated by means of percussion procedures, giving shape until later the sharpening and polishing of arrow points, lances, blades, axes with flint, chalcedony, jasper, obsidian, etc.

Metates: they were used to grind maize, as seats, throne chairs and for children's games. There are different sizes: medium, large; There are coarse and fine; Without legs, with three or four legs; Round and triangular legs decorated with geometric lines; Simple without decoration and with front decoration with animal head.

Mortars: wooden containers used to crush food and mineral substances, vegetables and animals; To prepare medicines and dyes for ceramics, or to have tissues. There are different sizes and characteristics: round shape, without legs, with legs, globular protuberances and indecisive decoration.

The Museum of Condega (Museo Arqueológico de Condega) has a collection of more than 300 Pre-Columbian artifacts, some dating to 800 years before Christ.

== Demographics ==
The national census of 2005 reported an urban population of 9,894 and a rural population of 18,587 with a total population of 28,481. The census reported 14,307 women and 14,174 men.

The population is largely mestizo.

== Healthcare ==
The Ada María López Primary Hospital opened in 2011 in Condega.

Three hospitals are located in the nearby city of Estelí.

The San Felipe Dental Clinic is available for dental health.

Several pharmacies (farmacias) operate in Condega.

== Education ==
=== Public Schools ===
The Ministry of Education renovated the public school at Santa Teresa in 2013, which serves more than five hundred students on three different educational levels. The Juan Castillo School Center is located on Calle Central.

=== Private and Religious Schools ===
In addition to the public schools, Condega is the site of several Christian schools. Condega is the location of the Instituto Cristiano Denis Cáceras El Reneuvo, a Christian private school, which enjoys support from Addis International Missions of Addis, Louisiana; the Samaritan Mission school; and the Jesus the Potter School, which is supported by the New Sharon United Methodist Church of New Sharon, Iowa.

There also is a school of boxing at Condega.

== Agriculture ==
Tobacco is grown is Condega and cigars are produced. Coffee is also produced in Condega.

== Crafts ==
Reproductions of Pre-Columbian pottery are produced in Condega.

== Media ==
The Good Samaritan Mission Radio Station broadcasts on frequency modulated (FM) 98.9 megahertz.

== Climate ==
Climate data for Condega (1961–1990)
Month	Jan	Feb	Mar	Apr	May	Jun	Jul	Aug	Sep	Oct	Nov	Dec	Year
Mean daily maximum °C (°F)	29.5 (85.1)	30.8 (87.4)	32.7 (90.9)	32.7 (90.9)	32.6 (90.7)	31.2 (88.2)	29.6 (85.3)	30.4 (86.7)	30.4 (86.7)	30.1 (86.2)	29.4 (84.9)	29.3 (84.7)	29.9 (85.8)
Daily mean °C (°F)	21.5 (70.7)	22.3 (72.1)	24.0 (75.2)	25.0 (77.0)	25.1 (77.2)	24.3 (75.7)	23.6 (74.5)	24.0 (75.2)	23.9 (75.0)	23.5 (74.3)	22.5 (72.5)	21.8 (71.2)	23.5 (74.3)
Mean daily minimum °C (°F)	11.2 (52.2)	11.4 (52.5)	12.8 (55.0)	13.9 (57.0)	15.5 (59.9)	16.3 (61.3)	15.5 (59.9)	15.4 (59.7)	15.5 (59.9)	15.0 (59.0)	12.6 (54.7)	10.9 (51.6)	13.8 (56.8)
Average precipitation mm (inches)	7 (0.3)	4 (0.2)	11 (0.4)	21 (0.8)	113 (4.4)	131 (5.2)	81 (3.2)	98 (3.9)	141 (5.6)	127 (5.0)	34 (1.3)	14 (0.6)	782 (30.8)
Average precipitation days (≥ 1.0 mm)	2	1	1	2	8	13	12	12	13	13	6	4	87
Source: NOAA

== International relations ==
=== Twin towns – sister cities ===
Condega is a sister city to two cities in the United States as well as several cities in Europe:

(United States) Bend, Oregon; (United States) Fairfax, California	Ansfelden, Austria; Herford, Germany
