= Yalagüina =

- Municipality
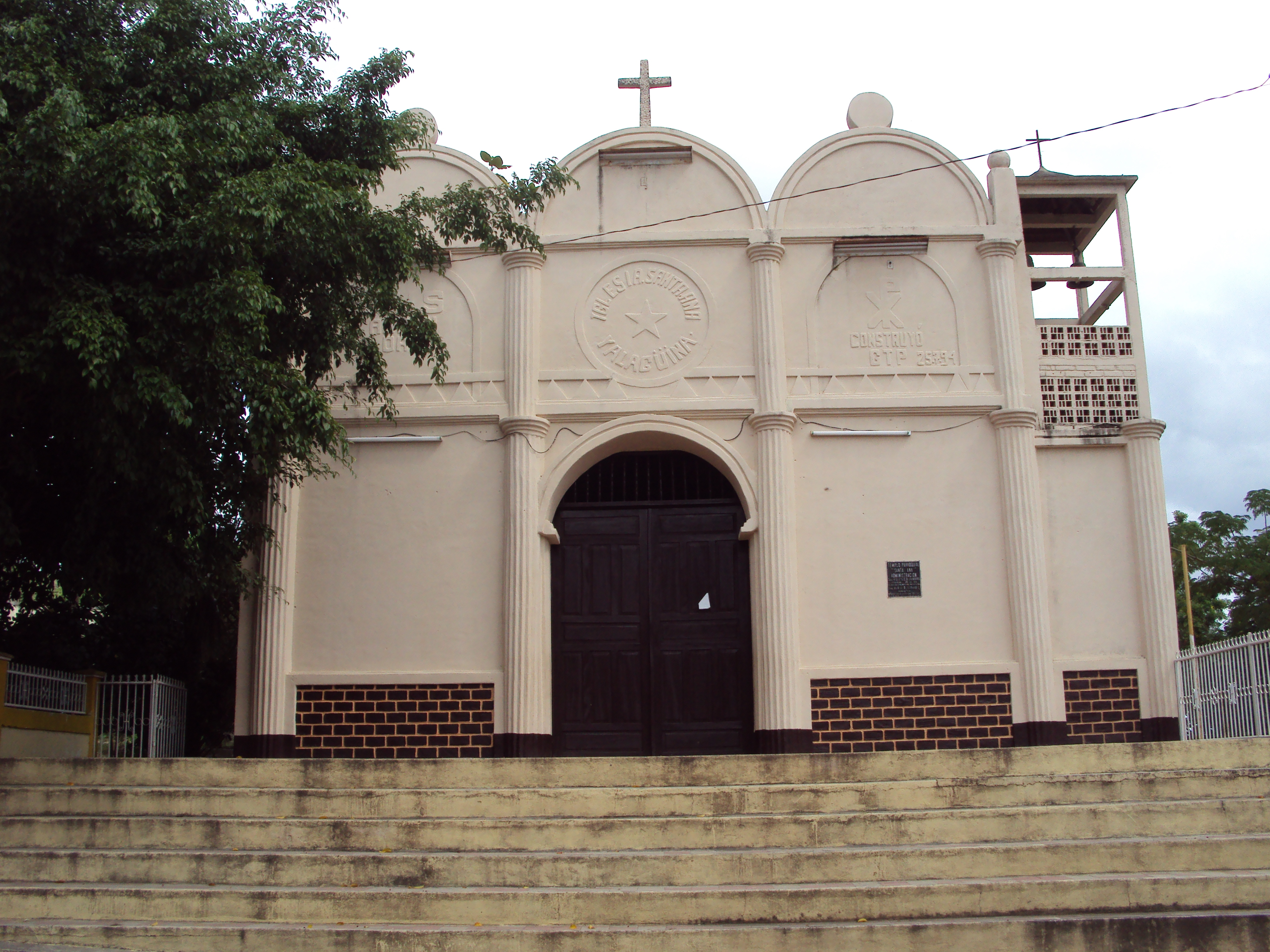
- Iglesia Santa Ana, Yalagüina

- Location in Nicaragua
- Coordinates: 13°29′N 86°29′W
- Country: Nicaragua
- Department: Madriz

Area
  - Municipality: 27 sq mi (71 km^{2})

Population (2005)
  - Municipality: 9,597
  - Density: 350/sq mi (140/km^{2})
  - Urban: 1,636
- Climate: Aw

Yalagüina (Spanish pronunciation: [ʝalaˈɣwina]) is a municipality in the Madriz department of Nicaragua.

== Geography ==
The municipal limits reach Totogalpa in the North, and Pueblo Nuevo to the South. Bordering to the East is Palacagüina and to the West is Somoto. Yalagüina is 205km from Managua.
