= 2013 UNCAF U-16 Tournament =

Torneo Sub-16 de Uncaf 2013 (in Spanish)

Tournament details
- Host country: Belize
- City: Belmopan
- Dates: 18 November – 22 November
- Teams: 6 (from 1 sub-confederation)
- Venue(s): 1 (in 1 host city)

Final positions
- Champions: Guatemala (1st title)
- Runners-up: Costa Rica
- Third place: El Salvador
- Fourth place: Honduras

Tournament statistics
- Matches played: 15
- Goals scored: 36 (2.4 per match)
- Top scorer(s): (Costa Rica) Luis Hernández (Nicaragua) Anderson Treminio (3 goals)

The 2013 UNCAF U-16 Tournament was the 5th UNCAF U-16 Tournament, a biennial international football tournament contested by men's under-16 national teams. Organized by UNCAF, the tournament took place in Belize between 18 and 22 November 2013.

The matches were played at FFB Stadium. Six Central American teams took part of the tournament, playing each other in a round-robin format. Panama didn't send a representation. Guatemala won the tournament.

== Venue ==
Belmopan
FFB Stadium
Capacity: 5,000

== Final standings ==
Pos	Team	Pld	W	D	L	GF	GA	GD	Pts	Result
1	Guatemala	5	3	1	1	8	5	+3	10	2013 UNCAF U-16 Tournament winners
2	Costa Rica	5	3	1	1	10	5	+5	10	
3	El Salvador	5	3	1	1	5	3	+2	10	
4	Honduras	5	2	2	1	4	2	+2	8	
5	Belize	5	1	0	4	4	11	−7	3	
6	Nicaragua	5	0	1	4	5	10	−5	1	

=== Results ===
18 November 2013 Day 1	El Salvador	0–2	Guatemala	Belmopan, Belize
14:00			14' de León; 19' García	Stadium: FFB Stadium

18 November 2013 Day 1	Costa Rica	2–1	Honduras	Belmopan, Belize
16:30	Hernández 41' 51'		17' Grant	Stadium: FFB Stadium

18 November 2013 Day 1	Belize	2–1	Nicaragua	Belmopan, Belize
19:00	Solórzano 20' 33'		67' Treminio	Stadium: FFB Stadium

19 November 2013 Day 2	Nicaragua	0–2	Honduras	Belmopan, Belize
14:00			35' Ortiz; 70+1' Grant	Stadium: FFB Stadium

19 November 2013 Day 2	Guatemala	1–2	Costa Rica	Belmopan, Belize
16:30	Lemus 64'		66' Hernández; 70' Gómez	Stadium: FFB Stadium

19 November 2013 Day 2	Belize	0–2	El Salvador	Belmopan, Belize
19:00			2' Meléndez; 60' Méndez	Stadium: FFB Stadium

20 November 2013 Day 3	Costa Rica	2–2	Nicaragua	Belmopan, Belize
14:00	Gómez 11'; Contreras 21'		12' Smith; 27' Treminio	Stadium: FFB Stadium

20 November 2013 Day 3	Honduras	0–0	El Salvador	Belmopan, Belize
16:30				Stadium: FFB Stadium

20 November 2013 Day 3	Belize	2–3	Guatemala	Belmopan, Belize
19:00	Sifontes 54'; Cante 64'		14' Aroche; 38' García; 56' Velásquez	Stadium: FFB Stadium

21 November 2013 Day 4	El Salvador	1–0	Costa Rica	Belmopan, Belize
14:00	Menéndez 53'			Stadium: FFB Stadium

21 November 2013 Day 4	Nicaragua	1–2	Guatemala	Belmopan, Belize
16:30	Treminio 67'		62' Lemus; 70' Alvarado	Stadium: FFB Stadium

21 November 2013 Day 4	Belize	0–1	Honduras	Belmopan, Belize
19:00			22' Canelas	Stadium: FFB Stadium

22 November 2013 Day 5	Nicaragua	1–2	El Salvador	Belmopan, Belize
14:00	Flores 27'		3' Márquez; 14' Martínez	Stadium: FFB Stadium

22 November 2013 Day 5	Guatemala	0–0	Honduras	Belmopan, Belize
16:30				Stadium: FFB Stadium

22 November 2013 Day 5	Belize	0–4	Costa Rica	Belmopan, Belize
19:00			23' Contreras; 33' Manley; 42' Martínez; 61' Ramírez	Stadium: FFB Stadium

== Goalscorers ==
3 goals:

(Costa Rica) Luis Hernández
(Nicaragua) Anderson Treminio

2 goals:

(Costa Rica) José Gómez
(Guatemala) Abel Lemus
(Belize) Rogi Solórzano
(Guatemala) Esteban García
(Honduras) Foslyn Grant
(Costa Rica) Gerald Contreras

1 goal:

(Guatemala) Brandon de León
(El Salvador) José Meléndez
(Belize) Albín Sifontes
(Belize) Brandon Cante
(Honduras) José Canelas
(El Salvador) Kevin Martínez
(Honduras) Gabriel Ortiz
(El Salvador) Carlos Méndez
(Guatemala) Armando Aroche
(Guatemala) Álvaro Velásquez
(Nicaragua) Jeyson Flores
(Costa Rica) Jonathan Martínez
(Nicaragua) Ariagner Smith
(El Salvador) Carlos Menéndez
(Guatemala) José Alvarado
(El Salvador) Marvin Márquez
(Costa Rica) Shaw Manley
(Costa Rica) Sergio Ramírez
