= John R. Lanigan =

United States Marine Corps general (1902–1974)

John Ralph Lanigan
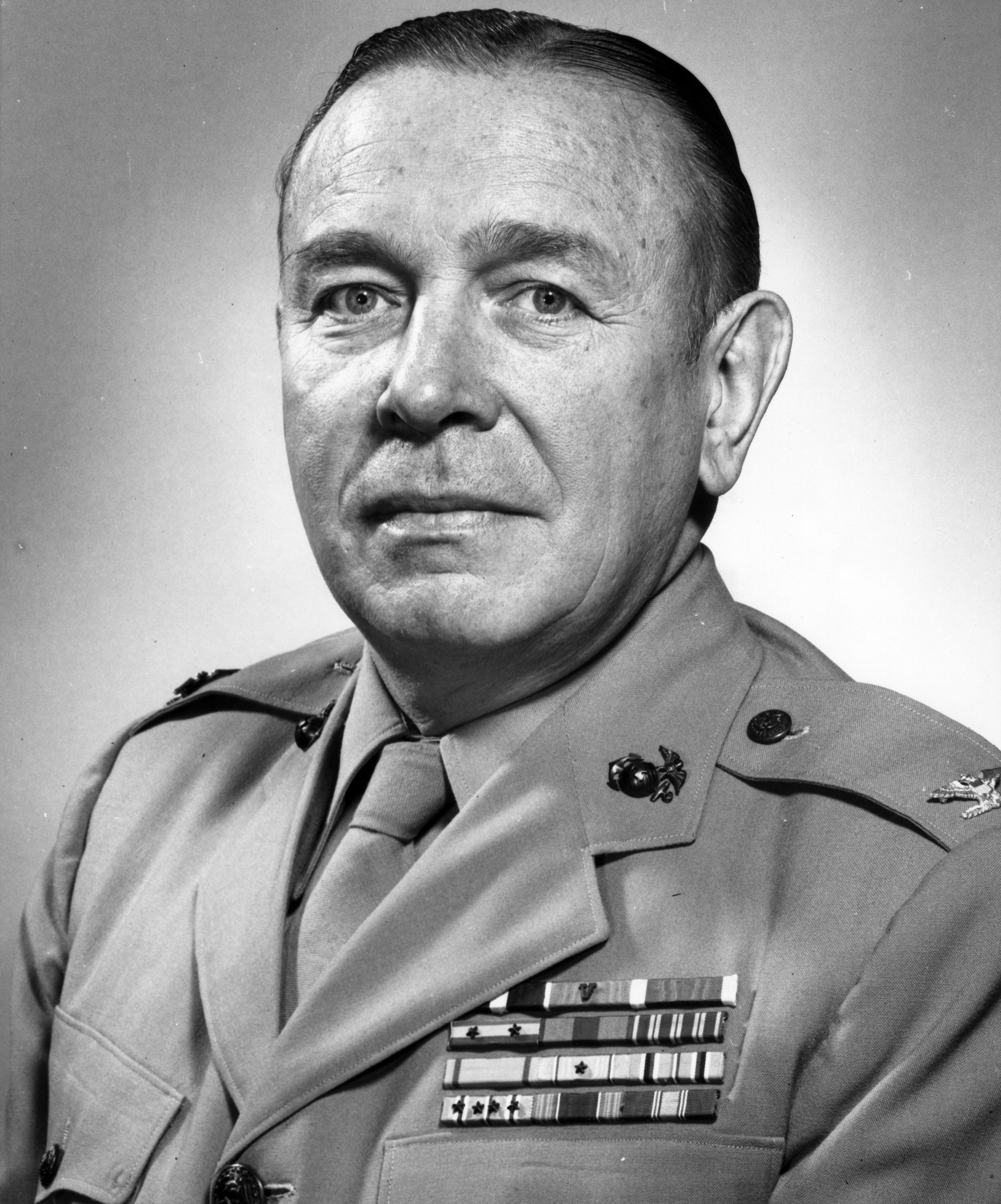
- Lanigan as Colonel, USMC
- Born: April 16, 1902; Washington, D.C., US
- Died: May 24, 1974 (aged 72); Washington, D.C., US
- Burial place: Arlington National Cemetery
- Military career
- Allegiance: United States of America
- Branch: United States Marine Corps
- Service years: 1926–1957
- Rank: Brigadier general
- Nickname: "Pat"
- Service number: 0-4128
- Commands: 25th Marine Regiment; 3rd Battalion, 23rd Marines
- Conflicts: Nicaraguan Campaign; Yangtze Patrol; World War II; Battle of Kwajalein; Battle of Saipan; Battle of Tinian; Battle of Iwo Jima
- Awards: Navy Cross; Legion of Merit; Purple Heart

John Ralph Lanigan (April 16, 1902 – May 24, 1974) was a highly decorated officer of the United States Marine Corps with the rank of brigadier general. He is most noted as commanding officer of 25th Marine Regiment during Battle of Iwo Jima. Lanigan was a recipient of the Navy Cross, the United States military's second-highest decoration awarded for valor in combat.

== Early career ==
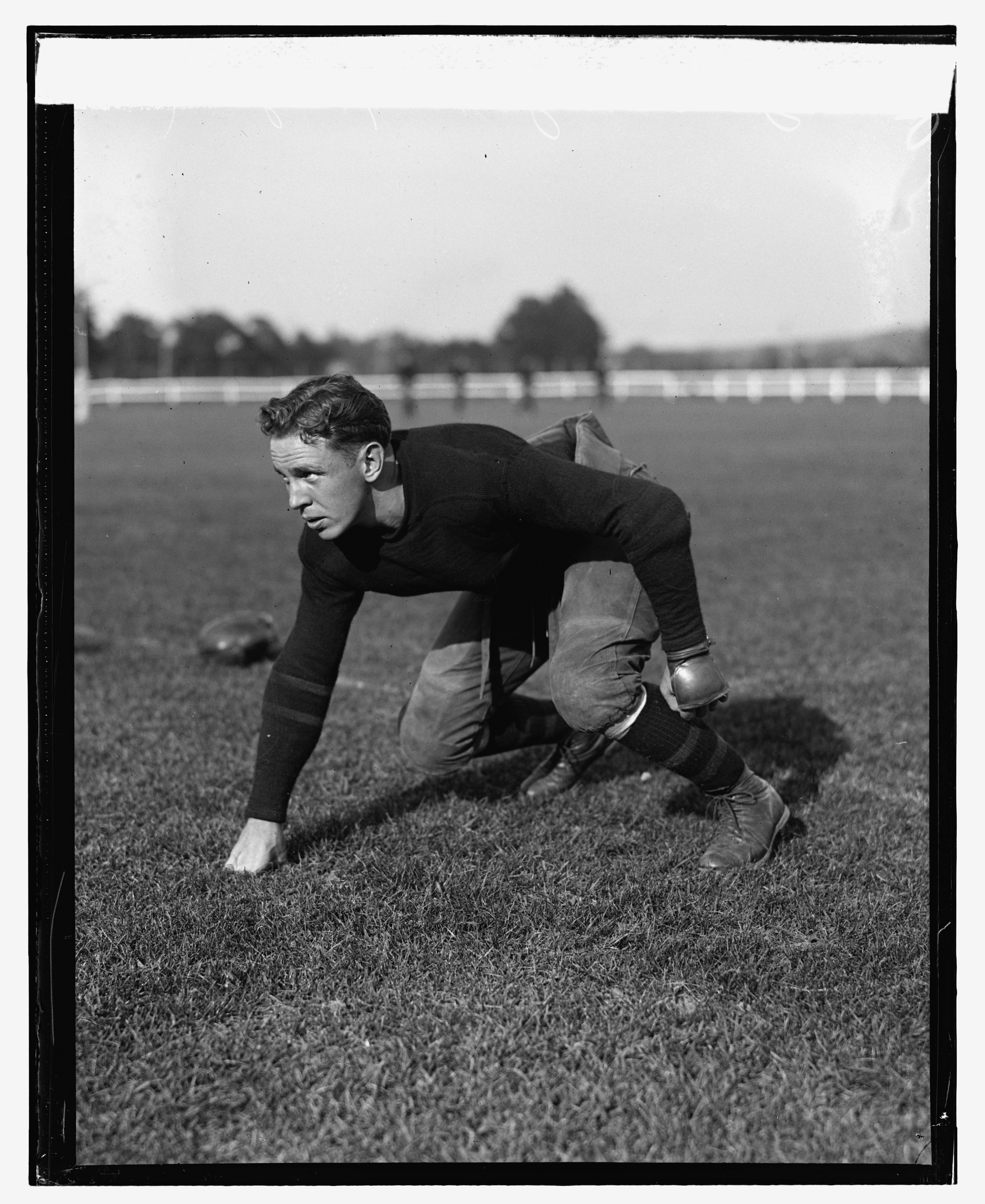
Lanigan while playing as lineman for the University of Maryland.

John R. Lanigan was born on April 16, 1902, in Washington, D.C. His parents were James Michael Lanigan (b. 1856, Limerick, Ireland d. 1909, District of Columbia, USA) and Jennie L Finnegan (b. 1863 White Sulphur Springs, Greenbrier, West Virginia, USA d. 1938 District of Columbia, USA. John was the 7th of eight children. He studied at the University of Maryland and graduated with a Bachelor Degree in the summer of 1926. During his time on the university, he was active in varsity football team and was known as “a substitute lineman whose aggressive play featured in nearly every game.”

Lanigan was commissioned second lieutenant in the Marine Corps on July 15, 1926, and ordered to the Basic School at Philadelphia Navy Yard for further officer training. He completed the school in February 1927 and assumed duties with Marine Barracks Quantico, Virginia, where he was a member of All-Marine Corps football team.

He was transferred to the Marine Barracks, Washington, D.C. in October 1927 and remained there until March of the following year, when he sailed as a member of 2nd Marine Brigade under Brigadier General Logan Feland to Nicaragua. While in the Caribbean, Lanigan participate in skirmishes with Sandino rebels at San Lucas, San Juan del Río Coco and Chipote Peak.

Lanigan returned to the United States in February 1929 and assumed duty with Marine Barracks at Naval Air Station Pensacola, Florida. He was subsequently ordered for his first sea duties in May 1930, when he was attached to the Marine detachment aboard the battleship USS California. While aboard that ship, he participated in the patrol cruises in the Pacific Ocean until October 1932, when he was ordered back to the Marine Barracks, Washington, D.C.

He was then stationed in Cape May, New Jersey from April to October 1934 and then served again in Washington, D.C. until February 1935, when he was ordered to Shanghai, China as a member of 4th Marine Regiment under the command of Colonel John C. Beaumont. Lanigan participated in guard duties in the Shanghai International Settlement until September 1937 and then returned to the United States.

Lanigan was ordered to the Marine Corps Schools, Quantico and completed the Junior course in June 1939. He then served as an instructor at the Basic School for officers at Philadelphia Navy Yard until August 1942.

== World War II ==
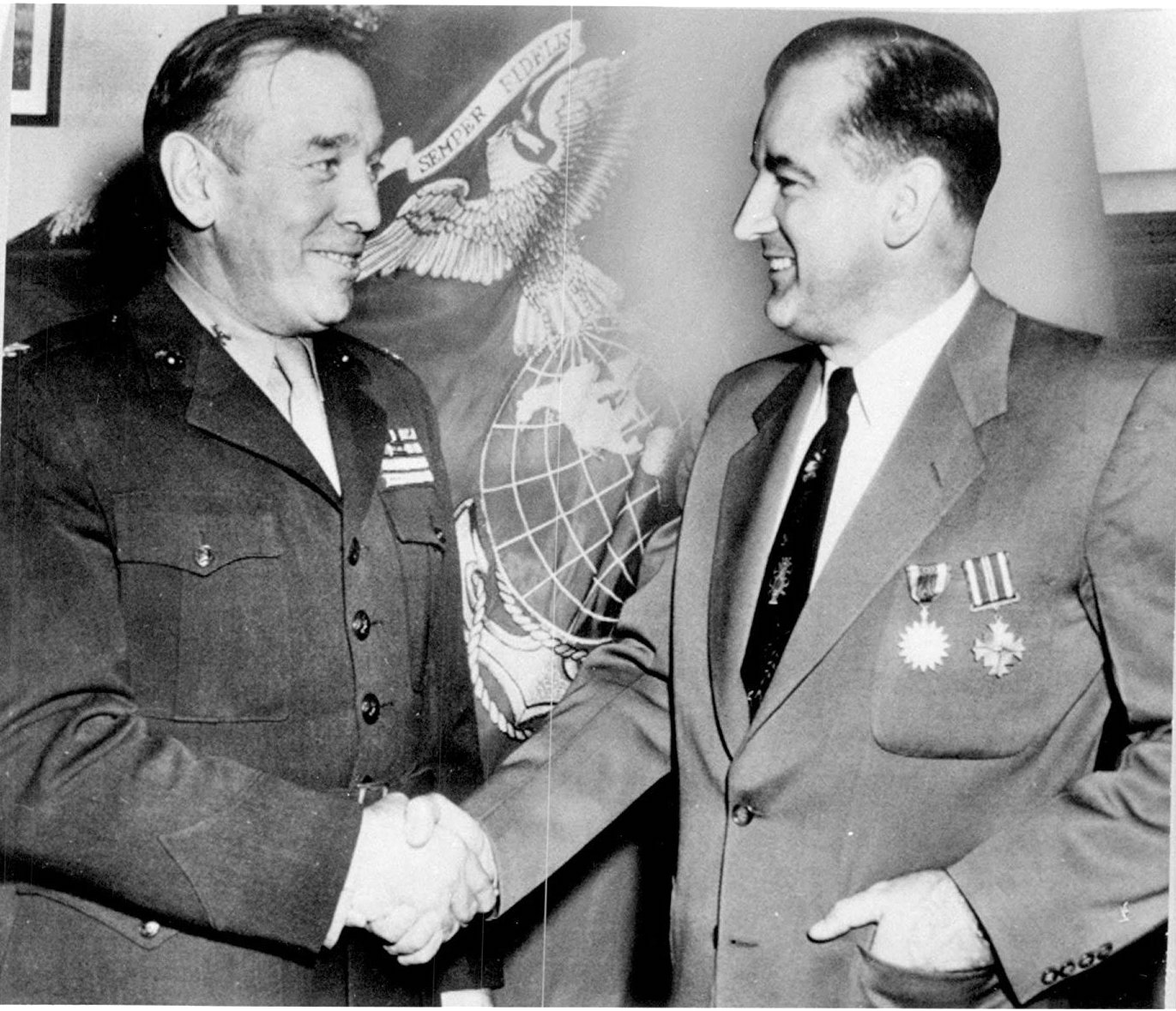
Lanigan presenting DFC and Air Medal to Senator Joseph R. McCarthy for his World War II service as Marine officer, December 1952.

With the increasing need of more marine units, 23rd Marine Regiment under Colonel Louis R. Jones was activated at Camp Lejeune, North Carolina in July 1942 and Lanigan, who was already promoted to the rank of major was appointed commanding officer of 3rd Battalion. He led the unit during the period of intensive training, before the 23rd Marine Regiment was transferred to Camp Pendleton, California in June 1943 and attached to 4th Marine Division under Major General Harry Schmidt.

Lanigan was promoted to the rank of lieutenant colonel and appointed regimental executive officer in December of that year and took part in the preparation for combat deployment to the Pacific area. The 23rd Marines sailed to the Pacific area in January 1944 in order to capture the island of Roi in the Marshalls. Kwajalein was captured one month later and Lanigan spent following four months on Maui, Hawaii.

During the capture of Saipan in the Marianas in June 1944, Lanigan was wounded by enemy fire and evacuated to the rear. He was declared fit for duty after few weeks of rest and rejoined his regiment. The 23rd Marines then took part in the capture of close Tinian and Lanigan distinguished himself during the battle. He was decorated with the Legion of Merit with Combat "V" and Navy Presidential Unit Citation.

Lanigan was promoted to the rank of colonel in August 1944 and appointed 4th Marine Division Personnel officer. He remained in this capacity until he was relieved by Colonel Orin H. Wheeler on November 1, 1944. Lanigan then relieved Colonel Merton J. Batchelder as commanding officer of 25th Marine Regiment and led his regiment during the battle of Iwo Jima in February 1945.

He distinguished himself during the landing and reorganization of the regiment following the heavy casualties, when all his battalion commanders were killed or wounded (1st Battalion – Commanding Officer LtCol Hollis U. Mustain KIA; Executive Officer Maj Henry D. Strunk WIA; 2nd Battalion – Commanding Officer LtCol Lewis C. Hudson WIA; Executive Officer Maj William P. Kaempfer WIA; 3rd Battalion – LtCol Justice M. Chambers WIA). Lanigan was decorated with the Navy Cross, the United States military's second-highest decoration awarded for valor in combat for his service on Iwo Jima.

His official Navy Cross Citation reads:

The President of the United States of America takes pleasure in presenting the Navy Cross to Colonel John R. Lanigan (MCSN: 0-4128), United States Marine Corps, for extraordinary heroism as Commanding Officer of the Twenty-Fifth Marines, FOURTH Marine Division, in action against enemy Japanese forces on Iwo Jima, Volcano Islands, from 19 February to 16 March 1945. Landing on D-Day under heavy artillery, mortar, machine-gun and rifle fire, Colonel Lanigan quickly reorganized his assault units and directed a determined attack which resulted in the capture of the highly fortified cliff on the right flank of the beach. Later, with all the original Battalion Commanders either killed or evacuated because of wounds, Colonel Lanigan accompanied the right assault battalion in further advances up the east coast, personally going from company to company and taking his place in the front lines to encourage the men of his unit. By his courage, fighting spirit and inspiring leadership, he contributed materially to the capture of strong enemy defenses and to the security of the Island, thereby upholding the highest traditions of the United States Naval Service.

== Later service ==
Following his return to the United States in June 1945, Lanigan served briefly with the Marine barracks at Naval Air Station Jacksonville, Florida, before assumed duties as officer in charge, Southern Recruiting Division in Dallas, Texas. He was ordered to Guantanamo Bay, Cuba, in June 1948 for duty as commanding officer of Marine Barracks at local Naval Base and returned to the United States in July 1950.

He then served as chief of staff, Marine Corps Recruit Depot Parris Island, South Carolina under the command of Major General Robert H. Pepper, before assumed his final duty as director of 5th Marine Corps Reserve District with headquarters in Washington, D.C., in September 1952. Lanigan retired from the Marine Corps on July 1, 1957, and was advanced to the rank of brigadier general on the retired list for having been specially commended in combat.

Lanigan settled in his native Washington, D.C., and died there on May 24, 1974. He is buried together with his wife Ann White Lanigan (1913–1990) at Arlington National Cemetery, Virginia. They had together four sons, one of whom, Michael, appeared as a guest on the TV panel show, What's My Line?, in 1961.

== Decorations ==
Here is the ribbon bar of Brigadier General John R. Lanigan:

1st Row	Navy Cross	Legion of Merit with Combat "V"	Purple Heart
2nd Row	Navy Presidential Unit Citation with two stars	Marine Corps Expeditionary Medal	Second Nicaraguan Campaign Medal
3rd Row	China Service Medal	American Defense Service Medal	American Campaign Medal
4th Row	Asiatic-Pacific Campaign Medal with four stars	World War II Victory Medal	National Defense Service Medal
