= 2007 UNCAF U-16 Tournament =

Torneo Sub-16 de Uncaf 2007 (in Spanish)

Tournament details
- Host country: Belize
- City: Belize City
- Dates: 19 September 2007– 23 September 2007
- Teams: 5 (from 1 sub-confederation)
- Venue(s): 1 (in 1 host city)

Final positions
- Champions: El Salvador (1st title)
- Runners-up: Costa Rica
- Third place: Panama
- Fourth place: Guatemala

Tournament statistics
- Matches played: 10
- Goals scored: 36 (3.6 per match)
- All statistics correct as of 23 September 2007.

The 2007 UNCAF U-16 Tournament was the 2nd UNCAF U-16 Tournament, a biennial international football tournament contested by men's under-16 national teams. Organized by UNCAF, the tournament took place in Belize between 19 and 23 September 2007.

The matches were played at MCC Grounds. Five Central American teams took part of the tournament, playing each other in a round-robin format. Honduras and Nicaragua did not send a team. El Salvador won the tournament.

== Venue ==
Belize City
MCC Grounds
Capacity: —

== Final standings ==
| Pos | Team | Pld | W | D | L | GF | GA | GD | Pts | Result |
|---|---|---|---|---|---|---|---|---|---|---|
| 1 | El Salvador | 4 | 2 | 2 | 0 | 9 | 2 | +7 | 8 | 2006 UNCAF U-16 Tournament winners |
| 2 | Costa Rica | 4 | 1 | 3 | 0 | 13 | 3 | +10 | 6 | |
| 3 | Panama | 4 | 1 | 3 | 0 | 6 | 2 | +4 | 6 | |
| 4 | Guatemala | 4 | 1 | 2 | 1 | 5 | 5 | 0 | 5 | |
| 5 | Belize | 4 | 0 | 0 | 4 | 3 | 24 | −21 | 0 | |

== Results ==
| 19 September 2007 Day 1 | Guatemala | 0–1 | El Salvador | Belize City, Belize |
| | | | 70' Guevara | Stadium: MCC Grounds |

| 19 September 2007 Day 1 | Belize | 1–5 | Panama | Belize City, Belize |
| | Belisle 18' | | 6' 42' Álvarez; 34' 43' Jiménez; 36' Linton | Stadium: MCC Grounds |

| 20 September 2007 Day 2 | Panama | 1–1 | El Salvador | Belize City, Belize |
| | Álvarez 5' | | 70' González | Stadium: MCC Grounds |

| 20 September 2007 Day 2 | Costa Rica | 2–2 | Guatemala | Belize City, Belize |
| | Arias 2'; Vega 46' | | 61' 67' León | Stadium: MCC Grounds |

| 21 September 2007 Day 3 | El Salvador | 1–1 | Costa Rica | Belize City, Belize |
| | Butstillo 4' | | 64' Moya | Stadium: MCC Grounds |

| 21 September 2007 Day 3 | Belize | 2–3 | Guatemala | Belize City, Belize |
| | Torres 24'; Adderley 26' | | 46' 52' 63' Salguero | Stadium: MCC Grounds |

| 22 September 2007 Day 4 | Guatemala | 0–0 | Panama | Belize City, Belize |
| | | | | Stadium: MCC Grounds |

| 22 September 2007 Day 4 | Costa Rica | 10–0 | Belize | Belize City, Belize |
| | Campbell 3' 66'; Vega 15' 28'; Moya 21'; Bustos 30'; Soto 35'; Arias 46' 61'; Castro 64' | | | Stadium: MCC Grounds |

| 23 September 2007 Day 5 | Panama | 0–0 | Costa Rica | Belize City, Belize |
| | | | | Stadium: MCC Grounds |

| 23 September 2007 Day 5 | Belize | 0–6 | El Salvador | Belize City, Belize |
| | | | | Stadium: MCC Grounds |
