= 2006 UNCAF U-16 Tournament =

Torneo Sub-16 de Uncaf 2006 (in Spanish)

Tournament details
- Host country: Nicaragua
- City: Diriamba
- Dates: 13 February 2006– 18 February 2006
- Teams: 6 (from 1 sub-confederation)
- Venue(s): 1 (in 1 host city)

Final positions
- Champions: Costa Rica (1st title)
- Runners-up: El Salvador
- Third place: Guatemala
- Fourth place: Panama

Tournament statistics
- Matches played: 15
- Goals scored: 29 (1.93 per match)
- Top scorer(s): (El Salvador) William Maldonado (Costa Rica) Marco Ureña (Guatemala) Ángelo Padilla (3 goals each)

The 2006 UNCAF U-16 Tournament was the 1st UNCAF U-16 Tournament, a biennial international football tournament contested by men's under-16 national teams. Organized by UNCAF, the tournament took place in Nicaragua between 13 and 18 February 2006.

The matches were played at Estadio Cacique Diriangén. Six Central American teams took part of the tournament, playing each other in a round-robin format. Belize did not send a team. Costa Rica won the tournament.

== Venue ==
Managua
Estadio Cacique Diriangén
Capacity: 8,000

== Final standings ==
Pos	Team	Pld	W	D	L	GF	GA	GD	Pts	Result
1	Costa Rica	5	3	1	1	8	3	+5	10	2006 UNCAF U-16 Tournament winners
2	El Salvador	5	3	0	2	8	2	+6	9	
3	Guatemala	5	2	2	1	5	5	0	8	
4	Panama	5	1	3	1	2	3	−1	6	
5	Honduras	5	0	4	1	4	5	−1	4	
6	Nicaragua	5	0	2	3	2	8	−6	2	

== Results ==
13 February 2006 Day 1	Guatemala	0–3	El Salvador	Diriamba, Nicaragua
			23' 30' Quintallia; 72' Maldonado	Stadium: Estadio Cacique Diriangén

13 February 2006 Day 1	Costa Rica	2–1	Panama	Diriamba, Nicaragua
	Ureña 25'; Ibarra 31' (pen.)		48' Quesada	Stadium: Estadio Cacique Diriangén

13 February 2006 Day 1	Nicaragua	1–1	Honduras	Diriamba, Nicaragua
	Reyes 31'		34' Banegas	Stadium: Estadio Cacique Diriangén

14 February 2006 Day 2	El Salvador	1–0	Honduras	Diriamba, Nicaragua
	Valencia 7'			Stadium: Estadio Cacique Diriangén

14 February 2006 Day 2	Panama	0–0	Guatemala	Diriamba, Nicaragua
				Stadium: Estadio Cacique Diriangén

14 February 2006 Day 2	Nicaragua	0–4	Costa Rica	Diriamba, Nicaragua
			44' Brenes; 49' Castro; 52' Ureña; 60' Peralta	Stadium: Estadio Cacique Diriangén

15 February 2006 Day 3	Panama	0–0	Honduras	Diriamba, Nicaragua
				Stadium: Estadio Cacique Diriangén

15 February 2006 Day 3	Guatemala	1–0	Costa Rica	Diriamba, Nicaragua
	Aroche 44'			Stadium: Estadio Cacique Diriangén

15 February 2006 Day 3	Nicaragua	0–4	El Salvador	Diriamba, Nicaragua
			4' Flores; 21' 45' Maldonado; 38' Sosa	Stadium: Estadio Cacique Diriangén

17 February 2006 Day 4	Honduras	2–2	Guatemala	Diriamba, Nicaragua
	Rojas 46' 71'		29' 55' Padilla	Stadium: Estadio Cacique Diriangén

17 February 2006 Day 4	El Salvador	0–1	Costa Rica	Diriamba, Nicaragua
			7' Castro	Stadium: Estadio Cacique Diriangén

17 February 2006 Day 4	Nicaragua	1–1	Panama	Diriamba, Nicaragua
	Reyes 71'		5' Polo	Stadium: Estadio Cacique Diriangén

18 February 2006 Day 5	Panama	1–0	El Salvador	Diriamba, Nicaragua
	de La Rosa 37'			Stadium: Estadio Cacique Diriangén

18 February 2006 Day 5	Costa Rica	1–1	Honduras	Diriamba, Nicaragua
	Ureña 60'		64' Zepeda	Stadium: Estadio Cacique Diriangén

18 February 2006 Day 5	Nicaragua	0–2	Guatemala	Diriamba, Nicaragua
			42' Figueroa; 56' Padilla	Stadium: Estadio Cacique Diriangén

== Goalscorers ==
- 3 goals:

(El Salvador) William Maldonado
(Costa Rica) Marco Ureña
(Guatemala) Ángelo Padilla

2 goals:

(El Salvador) Luis Quintanilla
(Nicaragua) Daniel Reyes
(Costa Rica) Jorge Castro
(Honduras) Roger Rojas

1 goal:

(Panama) Alberto Quesada
(El Salvador) Christian Valencia
(Guatemala) David Aroche
(El Salvador) Herbert Sosa
(Guatemala) José Figueroa
(Costa Rica) Diego Brenes
(Costa Rica) Jessy Peralta
(El Salvador) Xavier Flores
(Panama) Javier de La Rosa
(Costa Rica) Julio Ibarra
(Honduras) Santos Banegas
(Panama) Armando Polo
(Honduras) Erick Zepeda
