= Battle of Telpaneca =

- Part of the Occupation of Nicaragua, Banana Wars
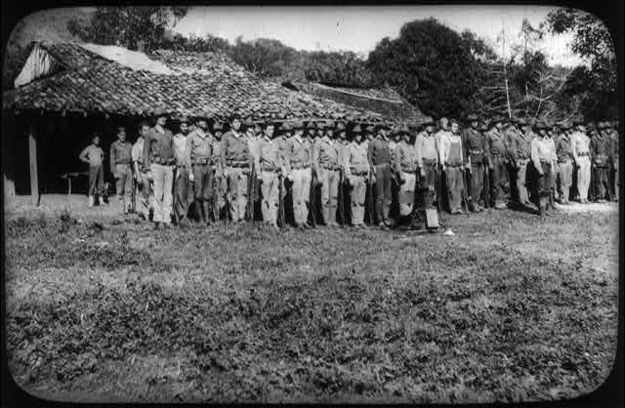
- Men of the 5th Marines garrisoning a Nicaraguan village.
Date	19 September 1927
Location	Telpaneca, Nicaragua
Result	American-Nicaraguan victory

Belligerents
United States; Nicaragua	Sandinistas

Commanders and leaders
(United States) Herbert S. Keimling	(Nicaragua) Gen. Salgado

Strength
21 marines 25 national guard	200 guerrillas

Casualties and losses
2 killed 1 wounded	25 killed 50 wounded

The Battle of Telpaneca was an engagement fought during the United States occupation of Nicaragua in 1927.

At about 1:00 am on the 19 September a force of around 200 rebel troops, loyal to Augusto César Sandino, attacked the small garrison of Telpaneca under the command of Marine First Lieutenant Herbert S. Keimling. Keimling's garrison included twenty men of the 5th Marines and a force of twenty-five Nicaraguan National Guardsmen. The first sound of the fight occurred when a rebel soldier tossed an improvised explosive at the marine barracks but it exploded without hurting anyone and only served to alert the sleeping garrison. Not long after the bombing the rebels opened up with rifle fire while the garrison was still dressing themselves. The rebels then charged the barracks under cover of fog but were beaten back by accurate fire. At that point the battle was a skirmish in which both sides engaged at a further range until about 2:30 am when the fog began to lift. The rebels then began collecting their dead and wounded and within another half-hour the fighting had ceased. Keimling estimated the loss of the enemy to be twenty-five killed and twice as many wounded while sustaining one marine killed in action, a second who died of wounds and one Nicaraguan guard who was seriously wounded.

Sandino lost one of his "generals" with the death of Salgado, and this latest defeat in a string of defeats, forced Sandino to adopt a guerrilla war.

== See also ==
- Banana Wars
- Chesty Puller
