= 2015 UNCAF U-16 Tournament =

Torneo Sub-16 de Uncaf 2015 (in Spanish)

Tournament details
- Host country: Nicaragua
- City: Managua
- Dates: November 17 – November 22
- Teams: 7 (from 1 sub-confederation)
- Venue(s): 1 (in 1 host city)

Final positions
- Champions: Costa Rica
- Runners-up: Honduras
- Third place: Panama
- Fourth place: Guatemala

Tournament statistics
- Matches played: 21
- Goals scored: 62 (2.95 per match)
- Top scorer(s): (Costa Rica) Mario Mora
- All statistics correct as of 23 November 2015.

The 2015 UNCAF U-16 Tournament was the 6th UNCAF U-16 Tournament, a biennial international football tournament contested by men's under-16 national teams. Organized by UNCAF, the tournament took place in Nicaragua between 17 and 23 November 2015.

The matches were played at Nicaragua National Football Stadium. All seven Central American teams took part of the tournament, playing each other in a round-robin format. Costa Rica won the tournament.

== Venue ==
Managua
Nicaragua National Football Stadium
Capacity: 15,000

== Final standings ==
Pos	Team	Pld	W	D	L	GF	GA	GD	Pts	Result
1	Costa Rica	6	4	2	0	18	1	+17	14	2015 UNCAF U-16 Tournament winners
2	Honduras	6	4	1	1	14	5	+9	13	
3	Panama	6	3	2	1	18	5	+13	11	
4	Guatemala	6	2	3	1	5	4	+1	9	
5	El Salvador	6	2	1	3	4	8	−4	7	
6	Nicaragua	6	1	1	4	2	15	−13	4	
7	Belize	6	0	0	6	1	24	−23	0	

== Results ==
17 November 2015 Day 1	Guatemala	0–0	El Salvador	Managua, Nicaragua
16:00		Report		Stadium: Nicaragua National Football Stadium

17 November 2015 Day 1	Panama	1–1	Costa Rica	Managua, Nicaragua
18:00	Fruto 55'	Report	33' Azofeifa	Stadium: Nicaragua National Football Stadium

17 November 2015 Day 1	Nicaragua	1–0	Belize	Managua, Nicaragua
20:00	Wilson 5'	Report		Stadium: Nicaragua National Football Stadium

18 November 2015 Day 2	Costa Rica	2–0	El Salvador	Managua, Nicaragua
16:00	Mora 65' 68'	Report		Stadium: Nicaragua National Football Stadium

18 November 2015 Day 2	Honduras	0–2	Guatemala	Managua, Nicaragua
18:00		Report	60' Soto; 65' García	Stadium: Nicaragua National Football Stadium

18 November 2015 Day 2	Nicaragua	0–5	Panama	Managua, Nicaragua
20:00		Report	5' Fruto; 12' 40' Guerrero; 19' (pen.) Valantas; 67' Headley	Stadium: Nicaragua National Football Stadium

19 November 2015 Day 3	Costa Rica	0–0	Honduras	Managua, Nicaragua
16:00		Report		Stadium: Nicaragua National Football Stadium

19 November 2015 Day 3	Belize	0–5	Panama	Managua, Nicaragua
18:00		Report	19' Guerrero; 24' Clemente; 29' Morán; 53' Valanta; 59' Rivas	Stadium: Nicaragua National Football Stadium

19 November 2015 Day 3	Nicaragua	0–2	El Salvador	Managua, Nicaragua
20:00		Report	25' Villalta; 65' Molina	Stadium: Nicaragua National Football Stadium

20 November 2015 Day 4	Belize	0–9	Costa Rica	Managua, Nicaragua
16:00		Report	14' Gómez; 22' 27' Mora; 25' Muñoz; 31' 40' Alfaro; 45' 49' Abarca; 54' Azofeifa	Stadium: Nicaragua National Football Stadium

20 November 2015 Day 4	El Salvador	0–2	Honduras	Managua, Nicaragua
18:00		Report	36' Bonilla; 48' Canara	Stadium: Nicaragua National Football Stadium

20 November 2015 Day 4	Guatemala	0–0	Panama	Managua, Nicaragua
20:00		Report		Stadium: Nicaragua National Football Stadium

21 November 2015 Day 5	El Salvador	2–0	Belize	Managua, Nicaragua
16:00	Villalta 25'; Sosa 55'	Report		Stadium: Nicaragua National Football Stadium

21 November 2015 Day 5	Costa Rica	2–0	Guatemala	Managua, Nicaragua
18:00	Alfaro 24'; Hernández 67'	Report		Stadium: Nicaragua National Football Stadium

21 November 2015 Day 5	Nicaragua	0–3	Honduras	Managua, Nicaragua
20:00		Report	17' Bonilla; 42' Canaca; 44' Mejía	Stadium: Nicaragua National Football Stadium

22 November 2015 Day 6	Panama	4–0	El Salvador	Managua, Nicaragua
16:00	Morán 7'; Headley 47'; Guerrero 61'; Clement 70+1'	Report		Stadium: Nicaragua National Football Stadium

22 November 2015 Day 6	Honduras	5–0	Belize	Managua, Nicaragua
18:00	Palma 14' 26'; Palacios 37' 45'; Bautista 38'	Report		Stadium: Nicaragua National Football Stadium

22 November 2015 Day 6	Nicaragua	1–1	Guatemala	Managua, Nicaragua
20:00	Balladares 16'	Report	64' Cifuentes	Stadium: Nicaragua National Football Stadium

23 November 2015 Day 7	Honduras	4–3	Panama	Managua, Nicaragua
16:00	Trejos 18'; Palma 26'; Vallecillo 43'; Mejía 54'	Report	3' Valantas; 11' Guerrero; Pérez	Stadium: Nicaragua National Football Stadium

23 November 2015 Day 7	Belize	1–2	Guatemala	Managua, Nicaragua
18:00	Reid 17'	Report	8' Gómez; 54' Castellanos	Stadium: Nicaragua National Football Stadium

23 November 2015 Day 7	Nicaragua	0–4	Costa Rica	Managua, Nicaragua
20:00		Report	8' 24' 59' Mora; 58' Gómez	Stadium: Nicaragua National Football Stadium

== Goalscorers ==
7 goals:

(Costa Rica) Mario Mora

4 goals:

(Panama) Eduardo Guerrero

3 goals:

(Costa Rica) José Alfaro
(Panama) Diego Valantas
(Honduras) Luis Palma

2 goals:

(Costa Rica) Nicolás Azofeifa
(Honduras) Ramón Bonilla
(Honduras) Carlos Mejía
(Costa Rica) Andrés Gómez
(Panama) Alberto Fruto
(Costa Rica) Josué Abarca
(Honduras) José Canaca
(Honduras) Patrick Palacios
(El Salvador) Fernando Villalta
(Panama) Raúl Morán
(Panama) Jorge Clemente

1 goal:

(Guatemala) Carlos Soto
(Panama) Carlos Headley
(El Salvador) Óscar Molina
(Honduras) Erick Bautista
(Panama) Trejos (1 owngoal)
(Panama) Ángel Pérez
(Guatemala) Fernando Gómez
(Guatemala) Lynner García
(Costa Rica) Andrés Hernández
(Panama) Carlos Headley
(Nicaragua) Engel Balladares
(Honduras) Vallecillo
(Guatemala) Óscar Castellanos
(Nicaragua) Wilder Wilson
(Panama) Rainel Rivas
(Costa Rica) Christian Muñoz
(El Salvador) Luis Sosa
(Guatemala) Nery Cifuentes
(Belize) Tahj Reid
