= Somoto Canyon National Monument =

- IUCN category III (natural monument or feature)
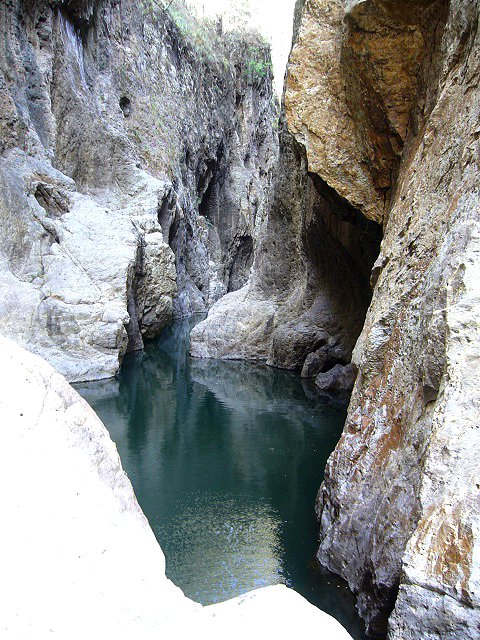
- Coco River in Somoto Canyon National Monument

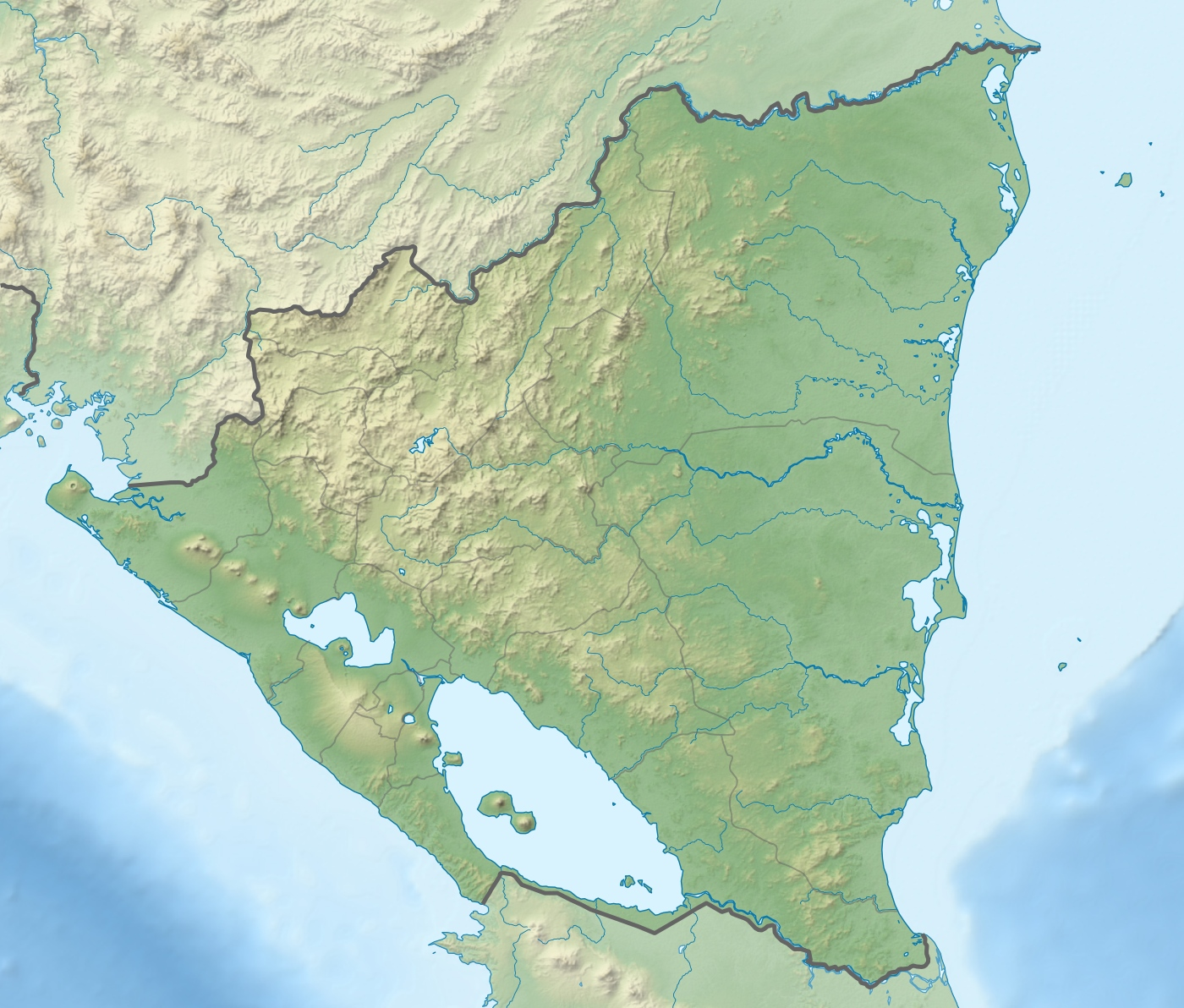
- Location within Nicaragua
- Location: Madriz department, Nicaragua
- Nearest city: El Espino
- Coordinates: 13°27′14″N 86°42′14″W
- Area: 170.31 hectares (420.8 acres)
- Established: 2006
- Governing body: Ministry of the Environment and Natural Resources

Somoto Canyon National Monument (Spanish: Monumento Nacional Cañón de Somoto) is a canyon located in the Madriz Department of Nicaragua. The Somoto Canyon National Monument protected area covers an area of approximately 170 hectares (420 acres), of which 125 hectares (310 acres) are in the actual zone of the canyon.

The confluence of the Tapacalí and Comali Rivers at the head of the canyon form the Coco River, which flows through the canyon and onward 750 kilometres (470 mi) to the Caribbean Sea.

The Somoto Canyon was declared a national monument on November 29, 2006. The Somoto Canyon National Monument comprises one of 78 protected areas of Nicaragua and is managed by Ministry of the Environment and Natural Resources (MARENA).

== History ==
The Somoto Canyon had not been explored systematically until a group of scientists from the Czech Republic and Nicaragua (INETER) "discovered" the canyon in 2004. The canyon is believed to have formed 5 to 13 million years ago during the Miocene period. After its discovery in 2004, the Somoto Canyon has been developing into a tourist attraction, further helping the growth of tourism in Nicaragua. However, this has also had a negative effect with incidents such as graffiti being written on the walls of the Canyon since its discovery. MARENA and INETER send technicians to clean and repair the vandalism.

== See also ==
- Somoto
- Tourism in Nicaragua
