= 2018 UNCAF U-16 Tournament =

Association football competition

Torneo Sub-16 de Uncaf 2018 (in Spanish)

Tournament details
- Host country: Guatemala
- City: Santa Catarina Pinula
- Dates: 20–27 October
- Teams: 7 (from 1 sub-confederation)
- Venue: 1 (in 1 host city)

Final positions
- Champions: Panama (1st title)
- Runners-up: Costa Rica
- Third place: Guatemala
- Fourth place: Nicaragua

Tournament statistics
- Matches played: 21
- Goals scored: 52 (2.48 per match)
- All statistics correct as of 27 October 2018.

The 2018 UNCAF U-16 Tournament was the 8th UNCAF U-16 Tournament, a biennial international football tournament contested by men's under-16 national teams. Organized by UNCAF, the tournament took place in Guatemala between 20 and 27 October 2018.

The matches were played at Estadio Municipal Pinula Contreras. All seven Central American teams took part of the tournament, playing each other in a round-robin format. Panama won their first title.

== Venue ==
Santa Catarina Pinula
Estadio Municipal Pinula Contreras
Capacity: —

== Final standings ==
Pos	Team	Pld	W	D	L	GF	GA	GD	Pts	Qualification
1	Panama	6	5	0	1	8	2	+6	15	Winners
2	Costa Rica	6	4	2	0	12	3	+9	14	
3	Guatemala	6	2	3	1	7	2	+5	9	
4	Nicaragua	6	2	2	2	6	6	0	8	
5	Honduras	6	2	1	3	13	10	+3	7	
6	Belize	6	1	0	5	3	19	−16	3	
7	El Salvador	6	0	2	4	3	10	−7	2	

Updated to match(es) played on 27 October 2018. Source:
Rules for classification: 1) Points; 2) Goal difference; 3) Goals scored.

=== Results ===
20 October 2018 Day 1	Nicaragua	0–0	El Salvador	Santa Catarina Pinula, Guatemala
11:00				Stadium: Estadio Municipal Pinula Contreras

20 October 2018 Day 1	Honduras	3–5	Costa Rica	Santa Catarina Pinula, Guatemala
13:15	Aguilera 7'; Bonilla 68'; Gómez 70+1'		19' (pen.) Castro; 24' 26' 35+1' Ugalde; 42' Soto	Stadium: Estadio Municipal Pinula Contreras

20 October 2018 Day 1	Guatemala	4–0	Belize	Santa Catarina Pinula, Guatemala
15:30	Palencia 15' (pen.) 18' 70+3'; Osuna 68'			Stadium: Estadio Municipal Pinula Contreras

21 October 2018 Day 2	El Salvador	0–2	Panama	Santa Catarina Pinula, Guatemala
11:00			19' Pinto; 62' Hernández	Stadium: Estadio Municipal Pinula Contreras

21 October 2018 Day 2	Belize	0–5	Honduras	Santa Catarina Pinula, Guatemala
13:15			1' Carrasco; 16' 50' Miranda; 34' Rodríguez; 42' Chávez	Stadium: Estadio Municipal Pinula Contreras

21 October 2018 Day 2	Guatemala	0–0	Costa Rica	Santa Catarina Pinula, Guatemala
15:30				Stadium: Estadio Municipal Pinula Contreras

22 October 2018 Day 3	Nicaragua	2–1	Belize	Santa Catarina Pinula, Guatemala
11:00	Medina 12' 67'		33' Palma	Stadium: Estadio Municipal Pinula Contreras

22 October 2018 Day 3	Costa Rica	1–0	Panama	Santa Catarina Pinula, Guatemala
13:15	Castro 70+1' (pen.)			Stadium: Estadio Municipal Pinula Contreras

22 October 2018 Day 3	Honduras	4–2	El Salvador	Santa Catarina Pinula, Guatemala
15:30	Barahona 24'; Medrano 41' 53'; Aguilera 68'		5' Esquivel; 20' Mauricio	Stadium: Estadio Municipal Pinula Contreras

23 October 2018 Day 4	Panama	2–0	Belize	Santa Catarina Pinula, Guatemala
11:00	Castro 10'; Pinto 60'			Stadium: Estadio Municipal Pinula Contreras

23 October 2018 Day 4	Costa Rica	1–0	Nicaragua	Santa Catarina Pinula, Guatemala
13:15	Ugalde 18'			Stadium: Estadio Municipal Pinula Contreras

23 October 2018 Day 4	Guatemala	2–0	El Salvador	Santa Catarina Pinula, Guatemala
15:30	Gaitán 29'; Lemus 49'			Stadium: Estadio Municipal Pinula Contreras

25 October 2018 Day 5	Belize	0–5	Costa Rica	Santa Catarina Pinula, Guatemala
11:00			8' Soto; 17' 21' Ugalde; 60' Coronado	Stadium: Estadio Municipal Pinula Contreras

25 October 2018 Day 5	Panama	1–0	Honduras	Santa Catarina Pinula, Guatemala
13:15	Pinto 70' (pen.)			Stadium: Estadio Municipal Pinula Contreras

25 October 2018 Day 5	Guatemala	1–1	Nicaragua	Santa Catarina Pinula, Guatemala
15:30	Lemus 41'		56' Medina	Stadium: Estadio Municipal Pinula Contreras

26 October 2018 Day 6	Costa Rica	0–0	El Salvador	Santa Catarina Pinula, Guatemala
11:00				Stadium: Estadio Municipal Pinula Contreras

26 October 2018 Day 6	Nicaragua	1–2	Panama	Santa Catarina Pinula, Guatemala
13:15	López 41'		6' Justiniani; 19' Williams	Stadium: Estadio Municipal Pinula Contreras

26 October 2018 Day 6	Guatemala	0–0	Honduras	Santa Catarina Pinula, Guatemala
15:30				Stadium: Estadio Municipal Pinula Contreras

27 October 2018 Day 7	El Salvador	1–2	Belize	Santa Catarina Pinula, Guatemala
11:00				Stadium: Estadio Municipal Pinula Contreras

27 October 2018 Day 7	Honduras	1–2	Nicaragua	Santa Catarina Pinula, Guatemala
13:15				Stadium: Estadio Municipal Pinula Contreras

27 October 2018 Day 7	Guatemala	0–1	Panama	Santa Catarina Pinula, Guatemala
15:30				Stadium: Estadio Municipal Pinula Contreras

== Goalscorers ==
TBD
