= Coco River =

River in Nicaragua and Honduras

Coco River Río Segovia, Cape River, Yara River
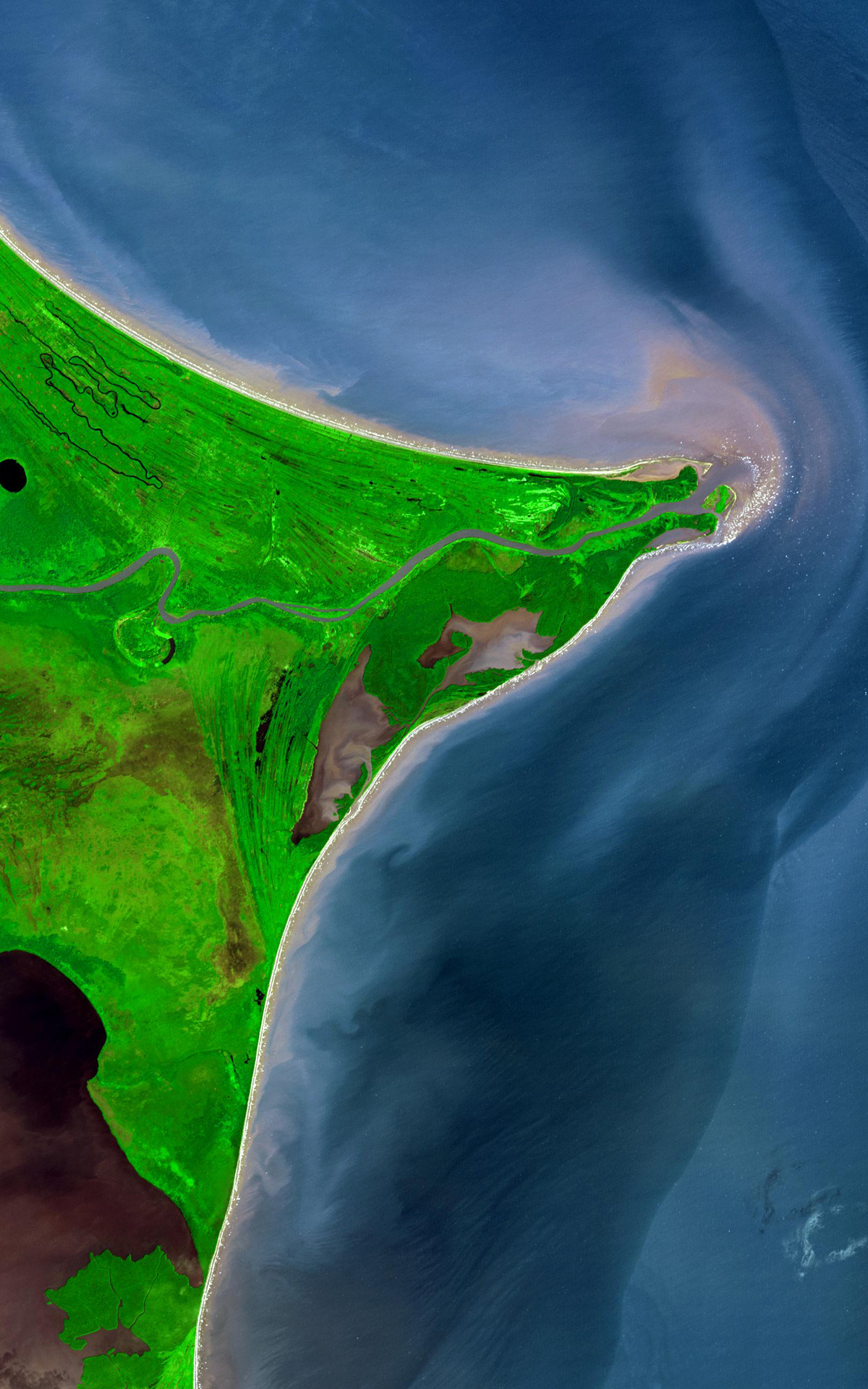

- Location of the mouth

Location
- Countries: Nicaragua and Honduras

Physical characteristics
- Source
  - location: Somoto Canyon, Madriz Department, Nicaragua
  - coordinates: 13°27′06″N 86°42′32″W
  - elevation: 2,219 ft (676 m)
- Mouth: Caribbean Sea
  - location: Nicaragua
  - coordinates: 15°00′N 83°08′W
  - elevation: 0 ft (0 m)
- Length: 841 km (523 mi)
- Basin size: 27,000 km^{2} (10,000 sq mi)
- Discharge
  - average: 600 m^{3}/s (21,000 cu ft/s)

The Coco river (Spanish: Río Coco, Miskito: Wangki, formerly known as the Río Segovia, Cape River, or Yara River) is a river located on the border of northern Nicaragua and southern Honduras. It is the longest river that runs entirely within the Central American Isthmus with a total length of 841 km (523 mi).

The river originates in the Somoto Canyon National Monument, near where the Pan American Highway crosses into Nicaragua, and flows through low mountainous terrain 841 kilometres (523 mi) into the Caribbean Sea at Cabo Gracias a Dios; the middle and lower reaches form the Honduras-Nicaragua border.

On September 7, 2007, major international news wires reported that the Río Coco was over 11 metres (36 ft) above normal stage, two days after Category 5 Hurricane Felix made landfall.

== Location ==
Point	Coordinates (links to map & photo sources)	Notes
Somoto Canyon - source	13.4518°N 86.7088°W	Elevation: 2219 ft
El Ocotal	13.6111°N 86.46944°W	Elevation: 1776 ft
Los Encuentros	13.4959°N 86.2667°W	Elevation: 1509 ft
Jicaro River confluence	13.5167°N 86.0028°W	Elev: 1150 ft
Joins Nicaraguan-Honduran border	13.8328°N 85.75278°W	Elev: 856 ft
Waspam	14.7458°N 83.9722°W	Elev: 83 ft
Cabo Gracias a Dios - mouth	15.00°N 83.1334°W	Elev: 0 ft

== See also ==
- Honduras–Nicaragua border
- List of rivers of the Americas
