= 2017 UNCAF U-16 Tournament =

Torneo Sub-16 de Uncaf 2017 (in Spanish)

Tournament details
- Host country: El Salvador
- City: San Salvador
- Dates: 20 November – 25 November
- Teams: 5 (from 1 sub-confederation)
- Venue(s): 1 (in 1 host city)

Final positions
- Champions: Costa Rica (5th title)
- Runners-up: Panama
- Third place: El Salvador
- Fourth place: Honduras

Tournament statistics
- Matches played: 10
- Goals scored: 21 (2.1 per match)

The 2017 UNCAF U-16 Tournament was the 7th UNCAF U-16 Tournament, a biennial international football tournament contested by men's under-16 national teams. Organized by UNCAF, the tournament took place in El Salvador between 20 and 25 November 2017.

The matches were played at Complejo Deportivo FESFUT. Five Central American teams took part of the tournament, playing each other in a round-robin format. Guatemala did not participate due to their sanction by FIFA and Belize did not send a team.

== Venue ==
San Salvador
Complejo Deportivo FESFUT
Capacity: —

== Final standings ==
Pos	Team	Pld	W	D	L	GF	GA	GD	Pts	Result
1	Costa Rica	4	3	0	1	8	4	+4	9	2017 UNCAF U-16 Tournament winners
2	Panama	4	1	3	0	4	1	+3	6	
3	El Salvador	4	1	2	1	3	2	+1	5	
4	Honduras	4	1	2	1	2	3	−1	5	
5	Nicaragua	4	0	1	3	2	9	−7	1	

=== Results ===
20 November 2017 Day 1	Panama	4–1	Costa Rica	San Salvador, El Salvador
15:00				Stadium: Complejo Deportivo FESFUT; Referee: Selvin Brown (HON)

20 November 2017 Day 1	El Salvador	3–1	Nicaragua	San Salvador, El Salvador
17:00	Serrano; López; Barahona		Oliva	Stadium: Complejo Deportivo FESFUT; Referee: Rigo Prendas (CRC)

21 November 2017 Day 2	Nicaragua	1–2	Honduras	San Salvador, El Salvador
15:00				Stadium: Complejo Deportivo FESFUT; Referee: César Quintanilla (SLV)

21 November 2017 Day 2	El Salvador	0–0	Panama	San Salvador, El Salvador
17:00				Stadium: Complejo Deportivo FESFUT; Referee: Luís García (NCA)

22 November 2017 Day 3	Panama	0–0	Nicaragua	San Salvador, El Salvador
15:00				Stadium: Complejo Deportivo FESFUT; Referee: Selvin Brown (HON)

22 November 2017 Day 3	Honduras	0–2	Costa Rica	San Salvador, El Salvador
17:00				Stadium: Complejo Deportivo FESFUT; Referee: Óliver Vergara (PAN)

24 November 2017 Day 4	Costa Rica	4–0	Nicaragua	San Salvador, El Salvador
15:00	Castro 1' 27'; Céspedes 15'; Muñoz 33'			Stadium: Complejo Deportivo FESFUT; Referee: César Quintanilla (SLV)

24 November 2017 Day 4	El Salvador	0–0	Honduras	San Salvador, El Salvador
17:00				Stadium: Complejo Deportivo FESFUT; Referee: Rigo Prendas (CRC)

25 November 2017 Day 5	Honduras	0–0	Panama	San Salvador, El Salvador
17:00				Stadium: Complejo Deportivo FESFUT; Referee: Luís García (NCA)

25 November 2017 Day 5	El Salvador	0–1	Costa Rica	San Salvador, El Salvador
19:00			44' (pen.) Castro	Stadium: Complejo Deportivo FESFUT; Referee: Óliver Vergara (PAN)
