= San Lucas, Nicaragua =

San Lucas
- Municipality
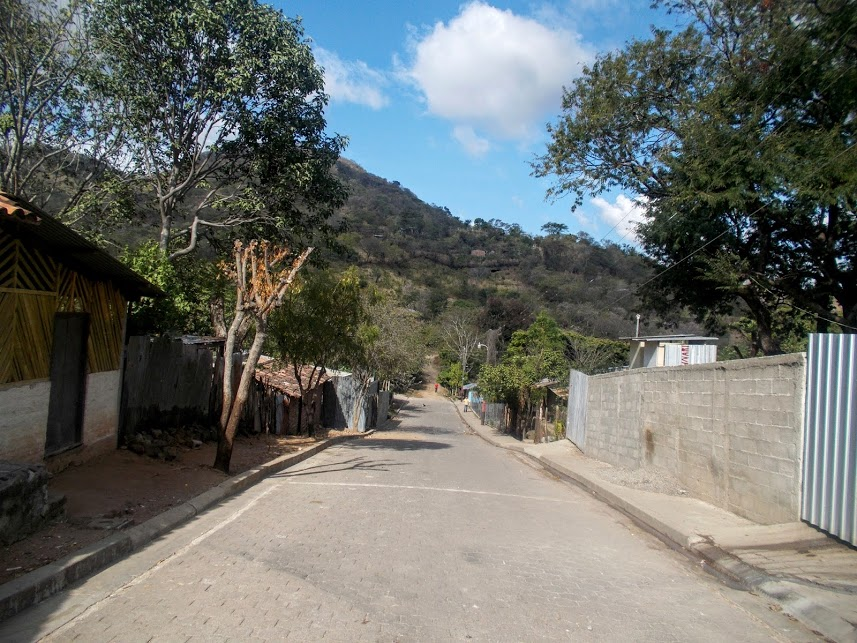
- Street view of San Lucas, Madriz, Nicaragua.

- Location in Nicaragua
- Coordinates: 13°25′N 86°36′W
- Country: Nicaragua
- Department: Madriz

Area
  - Municipality: 59 sq mi (152 km^{2})

Population (2023)
  - Municipality: 16,902
  - Density: 288/sq mi (111/km^{2})
  - Urban: 3,653
- Postal code: 35400
- Climate: Aw

San Lucas is a municipality in the Madriz department of Nicaragua. It is located 227 kilometres from the capital Managua and almost 8,5 kilometres from Somoto.
