= 2009 UNCAF U-16 Tournament =

Torneo Sub-16 de Uncaf 2009 (in Spanish)

Tournament details
- Host country: Costa Rica
- City: Guápiles
- Dates: 4 August 2009– 8 August 2009
- Teams: 5 (from 1 sub-confederation)
- Venue: 1 (in 1 host city)

Final positions
- Champions: Costa Rica (2nd title)
- Runners-up: Panama
- Third place: Guatemala
- Fourth place: El Salvador

Tournament statistics
- Matches played: 10
- Goals scored: 36 (3.6 per match)
- All statistics correct as of 8 August 2009.

The 2009 UNCAF U-16 Tournament was the 3rd UNCAF U-16 Tournament, a biennial international football tournament contested by men's under-16 national teams. Organized by UNCAF, the tournament took place in Costa Rica between 4 and 8 August 2009.

The matches were played at Estadio Ebal Rodríguez. Five Central American teams took part of the tournament, playing each other in a round-robin format. Honduras and Belize did not send a team.

== Venue ==
Guápiles
Estadio Ebal Rodríguez
Capacity: 3,000

== Final standings ==
Pos	Team	Pld	W	D	L	GF	GA	GD	Pts	Qualification
1	Costa Rica	4	4	0	0	15	1	+14	12	2009 UNCAF U-16 Tournament winners
2	Panama	4	3	0	1	7	5	+2	9	
3	Guatemala	4	2	0	2	8	6	+2	6	
4	El Salvador	4	1	0	3	3	10	−7	3	
5	Nicaragua	4	0	0	4	3	14	−11	0	

=== Results ===
4 August 2009 Day 1	El Salvador	0–5	Guatemala	Guápiles, Costa Rica
17:30				Stadium: Estadio Ebal Rodríguez

4 August 2009 Day 1	Costa Rica	5–0	Nicaragua	Guápiles, Costa Rica
19:30				Stadium: Estadio Ebal Rodríguez

5 August 2009 Day 2	Panama	2–0	El Salvador	Guápiles, Costa Rica
17:30				Stadium: Estadio Ebal Rodríguez

5 August 2009 Day 2	Costa Rica	4–0	Guatemala	Guápiles, Costa Rica
19:30				Stadium: Estadio Ebal Rodríguez

6 August 2009 Day 3	Nicaragua	1–3	Panama	Guápiles, Costa Rica
17:30				Stadium: Estadio Ebal Rodríguez

6 August 2009 Day 3	Costa Rica	2–0	El Salvador	Guápiles, Costa Rica
19:30				Stadium: Estadio Ebal Rodríguez

7 August 2009 Day 4	El Salvador	3–1	Nicaragua	Guápiles, Costa Rica
17:30				Stadium: Estadio Ebal Rodríguez

7 August 2009 Day 4	Guatemala	0–1	Panama	Guápiles, Costa Rica
19:30				Stadium: Estadio Ebal Rodríguez

8 August 2009 Day 5	Nicaragua	1–3	Guatemala	Guápiles, Costa Rica
17:30				Stadium: Estadio Ebal Rodríguez

8 August 2009 Day 5	Costa Rica	4–1	Panama	Guápiles, Costa Rica
19:30				Stadium: Estadio Ebal Rodríguez
