= Wilder Wilson =

Nicaraguan footballer (born 2000)

Personal information
- Full name: Wilder Alfredo Wilson Pérez
- Date of birth: 1 July 2000 (age 26)
- Place of birth: Somoto, Nicaragua
- Height: 1.75 m (5 ft 9 in)
- Position: Centre-back

Senior career*
Years	Team	Apps	(Gls)
2016–2019	Real Madriz	25	(0)
2019	Diriangén	4	(0)
2020	Real Madriz	11	(1)
2020	Junior de Managua	14	(2)

International career^{‡}
2016	Nicaragua U17		
2018	Nicaragua U20		
2019	Nicaragua U23		
2019	Nicaragua	2	(0)
- * Club domestic league appearances and goals as of 7:09, 28 December 2019 (UTC) ‡ National team caps and goals as of 7:09, 28 December 2019 (UTC)

Wilder Alfredo Wilson Pérez (born July 1, 2000) is a Nicaraguan footballer who plays as a centre-back.

== International career ==
Wilson captained the Nicaragua U17s at the 2017 CONCACAF U-17 Championship qualifiers in November 2016 in Costa Rica, and later played at the 2018 UNCAF U-19 Tournament in Honduras. He was also called up to the Nicaragua Olympic team for the 2020 CONCACAF Men's Olympic Qualifying Championship qualification.

He made his debut for the Nicaragua senior national team on October 14, 2019, coming on for Kevin Serapio during a 4–0 win over Dominica in the 2019–20 CONCACAF Nations League.

== International statistics ==
As of match played 27 December 2019.

National team	Year	Apps	Goals
Nicaragua	2019	2	0
Total		2	0
