= UNCAF U-16 Tournament =

Association football competition

- Founded: 2006; 20 years ago
- Region: Central America (UNCAF)
- Teams: 7
- Website: U-16 Tournament
- 2018 UNCAF U-16 Tournament

The UNCAF U-16 Tournament is an association football competition contested by the under-16 national teams of the members of the Central American Football Union (UNCAF), the sport's Central American governing body. The tournament is played every two years since 2006 and serves as a preparation competition for the CONCACAF Under-17 Championships. Panama is the current champion.

== Results ==
Year	Winners	Runners-up
2006	Costa Rica	El Salvador
2007	El Salvador	Costa Rica
2009	Costa Rica	Panama
2011	Costa Rica	Panama
2013	Guatemala	Costa Rica
2015	Costa Rica	Honduras
2017	Costa Rica	Panama
2018	Panama	Costa Rica
2022	Honduras	Mexico
2024	Guatemala	Honduras
2025	Costa Rica	Guatemala
2026	El Salvador	Panama
