= San José de Cusmapa =

- Municipality
- Location in Nicaragua
- Coordinates: 13°17′N 86°39′W
- Country: Nicaragua
- Department: Madriz

Area
  - Municipality: 50 sq mi (130 km^{2})

Population (2005)
  - Municipality: 7,072
  - Density: 140/sq mi (54/km^{2})
  - Urban: 1,405
- Climate: Aw

San José de Cusmapa is a municipality in the Madriz department of Nicaragua.

== Demographics ==
San José de Cusmapa has a current population of 8,441 inhabitants.
