= Santa Catarina Pinula =

- Municipality
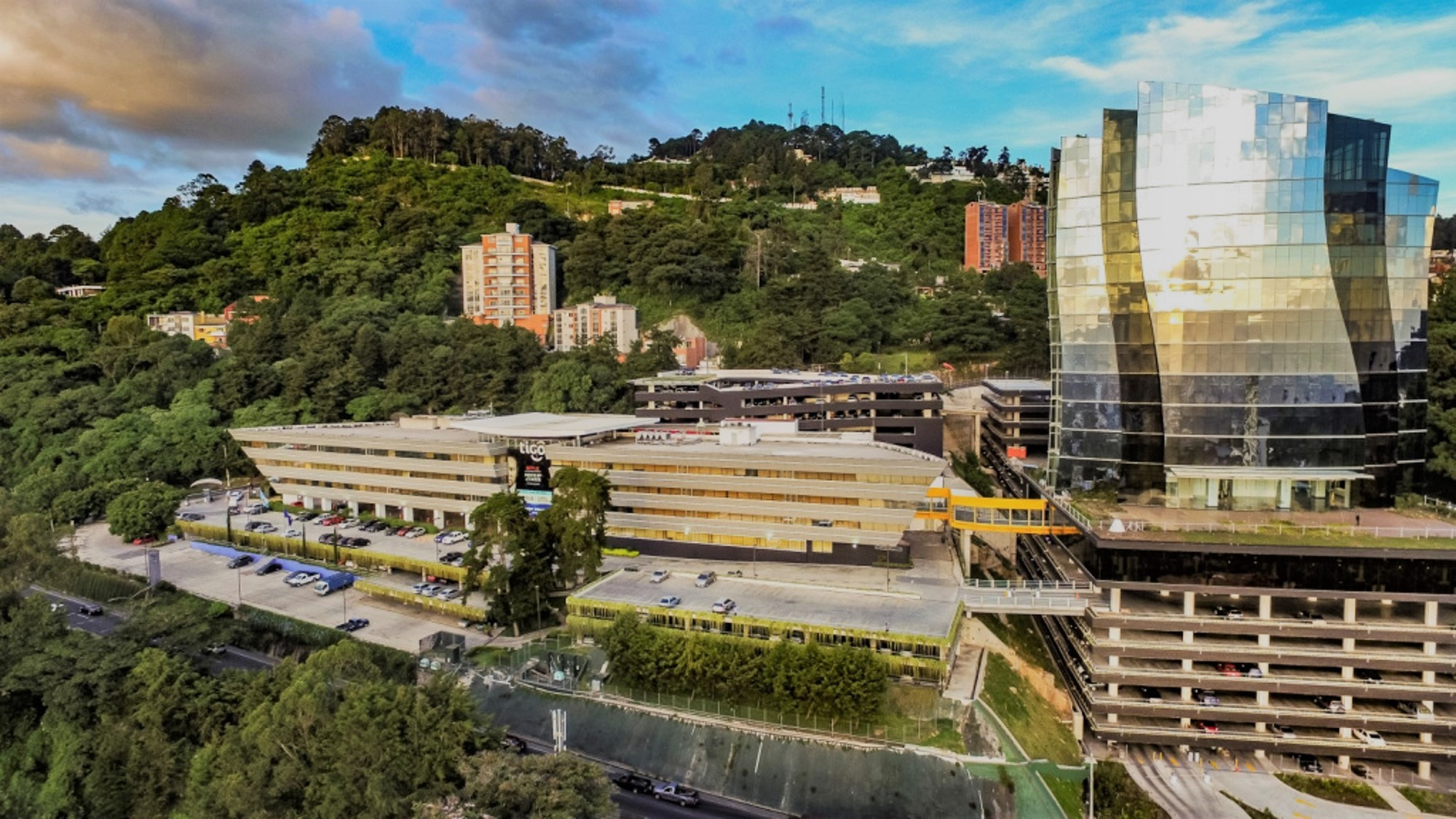

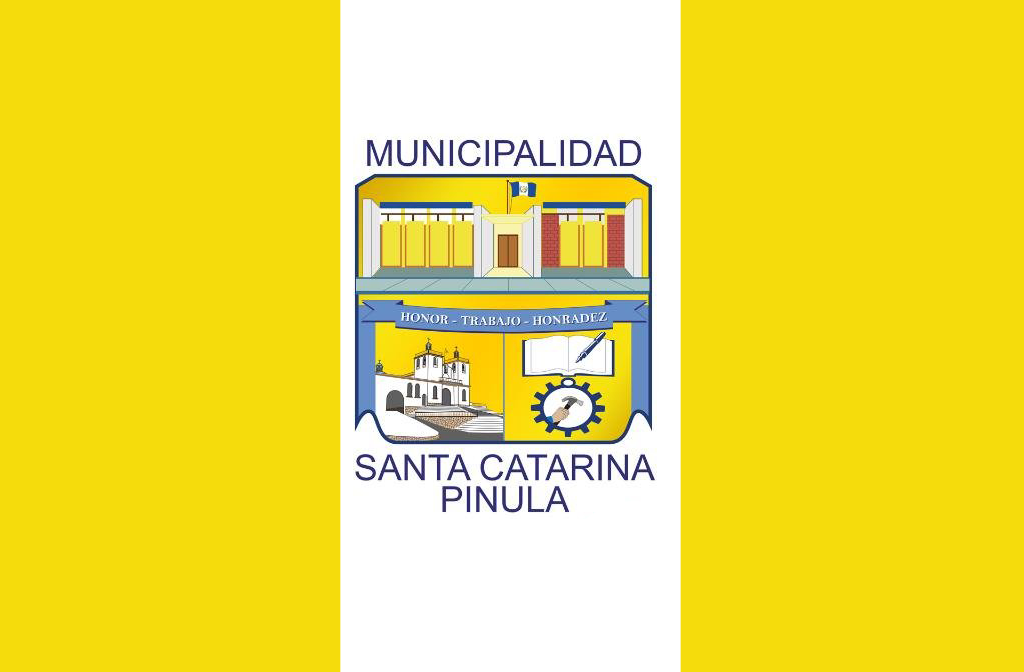
- Flag

- Location in Guatemala Department Santa Catarina Pinula (Guatemala)
- Country: Guatemala
- Department: Guatemala
- Municipality: Santa Catarina Pinula
- Established: 1839

Government
  - Mayor (2020-2024): Sebastian Siero (PP)

Area
  - Total: 49.3 km^{2} (19.0 sq mi)
- Elevation: 1,640 m (5,380 ft)

Population (2022)
  - Total: 87,362
  - Density: 1,770/km^{2} (4,590/sq mi)
- Demonym(s): catarinense, pinulteco
- Time zone: GMT -6
- Climate: Cwb
- Website: Municipalidad de Santa Catarina Pinula

Santa Catarina Pinula is a town, with a population of 70,982 (2018 census) and a municipality in the Guatemala Department of Guatemala.

== Names ==
Its name, according to Guatemalan colonial historian Francisco Antonio de Fuentes y Guzmán in his book Recordación Florida comes from:

- Santa Catarina: the name of it saint patron Catherine of Alexandria
- Pinula: from pipil "Flour of water" ("Pinul": Flour of Pinole and "Ha": Water). This may come from the Mexican natives who came alongside Alvarado's forces.

== History ==
The town was originally a native settlement called Pankaj, or Pinola, whose inhabitants presented a strong defense to the conquistadors from Pedro de Alvarado, until they had to finally surrender to the Spanish invaders at the fortified position of Jalpatagua, where they were withdrawn along with the Petapa natives.

=== Spanish colony ===
After the Spanish conquest, a town was founded in place of the old native settlement. It soon became one of the most notable settlements in the area, eventually serving as a curato headquarters for the Order of Preachers, which in turn was under the jurisdiction of the Amatitlán convent.

Order of Preachers doctrines and curatos in the Capitanía General of Guatemala in 1638
Convento	Doctrinas	Convento	Doctrinas
Guatemala	Chimaltenango; Jocotenango; Sumpango; San Juan Sacatepéquez; San Pedro Sacatepéquez; Santiago Sacatepéquez; Rabinal; San Martín Jilotepeque; Escuintla; Milpas Altas; Milpas Bajas; San Lucas Sacatepéquez; Barrio de Santo Domingo	Amatitlán	Amatitlán; Petapa; Mixco; San Cristóbal
Guatemala	Chimaltenango; Jocotenango; Sumpango; San Juan Sacatepéquez; San Pedro Sacatepéquez; Santiago Sacatepéquez; Rabinal; San Martín Jilotepeque; Escuintla; Milpas Altas; Milpas Bajas; San Lucas Sacatepéquez; Barrio de Santo Domingo	Verapaz	Cahabón; Cobán; Chamelco; San Cristóbal; Tactic
Guatemala	Chimaltenango; Jocotenango; Sumpango; San Juan Sacatepéquez; San Pedro Sacatepéquez; Santiago Sacatepéquez; Rabinal; San Martín Jilotepeque; Escuintla; Milpas Altas; Milpas Bajas; San Lucas Sacatepéquez; Barrio de Santo Domingo	Sonsonate	Nahuizalco; Tacuxcalco
San Salvador	Apastepeque; Chontales; Cojutepeque; Cuscatlán; Milpas Bajas; Tonacatepeque	Sacapulas	Sacapulas; Cunén; Nebaj; Santa Cruz; San Andrés Sajcabajá; Zacualpa; Chichicastenango

In 1690, when Fuentes y Guzmán wrote Recordación Florida the town was prosperous and its agriculture was booming, but it was not as well to do if its silver mines had been exploited. Fuentes y Guzmán told the story that, when the church was being built, the workers found a thick silver lining, but they rushed to hide it from the Spaniards, so the latter could not use it.

In 1754, due to a Royal Decree, all the doctrines and curatos still belonging to regular orders were transferred to the secular clergy authorities.

=== El Cambray II tragedy: 2015 ===
On the night of 1 October 2015 and following several days of heavy rains, a hill collapsed causing a mudslide that destroyed El Cambray II settlement, leaving behind hundreds of missing people, according to the first official reports. Besides, there were nine confirmed deaths, 34 injured and up to 65 displaced on more than 100 destroyed homes. After the landslide, the area was in Code Red.

== Administrative organization ==
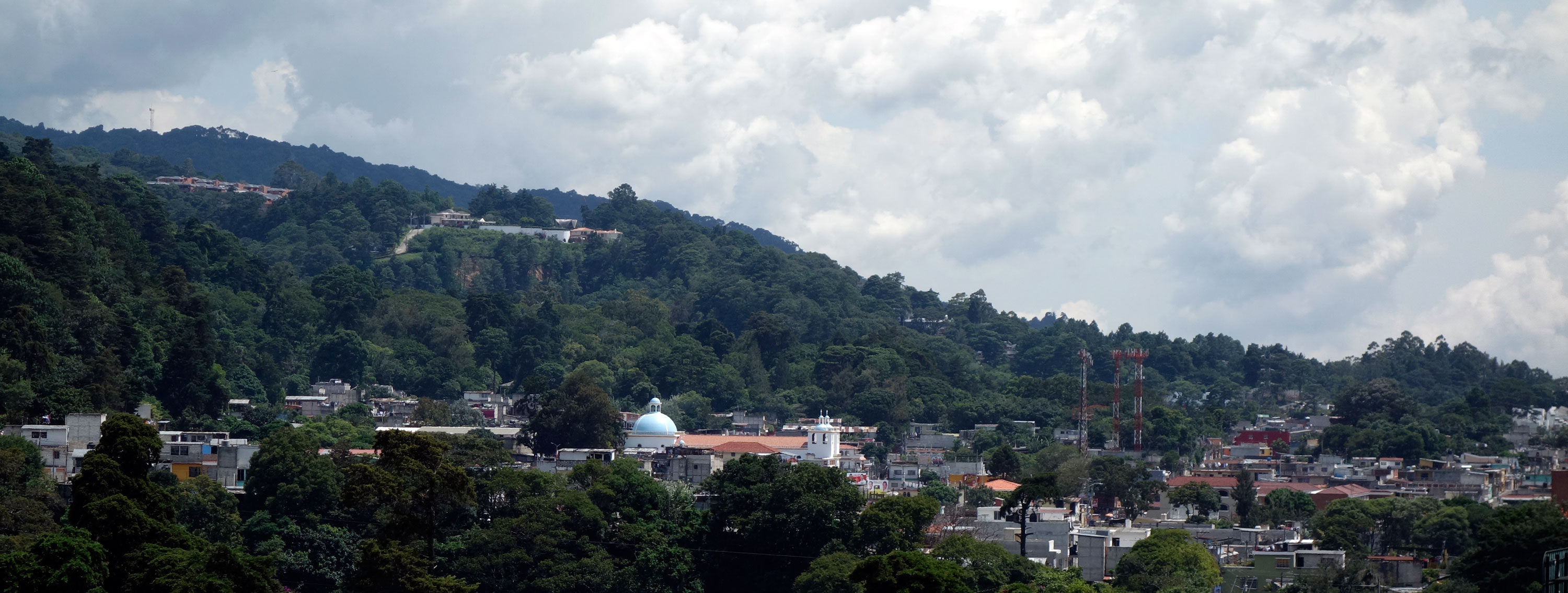
Santa Catarina Pinula as seen from the Inter American Highway.

The region has a municipal capital (Santa Catarina Pinula), fifteen villages and seven settlements.

Santa Catarina Pinula administrative division
Division / Name; Villages / Cuchilla del Carmen; Villages / El Carmen; Villages / Salvadora I; Villages / Salvadora II; Villages / El Pueblito; Villages / Nueva Concepción; Villages / Puerta Parada; Villages / Piedra Parada Cristo Rey; Villages / Piedra Parada El Rosario; Villages / San José El Manzano; Villages / Laguna Bermeja; Villages / El Pajón; Villages / Manzano La Libertad; Villages / Don Justo; Villages / Canchón	Subdivisión / Nombre; Settlements / Trapichito; Settlements / Pepe Nance; Settlements / Cambray I; Settlements / Cambray II; Settlements / El Zarzal; Settlements / Los Cipreses; Settlements / Laguneta

== Climate ==
Santa Catarina Pinula has a subtropical highland climate (Köppen: Cwb).

Climate data for Santa Catarina Pinula
Month	Jan	Feb	Mar	Apr	May	Jun	Jul	Aug	Sep	Oct	Nov	Dec	Year
Mean daily maximum °C (°F)	23.5 (74.3)	24.7 (76.5)	26.1 (79.0)	26.7 (80.1)	26.2 (79.2)	24.4 (75.9)	24.4 (75.9)	24.8 (76.6)	24.2 (75.6)	23.6 (74.5)	23.2 (73.8)	23.2 (73.8)	24.6 (76.3)
Daily mean °C (°F)	17.7 (63.9)	18.5 (65.3)	19.6 (67.3)	20.5 (68.9)	20.6 (69.1)	19.9 (67.8)	19.8 (67.6)	19.9 (67.8)	19.6 (67.3)	19.1 (66.4)	18.3 (64.9)	17.8 (64.0)	19.3 (66.7)
Mean daily minimum °C (°F)	12.0 (53.6)	12.3 (54.1)	13.2 (55.8)	14.3 (57.7)	15.1 (59.2)	15.5 (59.9)	15.3 (59.5)	15.1 (59.2)	15.1 (59.2)	14.7 (58.5)	13.4 (56.1)	12.4 (54.3)	14.0 (57.3)
Average precipitation mm (inches)	3 (0.1)	2 (0.1)	6 (0.2)	27 (1.1)	155 (6.1)	270 (10.6)	234 (9.2)	186 (7.3)	249 (9.8)	157 (6.2)	30 (1.2)	7 (0.3)	1,326 (52.2)
Source: Climate-Data.org

== Sport ==
Guatemalan Olympic swimmer Kevin Avila Soto was born here.

== Geographic location ==
Santa Catarina Pinula is completely surrounded by Guatemala Department municipalities:

== See also ==
- List of places in Guatemala

== Notes and references ==
=== Bibliography ===
- Belaubre, Christopohe (2001). "Poder y redes sociales en Centroamérica: el caso de la Orden de los Dominicos (1757-1829)" (PDF). Mesoamérica. 41. Archived from the original (PDF) on 21 January 2015.
- Fuentes y Guzmán, Francisco Antonio de (1883) [1690]. Zaragoza, Justo; Navarro, Luis (eds.). Recordación Florida. Discurso historial y demostración natural, material, militar y política del Reyno de Guatemala (in Spanish). Vol. II. Madrid, España: Central.
- Juarros, Domingo (1818). Compendio de la historia de la Ciudad de Guatemala (in Spanish). Guatemala: Ignacio Beteta.
- van Oss, Adriaan C. (1986). Catholic Colonialism: A Parish History of Guatemala, 1524-1821. Cambridge, UK: Cambridge University Press. ISBN 9780521527125.
