= Óscar Linton =

Panamense football player (born 1993)

Personal information
- Full name: Óscar Antonio Linton Bethancourt
- Date of birth: 29 January 1993 (age 33)
- Place of birth: Panama City, Panama
- Position: Defender

Senior career*
Years	Team	Apps	(Gls)
–2016	Chepo	147	(3)
2016–2017	Atlético Nacional	21	(4)
2018–2020	Costa del Este F.C.	53+	(6+)
2020–2021	Sliema Wanderers	13	(1)
2021	FC Imabari	1	(0)
2021-	Sliema Wanderers		

International career
- Panama U17
2020-	Panama	4	(0)
- * Club domestic league appearances and goals

Óscar Antonio Linton Bethancourt (born 29 January 1993) is a Panamanian professional footballer who plays as a defender.

== Career ==
In 2020, Linton signed for Sliema Wanderers, Malta's most successful team. After six months in Japan, Linton returned to help Sliema in the second half of the 2021–22 campaign.
