= Luis Hernández (Costa Rican footballer) =

Costa Rican football player (born 1998)

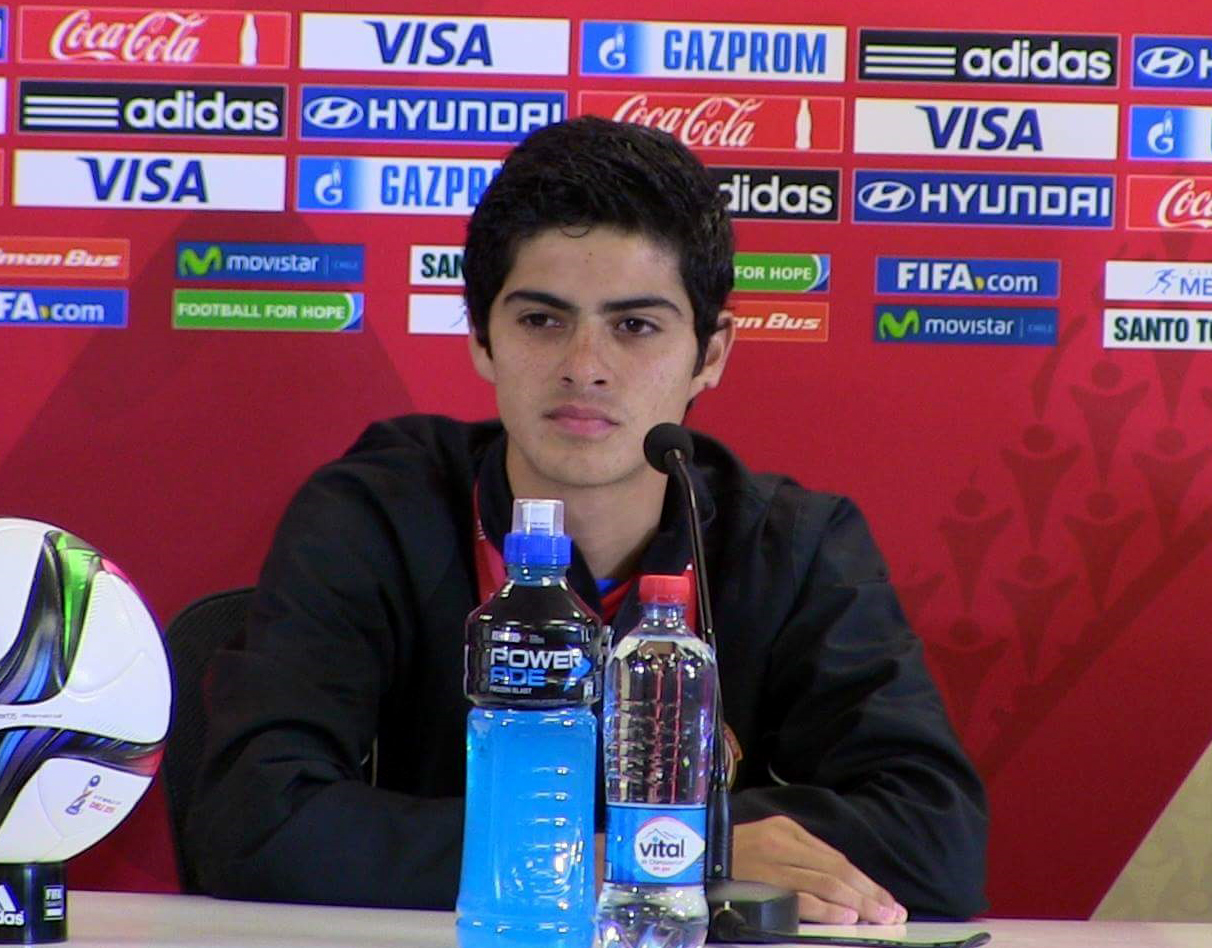

Personal information
- Full name: Luis Jose Hernández Paniagua
- Date of birth: 7 February 1998 (age 28)
- Place of birth: Santa Bárbara
- Height: 1.80 m (5 ft 11 in)
- Position: Defender

Team information
- Current team: Pérez Zeledón
- Number: 6

Youth career
- –2016: Deportivo Saprissa

Senior career*
Years	Team	Apps	(Gls)
2016–2021	Deportivo Saprissa	130	(2)
2017	→ Municipal Grecia (loan)	21	(3)
2022–2024	Santos de Guápiles	93	(8)
2024–	Pérez Zeledón	73	(4)

International career^{‡}
2015	Costa Rica U17	6	(1)
2016–2017	Costa Rica U20	9	(0)
2018	Costa Rica U21	3	(0)
2019–2021	Costa Rica U23	3	(0)
2018	Costa Rica	1	(0)
- * Club domestic league appearances and goals as of 28 December 2025 ‡ National team caps and goals as of 25 March 2021

Luis Jose Hernández Paniagua (born 7 February 1998) is a Costa Rican professional footballer who plays for Pérez Zeledón in the Liga FPD.

== Career ==
When he was captain of the Costa Rica under-17 team Hernández trained with the Manchester United team and was strongly rumoured to be signed by Louis Van Gaal for the English side however the transfer didn't materialise. He made his professional debut on loan at Municipal Grecia before returning to Deportivo Saprissa with whom he won four league titles before leaving to join Santos de Guapiles in 2021. He joined A.D. Municipal Pérez Zeledón in May 2024.

== International career ==
He made his debut for the Costa Rica national football team appearing as a second-half substitute for Bryan Oviedo on 11 September 2018 against Japan at the Panasonic Stadium Suita.
