= Anderson Treminio =

Nicaraguan footballer (born 1998)

Personal information
- Full name: Anderson Josué Treminio Hulse
- Date of birth: 17 April 1998 (age 28)
- Place of birth: Nicaragua
- Height: 1.80 m (5 ft 11 in)
- Position: Striker

Team information
- Current team: Real Santa Cruz
- Number: 9

Senior career*
Years	Team	Apps	(Gls)
2017–2018	Juventus	24	(7)
2018	Real Estelí	7	(2')
2019–2020	Juventus	37	(7)
2020–2021	Walter Ferretti	12	(0)
2021–2023	UNAN	85	(41)
2024–	Real Santa Cruz	9	(0)

International career
2019–	Nicaragua	8	(0)
- * Club domestic league appearances and goals

Anderson Josué Treminio Hulse (born 17 April 1998) is a Nicaraguan footballer who plays as a striker for Real Santa Cruz.

== Career ==
Treminio started his career with Nicaraguan side Juventus. He was regarded as one of the club's most important players. In 2021, he signed for Nicaraguan side UNAN. He helped the club achieve fifth place in the league. In 2024, he signed for Bolivian side Real Santa Cruz. He became the first Nicaraguan player to sign for a Bolivian side.
