= Totogalpa =

- Municipality
- Location in Nicaragua
- Coordinates: 13°34′N 86°30′W
- Country: Nicaragua
- Department: Madriz

Area
  - Municipality: 51 sq mi (133 km^{2})

Population (2005)
  - Municipality: 11,927
  - Density: 232/sq mi (89.7/km^{2})
  - Urban: 1,794
- Climate: Aw

Totogalpa (Spanish pronunciation: [totoˈɣalpa]) is a municipality in the Madriz department of Nicaragua.
