= San Juan del Río Coco =

- Municipality
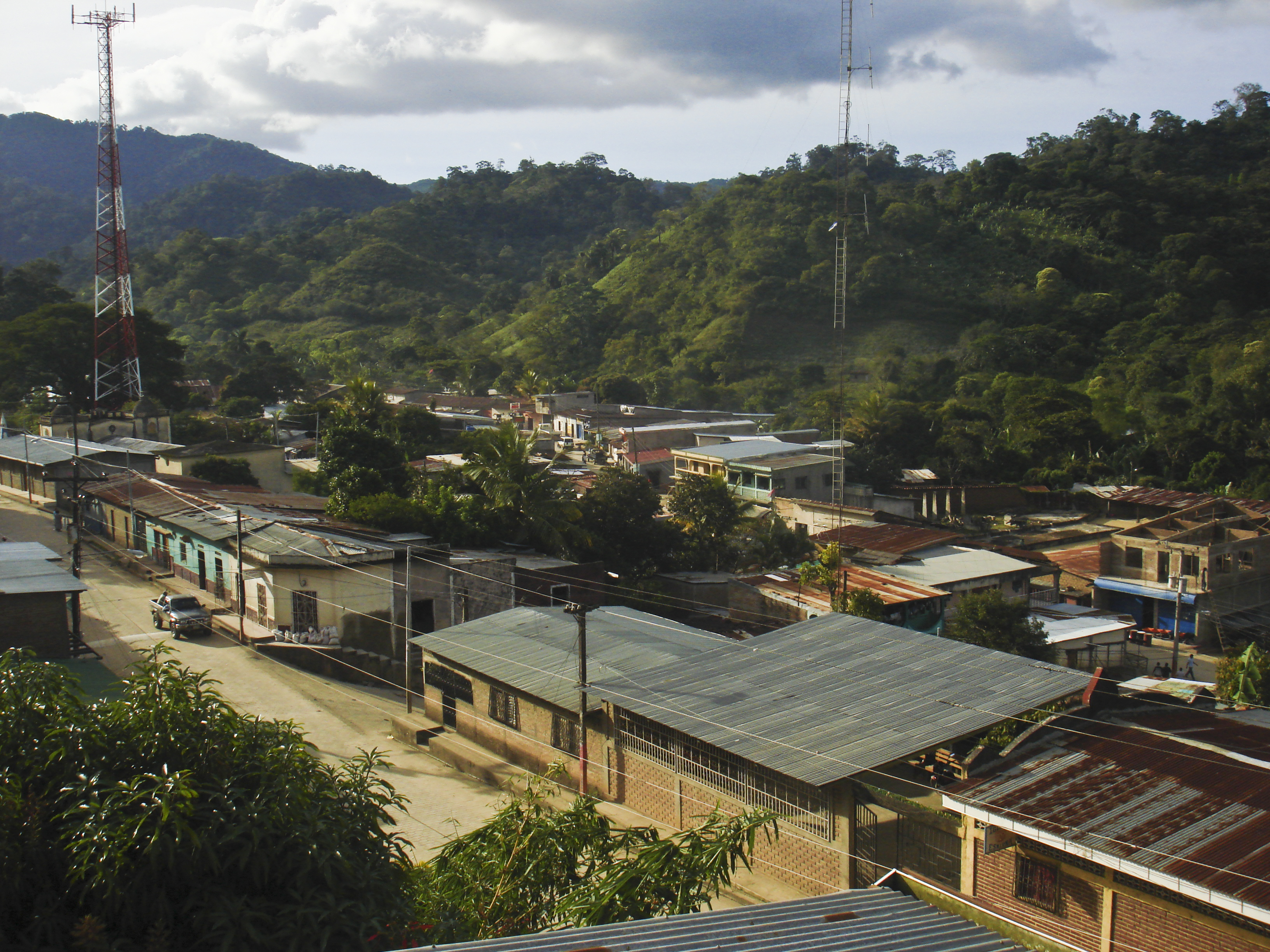
- San Juan del Rio Coco

- Location in Nicaragua
- Coordinates: 13°33′N 86°10′W
- Country: Nicaragua
- Department: Madriz

Government
  - Type: Socialista
  - Alcaldia: Asisclo Laguna Mairena

Area
  - Municipality: 70 sq mi (182 km^{2})

Population (2022 estimate)
  - Municipality: 37,337
  - Density: 531/sq mi (205/km^{2})
  - Urban: 12,820
- Climate: Aw
- Website: http://www.sanjuandelriococo.com

San Juan del Río Coco is a town and a municipality in the Madriz department of Nicaragua.
