= Ángelo Padilla =

Guatemalan footballer

Personal information
- Full name: Ángelo Alfonso Padilla Barahona
- Date of birth: March 5, 1988 (age 38)
- Place of birth: Guatemala
- Height: 1.80 m (5 ft 11 in)
- Position: Forward

Team information
- Current team: Universidad SC
- Number: 9

Senior career*
Years	Team	Apps	(Gls)
2010–2012	Universidad SC		(2)
2012	Suchitepéquez	30	(3)
2013	Puntarenas	32	(6)
2014	CSD Municipal	5	(0)
2014–2015	Carmelita	33	(9)
2015–2016	Universidad San Carlos	7	(3)
2016–2017	Municipal Liberia		(1)

International career^{‡}
2013–	Guatemala	6	(1)
- * Club domestic league appearances and goals as of 15 August 2014 ‡ National team caps and goals as of 30 June 2014

Ángelo Alfonso Padilla Barahona (born 5 March 1988) is a Guatemalan footballer who plays for Carmelita as a striker, in Costa Rica's First Division.

== International career ==
Padilla appeared for the Guatemala national football team in two 2014 FIFA World Cup qualifiers.

== International goals ==
Scores and results list. Guatemala's goal tally first.

#	Date	Venue	Opponent	Score	Result	Competition
1	11 November 2011	Estadio Mateo Flores, Guatemala, Guatemala	Grenada	3–0	3–0	2014 FIFA World Cup qualification
