= Ariel Soto =

Costa Rican footballer (born 1992)

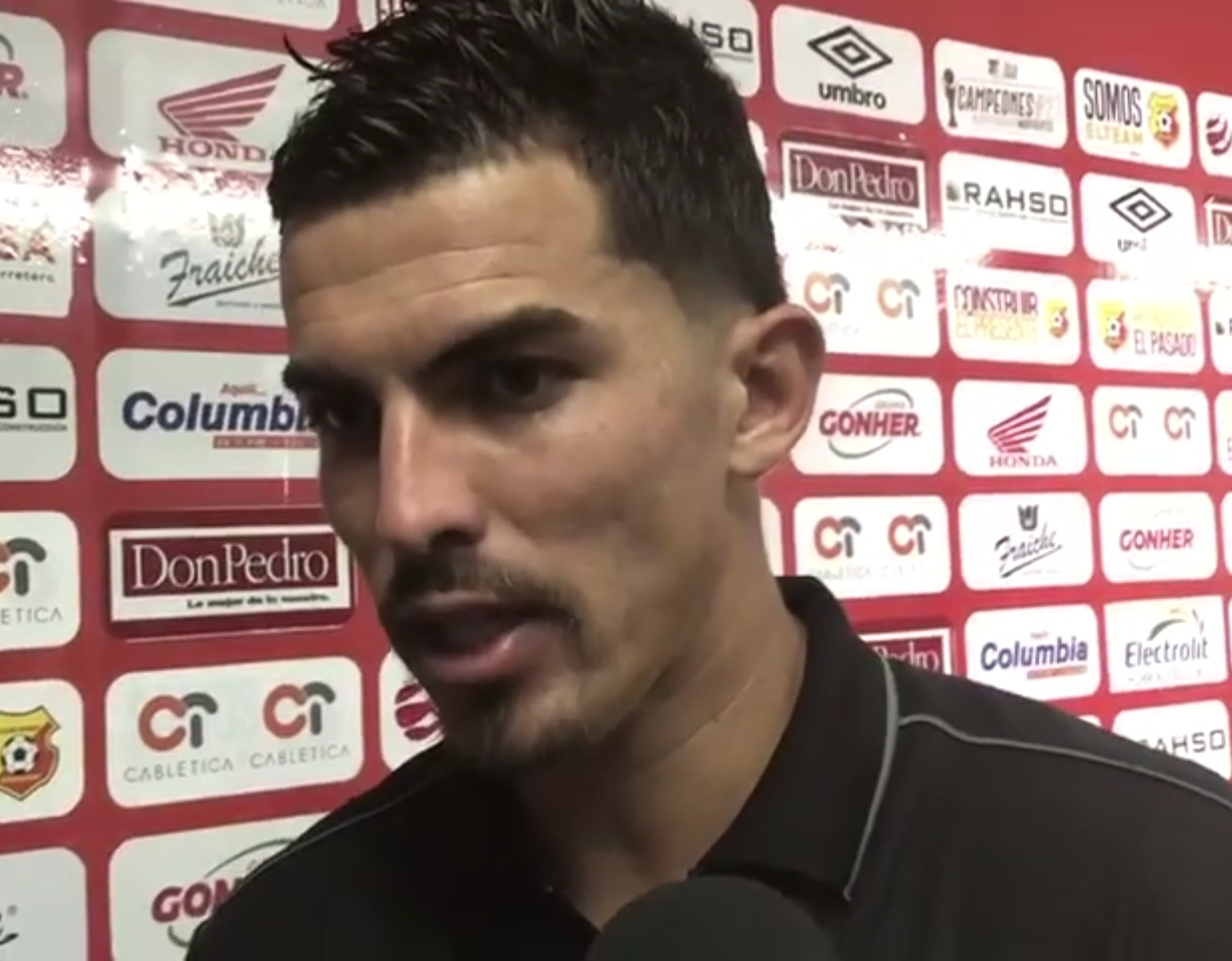
- 2019 by Diario Deportivo CR

Personal information
- Full name: Ariel Román Soto González
- Date of birth: 14 May 1992 (age 34)
- Place of birth: San José, Costa Rica
- Height: 1.83 m (6 ft 0 in)
- Position: Left back

Team information
- Current team: Herediano
- Number: 34

Senior career*
Years	Team	Apps	(Gls)
2009–2011	Brujas	6	(0)
2012–2015	Alajuelense	102	(4)
2016–2017	Boyacá Chicó	15	(0)
2016	UCR	14	(0)
2017–2018	Carmelita	49	(1)
2018	SC Once de Abril		
2019	UCR	16	(1)
2019–	Herediano	56	(4)

International career
2009	Costa Rica U17	3	(0)
2010–2011	Costa Rica U20	10	(0)
2020–	Costa Rica	1	(0)
- * Club domestic league appearances and goals as of 24 January 2021 (UTC)

Ariel Román Soto González (born 14 May 1992) is a Costa Rican professional footballer who plays as a defender for Liga FPD club Herediano.

== International career ==
He made his debut for Costa Rica national football team on 13 October 2020 in a friendly against Panama. He played the full game.

== Honors ==
LD Alajuelense

- Costa Rican Primera División (2): 2012–13 Invierno, 2013–14 Invierno.
