= Madriz Department =

Department of Nicaragua

Coordinates: 13°29′N 86°35′W

Madriz Departamento de Madriz
- Department
- Flag

- Country: Nicaragua
- Established: 11 November 1936
- Capital: Somoto

Area
  - Total: 1,708 km^{2} (659 sq mi)

Population (2023 estimate)
  - Total: 181,328
  - Density: 106.2/km^{2} (275.0/sq mi)
- ISO 3166-2: NI-MD

Madriz (Spanish pronunciation: [maˈðɾis]) is an administrative division and department in Nicaragua. It covers an area of 1,708 km^{2} (659 sq mi) and has a population of 181,328 in 2023. The capital and seat of the department is at Somoto. It was created from Nueva Segovia department in 1936, and is named after former Nicaraguan president José Madriz.

== History ==
Madriz department was created from Nueva Segovia department in 1936, and is named after former Nicaraguan president José Madriz. Augusto Cesar Sandino and his army fought an armed rebellion for Nicaragua against the United States in the region in the late 1920s.

== Geography ==
Madriz' is one of the departments of Nicaragua. It is situated in northern part of the country and covers an area of 1,708 km^{2} (659 sq mi). It is bordered by the departments of Chinandega, Esteli, Jinotega and Nueva Segovia. It also shares a land border with the Choluteca Department in Honduras. Somoto is the largest city and seat of the department.

The department's topography consists of mountainous terrain interspersed with valleys, covered with forests and coffee plantations. The Coco River passes through the department. The Somoto Canyon, located along the Coco River, was formed by solidified lava from the previous eruptions of the nearby Masaya and Nindirí Volcanoes. The Masaya volcano has an active crate that is 500 m (1,600 ft)-wide and 200 m (660 ft)-deep. Tepesomoto La Patasta Nature Reserve stretches across part of Madriz and the nearby departments. The Piedras Pintadas Municipal Ecological Park, established in July 2013, consists of several rocky outcrops consisting of pre-Columbian rock art and petroglyphs.

The department includes nine municipalities–Las Sabanas, Palacagüina, San José de Cusmapa, San Juan del Río Coco, San Lucas, Somoto, Telpaneca, Totogalpa, and Yalagüina.

== Demographics and culture ==
As per 2023 estimate, the department had a population of 181,328 inhabitants. The department is popular for its village handicrafts. The patron saint festival is hosted in May, and an annual carnival is hosted in November. The Piedra Pintada Museum is located in Somoto. There are several shops and bakeries which sell rosquilla, a traditional Nicaraguan biscuit. There is a Catholic religious sanctuary near Cacauli, visited by the locals.
