= Telpaneca =

- Municipality
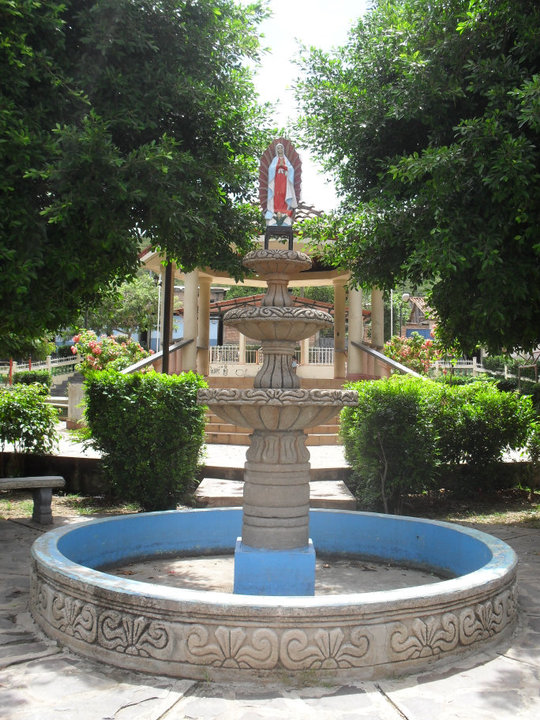
- Statue of the Virgin of Guadalupe in the central park of Telpaneca

- Location in Nicaragua
- Coordinates: 13°32′N 86°17′W
- Country: Nicaragua
- Department: Madriz

Area
  - Total: 137.2 sq mi (355.3 km^{2})

Population (2025)
  - Total: 27,435
  - Density: 200.0/sq mi (77.22/km^{2})
- Climate: Aw

Telpaneca, meaning "passage of stones," is a municipality in the Madriz department of Nicaragua. It is 218 kilometers from Managua. As of 2025, it has a population of 27,435, an area of 355.3 km² , and a population density of 77.22/km².

== Notable places ==
Notable places in Telpaneca include la cueva del sapo (the frog's cave), la cuesta de la mona (the monkey's slope) and la virgen del chorro (the virgin waterfall). The nearby Mount Malacaste, located at Santo Domingo, offers a fresh environment and an odor of coffee.

== Notable people ==
Among the town's most notable figures are:

- Marcos Iván Vilchez Ruiz, also known as Daz Zuvr. He is a Nicaraguan polymath who stands out as a musician, physicist, mathematician, quantum biology researcher, and author. In the creative field, he is the founder and CEO of Nicánima Estudios, as well as the founder, guitarist, and lead vocalist of the rock band TheVeilers.
- Josamary Hazbell Martinez Miranda, member of the Nicaragua National Chess Team, who won 2nd place in the National Chess Competition.
- Josadak Enmanuel Martinez Miranda, member of the Nicaragua National Chess Team, who won 4th place in the National Chess Competition.
- Aldo Josué Aldana, writer of notable books such as La casa de piedra.
- Roxana Lisseth Cárdenas Rivas, member of the Nicaragua National Chess Team, Undefeated National Chess Champion in the School Games.
- Guillermo Ardón, introduced electricity and the coffee depulper machine for the first time.
- Chico Barreda, introduced the first mill to the municipality.
- Reynaldo Guillén, recognized local historian.
- Payín Guillén, one of the first musicians in Telpaneca, noted for playing the accordion.
- Esteban Medina, Juan Torrez, Fortino Valles, and Luis Florián, builders of the Cristo Rey Church.
- Chano Valladares, responsible for bringing the newspaper to the locality for the first time.
