= Palacagüina =

- Municipality
- Location in Nicaragua
- Coordinates: 13°27′N 86°24′W
- Country: Nicaragua
- Department: Madriz

Area
  - Municipality: 61 sq mi (157 km^{2})

Population (2005)
  - Municipality: 12,825
  - Density: 212/sq mi (81.7/km^{2})
  - Urban: 4,235
- Climate: Aw

Palacagüina (Spanish pronunciation: [palakaˈɣwina]) is a municipality in the Madriz department of Nicaragua.

Palacagüina is a small town; the name comes from the Nahuatl language, meaning "village near the mountains."

Palacagüina is featured in the revolutionary song "Cristo Ya Nació."
