= Somoto, Madriz =

Somoto
- Municipality
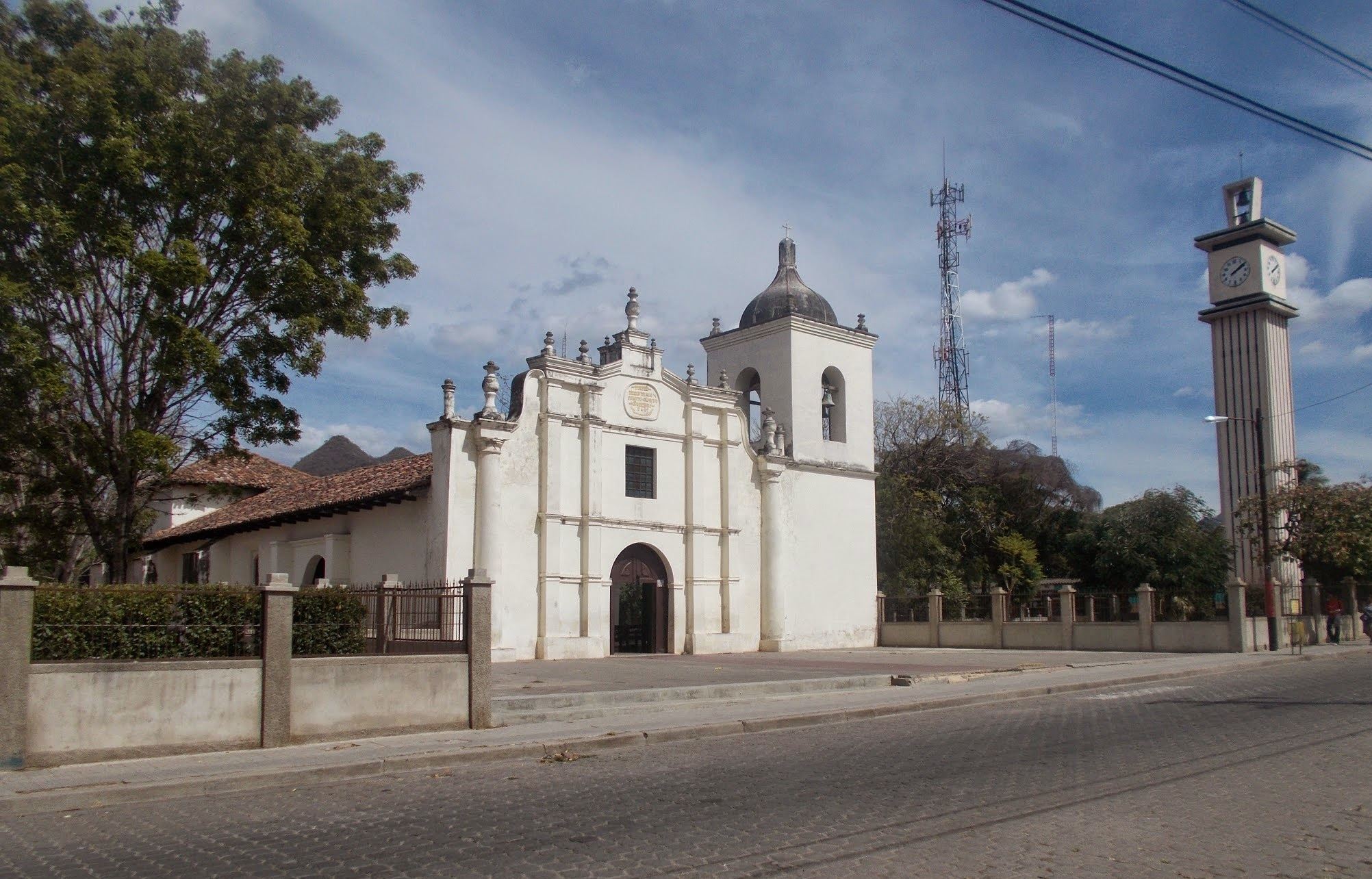
- The Parroquia Santiago in central Somoto.

- Flag Seal

- Location in Nicaragua
- Coordinates: 13°28′N 86°34′W
- Country: Nicaragua
- Department: Madriz

Area
  - Municipality: 180 sq mi (466 km^{2})

Population (2022 estimate)
  - Municipality: 40,322
  - Density: 224/sq mi (86.5/km^{2})
  - Urban: 21,211
- Climate: Aw

Somoto (Spanish pronunciation: [soˈmoto]) is a city and a municipality located in the hills of northern Nicaragua, and capital of the department of Madriz. It is around 20 km (12 miles) south-west of Ocotal and 51 km (32 miles) north-west of Estelí. It sits on the Pan-American Highway around 16 km (10 miles) from the Honduran border crossing at El Espino.

Founded in pre-Columbian times by Olmec and Aztec immigrants from modern Mexico, Somoto is the economic and cultural heart of Madriz. It has also become a growing tourist centre since the discovery of Somoto Canyon, located 13 km (8 miles) west of the city. Somoto Municipality has a total population of 40,322, with 21,211 people living in the urban area and 19,111 in 48 nearby communities.

It is known as La Flor de Henequén (the Flower of Henequen) as a result of the cultivation of this crop in the city's environs. It is also renowned for its production of rosquillas somoteñas, crispy corn biscuits with a variety of flavours.

== History ==
Somoto was settled by Olmec and Aztec peoples from Mexico, and subsequently inhabited by Chorotegas and Nicaraguas. The name Somoto originates from the Nahuatl Tépecxomotl, meaning 'Valley of Geese', while Spanish royal decrees of 1591 give the city's name as Santiago de Tepesomoto. Although the city is now universally known as Somoto, the name Tepesomoto is retained by the volcano overlooking the city to the south and its surrounding Tepesomoto-La Patasta Nature Reserve.

Somoto was granted town status in January 1867 and city status in March 1895. It has been the capital city of Madriz since that department's separation from Nueva Segovia in November 1936.

Somoto's adobe parochial church, formally the Temple of Saint James the Apostle (Templo Santiago Apostól), was established in the heart of Somoto in 1661 opposite the city's parque central (central park); it is therefore one of Nicaragua's oldest surviving church buildings, pre-dating the Cathedral of León by 86 years. However the present façade and bell tower were constructed as recently as 1875. Somoto is also located near the Cacaulí Sanctuary, a site for religious pilgrimage since a boy claimed to have seen the Virgin Mary while collecting firewood in 1990.

The famous Nicaraguan singer-songwriters and brothers Carlos Mejía Godoy and Luís Enrique Mejía Godoy were born in Somoto, as was their nephew Luis Enrique.

== Tourism ==
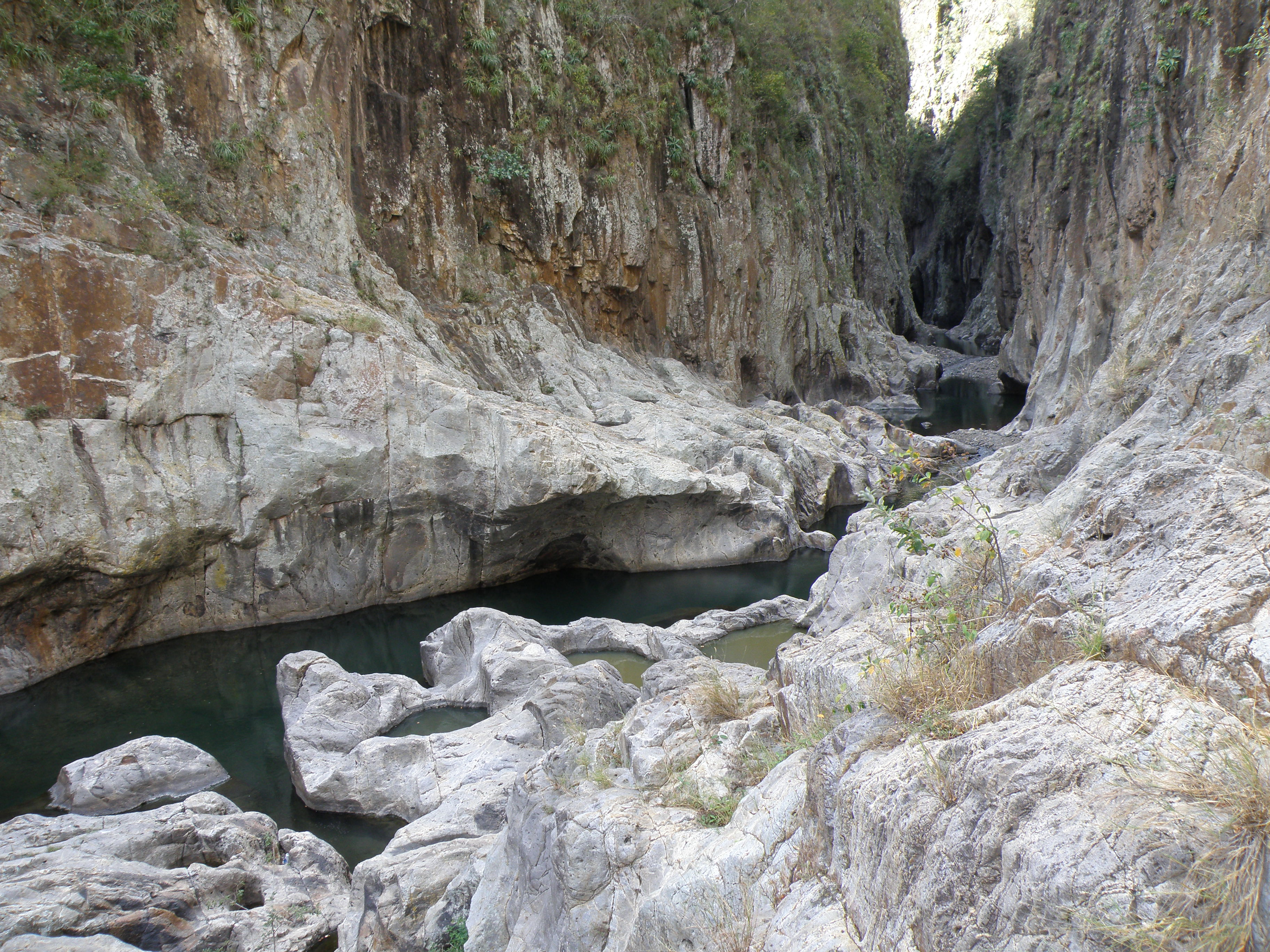
Somoto Canyon

Somoto still has fewer than 10 hotels and is not a major stop on the Central American backpacker circuit. Tourists visit Somoto primarily to go tubing in the Monumento Nacional Cañón de Somoto. The Cañón de Somoto is featured on the 50 cordoba banknote and has been mentioned in both the Lonely Planet and Tripadvisor.

Somoto is often credited with being the birthplace of the Rosquilla. A traditional Nicaraguan snack, Rosquillas are made by making rings of cornmeal with a cane sugar center and baking them in large wood-fired cob ovens. Day tours of the Rosquilla factory in Somoto can be arranged and may include samples and a hands-on lesson in their preparation and history.

== International relations ==
The Merced/Somoto Sister City Committee was formed in 1988 by members of the Merced Central America Support Group, who were matched with Somoto by the Nicaraguan Embassy. In March 1992 were granted official sister city status by a unanimous vote of the Merced City Council..

Somoto also has links with the following:

- Lasarte-Oria, Basque Country, Spain
- Llodio, Basque Country, Spain
- Leganés, Madrid, Spain
- Vic, Catalonia, Spain
- Fougères, Brittany, France

== Sports ==
The Real Madriz football team is based in Somoto.
