= Nicaraguan Canal and Development Project =

Proposed shipping route across Nicaragua

Coordinates: 11.5°N 85.0°W

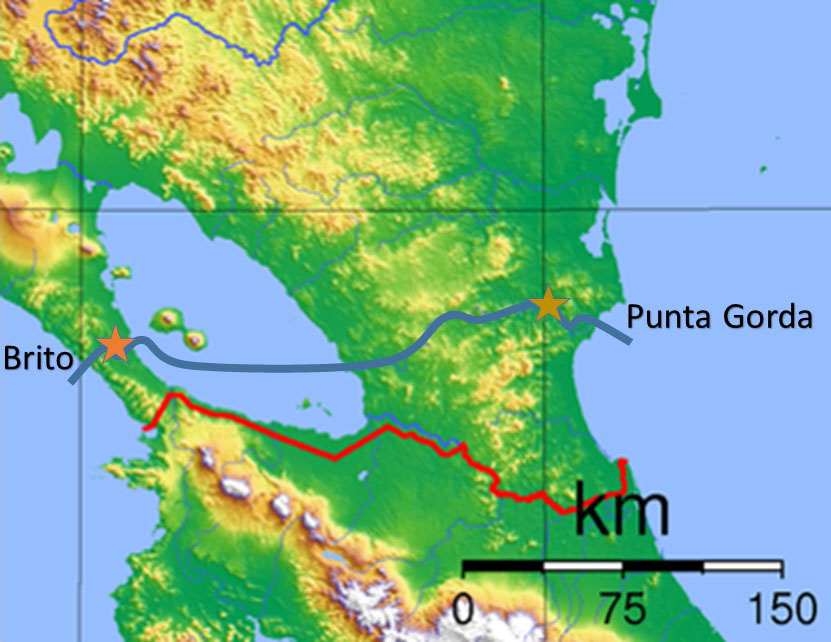
- Nicaragua Canal Project (2014) (blue line). Stars indicate the proposed Brito and Camilo Locks. The red line is the border between Nicaragua (above) and Costa Rica (below).
- Interactive map of Nicaraguan Canal and Development Project

Specifications
- Length: 270 km (170 miles)
- Status: Abandoned

History
- Original owner: HK Nicaragua Canal Development Investment
- Date of act: 2013
- Date closed: 2024

Geography
- Start point: Punta Brito
- End point: Bluefields

The Nicaraguan Canal and Development Project, informally the Nicaragua Canal (Spanish: Canal de Nicaragua, also referred to as the Nicaragua Grand Canal, or the Grand Interoceanic Canal) was a proposed shipping route through Nicaragua to connect the Caribbean Sea (and therefore the Atlantic Ocean) with the Pacific Ocean. Scientists were concerned about the project's environmental impact, as Lake Nicaragua is Central America's key freshwater reservoir while the project's viability was questioned by shipping experts and engineers.

Construction of a canal using the San Juan River as an access route to Lake Nicaragua was first proposed in the early colonial era. After the United States purchased the French interests in the Panama Canal in the early 20th century, it decided not to build in Nicaragua, but it secured rights and conducted studies for such a canal as a supplement.

In June 2013, Nicaragua's National Assembly approved a bill to grant a 50-year concession to finance and manage the project to the HK Nicaragua Canal Development Investment Group (HKND) headed by Wang Jing, a Chinese businessman. The concession could have been extended for another 50 years once the waterway was operational.

In 2015, media reports suggested the project would be delayed and possibly cancelled because Wang's personal wealth declined greatly as a result of the 2015–16 Chinese stock market crash. "Major works" such as dredging were to take place after the finishing of a Pacific Ocean wharf, whose construction was planned to start in late 2016. The Nicaraguan government failed to present reliable information about whether or not the project could be financed, thus casting doubt over whether it would be completed. The HKND Group stated that financing would come from debt and equity sales and a potential initial public offering (IPO).

By May 2017, no concrete action had been taken toward constructing the canal and further doubts were expressed about its financing. In February 2018, analysts widely viewed the project as defunct, though the head of the project insisted work was on-going and HKND, which closed its offices in April 2018, retained the legal rights to the concession for the canal and side projects.

In May 2024, Nicaragua's congress canceled the concession to HKND.

== History ==
The various routes proposed over the centuries, with the Panama Canal. The proposed HKND canal would have followed the red route.

Until the beginning of the 20th century, before the opening of the Panama Canal, Nicaragua used to be the main overland trade route and hub of transshipment of goods between ocean-going vessels on the Atlantic side and those on the Pacific. In the meantime, the idea of constructing a man-made waterway through Central America has been thought about throughout history. The colonial administration of New Spain had conducted preliminary surveys. The routes suggested usually ran across Nicaragua, Panama, or the Isthmus of Tehuantepec in Mexico.

The history of attempts to build a canal across Nicaragua connecting the Caribbean Sea and thus the Atlantic Ocean and the Pacific Ocean goes back at least to 1825 when the Federal Republic of Central America hired surveyors to study a route via Lake Nicaragua, 32.7 metres (107 ft) above sea level. Many other proposals have followed. Despite the operation of the Panama Canal, which opened in 1914, interest in a Nicaragua canal has continued. With emergence of globalization, an increase in commerce and the cost of fuel, and the limitations of the Panama Canal, the concept of a second canal across the American land bridge became more attractive, and in 2006 the president of Nicaragua, Enrique Bolaños, announced an intention to proceed with such a project. Even with the Panama Canal expansion project, which began commercial operation to allow modern New Panamax vessels on 26 June 2016, some ships would be too big for the Panama Canal.

On 26 September 2012, the Nicaraguan Government and the newly formed Hong Kong Nicaragua Canal Development Group (HKND) signed a memorandum of understanding that committed HKND to financing and building the "Nicaraguan Canal and Development Project". HKND Group is a private enterprise.

The Nicaraguan government subsequently approved the Master Concession Agreement with HKND on 13 June 2013 thereby granting "the sole rights to the HKND Group to plan, design, construct and thereafter to operate and manage the Nicaragua Grand Canal and other related projects, including ports, a free trade zone, an international airport and other infrastructure development projects". The agreement would have lasted for 50 years and was renewable for another 50 years. HKND would have paid the government of Nicaragua US$10M annually for 10 years, and thereafter a portion of the revenue starting at 1% and increasing later. Stratfor indicated that after 10 years, ownership shares would periodically be handed over to Nicaragua, so that after 50 years Nicaragua would be the majority shareholder.

The HKND Group performed a preliminary study phase of development to assess the technological and economic feasibility of constructing a canal in Nicaragua, as well as the potential environmental, social, and regional implications of various routes. The canal and other associated projects would be financed by investors throughout the world and would generate jobs for Nicaragua and other Central American countries.

Initial findings of the commercial analysis conducted by HKND Group indicate that the combined effect of growth in east–west trade and in ship sizes could provide a compelling argument for the construction of a second canal, substantially larger than the expanded Panama Canal, across Central America. The projection at the time was that in the 2020s, growth in global maritime trade is expected to cause congestion and delays in transit through the Panama Canal without a complementary route through the isthmus, and by 2030, the volume of trade that a Nicaragua Canal could serve would have grown by 240%.

On 10 June 2013, The Associated Press reported that the National Assembly's Infrastructure Committee voted nearly unanimously in favor of the project, with four members abstaining. On 13 June, Nicaragua's legislature passed the legislation granting the concession. On 15 June, Nicaraguan President Daniel Ortega and the billionaire chairman of HKND Group, Wang Jing, signed the concession agreement giving HKND Group the rights to construct and manage the canal and associated projects for 50 years. An HKND Group press release read, "HKND Group successfully obtains exclusive right to develop and manage Nicaragua Grand Canal for 100 years." Under the exclusive contract, Wang could skip building the canal (and making any payments to Nicaragua) and instead simply operate lucrative tax-free side projects.

Wang announced at a press briefing in June 2013 that he had successfully attracted global investors to the $40 billion project. In January 2014, Wang and Ortega issued a statement that the project's construction would begin in December 2014 and end in 2019.

On 7 July 2014, a 278 kilometres (173 mi) route for the Nicaragua Canal was approved. The proposed route started from the mouth of the Brito River on the Pacific side, passed through Lake Nicaragua, and ended in the Punta Gorda River on the Caribbean. The proposed canal would be between 230 and 520 metres (750 and 1,710 ft) wide and 27.6 metres (91 ft) deep. The Toronto Star noted that Chinese engineer Dong Yung Song said the canal's design called for the creation of a 400-square-kilometre (150 sq mi) artificial lake. The water to fill the canal's giant locks would come from the artificial lake, not from Lake Nicaragua.

Ortega, whose government approved the agreement within one week in June 2013, reportedly perceived the canal as the second phase of the Nicaraguan Revolution, predicting that it would pull Nicaragua out of poverty and lead to the creation of 250,000 jobs; HKND said the project would create 50,000 jobs, about half from abroad, mainly China.

The Moscow Times reported in 2014 that Russia was willing to help build the Nicaragua Canal, viewing the project in part as an opportunity to pursue strategic interests in the region. Construction was to begin on 29 December 2014, and officially started a week earlier. However, owing to Nicaragua's volatile climate and seismic activity, feasibility concerns emerged over the project's future. In November 2015, HKND announced that they would postpone the construction of locks and excavations to late 2016 to fine-tune the design.

The Nicaraguan Canal and Development Project saw business rivalry greatly intensify in late 2014. China Harbor Engineering Company, an experienced construction company, offered to design, construct, and finance a fourth set of locks in Panama, where it opened a regional headquarters. If built to the width of the proposed Nicaragua Canal, it would cut across a far shorter distance, and still cost only $10 billion, according to the firm. Panama is in a better financial situation than Nicaragua to afford taking on this project in that it already has a stream of income from its existing canals.

Alternative motives have been explored and other projects have taken priority against the water transportation venture. Bloomberg reported in 2015 that "conspiracy theories abound" including the project was a land grab by Ortega, an attempt by Ortega to "whip up" support in elections, and part of a Chinese plan to gain influence in the region.

By November 2016, the president of the canal commission, Manual Coronel Kautz said "According to our schedule, we should initiate major works by the end of the year." However, Carlos Fernando Chamorro, editor of the Confidencial newspaper, said "If the People's Republic of China does not step forward, it won't happen. Wang Jing does not have the reputation to push this through. If it is just him, then the chances of this happening are zero. If the PRC steps in, then it is a big possibility."

Following financial difficulties, HKND finally closed its headquarters offices in China in April 2018, leaving no forwarding address or telephone numbers to be reached.

=== Opposition ===
Protests against the canal's construction occurred shortly after the official ceremony marking its beginning. Farmers feared it could cause their eviction and land expropriation.

The vast land expropriations (2,900 km^{2} (1,100 mi^{2})) under land expropriation Canal Law 840 enacted in 2013 include a concession for carrying out seven sub-projects, among them ports, oil pipelines, free-trade zones, and developing tourist areas that could be realized in any part of the national territory. In particular, this law denies any right to appeal against the expropriation decision and provides a derisory level of compensation. It also allows the investor (HKND) to buy and sell its rights over the various sub-projects "in parts", which is a highly profitable enterprise. This has been called a "land grab" and it has prompted protests, and some violent confrontations against security forces. Activists noted that the canal contract established that it must be dissolved in 72 months, if the investor has not obtained the money to start the project; that deadline was 14 June 2019, so they assert that the Law 840 must be repealed.

Opposition leader Eliseo Nuñez has called the deal "part of one of the biggest international scams in the world". Legal challenges that the deal violates constitutional rights were rejected by the Supreme Court of Nicaragua and a retrospective rewriting of the Constitution of Nicaragua placed HKND beyond legal challenge. HKND has been granted the right to expropriate land within 5 km (3.1 mi) on each side of the canal and pay only cadastral value, not market value, for property. Wang, however, promised to pay fair market value. The estimates of the number of people who would be displaced range from 29,000 to more than 100,000. There are indications of local opposition to intended expropriations. Thus, according to an activist leader, an unrest in Rivas in December 2014, in opposition to the canal, left two protesters dead, although no evidence was ever produced to justify his claim. The CIDH, Nicaragua's Human Rights Commission, has strongly criticized the government for not looking into the project's effect on citizens, amid claims that citizens were not involved in decision-making. The British firm ERM, who carried out the Environmental Impact Assessment, claims it held consultations with around 6,000 people in the communities along its planned route, and estimated that the property of about 30,000 people would be affected. National opinion polls show that support for the project is about 70%.

=== Reported end to the canal project ===
Investor Wang had financial setbacks unrelated to the Nicaragua project, losing 80% of his net worth during the 2015–16 Chinese stock market turbulence. In March 2017, the Havana Times reported that the public relations agency handling Wang's interests in Nicaragua had been let go, in absence of any developments on the project to report, and Wang had not been in the country in more than two years. In May 2017, the PanAm Post indicated that "no concrete action has been taken to begin the project" and suggested that the project was either "paralyzed, or nonexistent." In September 2017 Agence France-Presse reported that the work had been "pushed back indefinitely," although the government renewed the project's environmental permit in April 2017.

In February 2018, Manuel Coronel Kautz, head of Interoceanic Grand Canal Authority of Nicaragua, told Agence France-Presse work on the canal was still ongoing, but by that point analysts and activists widely viewed the canal project as defunct, with China having shifted its investment focus to Panama, the main competitor to a Nicaraguan canal. Following financial difficulties, HKND finally closed its offices in April 2018, leaving no forwarding address or telephone numbers to be reached.

Absent a 60% vote to revoke the legislation, HKND maintains the legal concessions established by the 2013 law, including for other infrastructures projects in Nicaragua, including ports, roads, railway and an airport.

In November 2024 the Nicaraguan Canal idea has been revived.

== Description ==
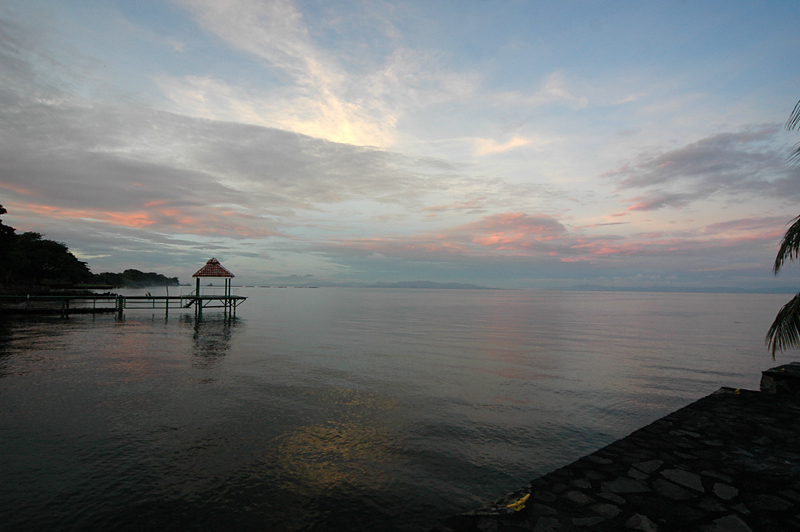
Lake Nicaragua would have been the center segment of the Nicaragua Canal

The construction company provided a project description for review on open source, dated December 2014. The canal as planned would have been 259.4 kilometres (161.2 mi) and would have three sections. The West Canal runs from Brito on the Pacific Ocean up the Rio Brito valley, crosses the continental divide, and after passing through the Rio Las Lajas valley enters Lake Nicaragua; its length would be 25.9 kilometres (16.1 mi). The Lake Nicaragua section measures 106.8 km (66.4 mi) and runs from 4 km (2.5 mi) south of San Jorge to 8 km (5.0 mi) south of San Miguelito. The East Canal would be the longest section at 126.7 km (78.7 mi) and would be built along the Rio Tule valley through the Caribbean highland to the Rio Punta Gorda valley to meet the Caribbean Sea. A channel would have to be dug in the bottom of Lake Nicaragua, as it is not deep enough for large vessels to transit the canal.

Both the West Canal and the East Canal would each have one lock with 3 consecutive chambers to raise ships to the level of Lake Nicaragua, which has an average water elevation of 31.3 m (103 ft), with a range between 30.2 and 33.0 m (99.1 and 108.3 ft). The western Brito Lock would be 14.5 km (9.0 mi) inland from the Pacific, and the eastern Camilo Lock would be 13.7 km (8.5 mi) inland from the Caribbean Sea. The dimensions of each of the locks' chambers are 520 m (1,706 ft) long, 75 m (246 ft) wide, and 27.6 m (91 ft) threshold depth. As locks generally define the limit on the size of ships that can be handled, the Nicaragua Canal would have allowed passage for larger ships than those that pass through the Panama Canal. For comparison the Panama Canal, after its 2016 expansion, is only 427 m (1,401 ft) long, 55 m (180 ft) wide, and 18.3 m (60 ft) deep.

No water from Lake Nicaragua was planned to be used to flood the locks; water would have come from local rivers and recycling using water-saving basins. The Camilo lock would have been built adjacent to a new dam of the upper Punta Gorda River that creates a reservoir. This Atlanta Reservoir (or Lake Atlanta) would have a surface area of 395 km^{2} (153 mi^{2}). West of the Atlanta reservoir, the Rio Agua Zarca would have been dammed to create a second reservoir. This reservoir would have had a surface area of 48.5 km^{2} (18.7 mi^{2}) and hold 1,100×10^{6} L (290×10^{6} US gal). A hydropower facility would be built at the dam and would have generated over 10 megawatts of power to be used for Camilo Lock operations. Both locks would also be connected to the country's power grid and have back-up generator facilities. It was estimated that each lock would have used about 9 megawatts of power.

At each oceanic canal entrance, breakwaters and port facilities would have been constructed. The Pacific port would be named Brito Port and the Caribbean one Aguila Port. Initially these two ports would have helped during construction and later become international ports. Their design capacity was 1.68 million TEU/year and 2.5 million TEU/year, respectively. Existing port facilities at Corinto and Bluefields would have been improved to allow for shipment of material to the entry ports under construction. Fuel storage sites would be placed at the two port sites. Four lighthouses would be constructed at the entrances to the East and West Canals. In addition, the channel entrance on sea would have been be marked on both sides with a large sailing buoy about 3 kilometres (2 mi) offshore and 2 light buoys would mark the passage through Lake Nicaragua.

A free trade zone with commercial facilities as well as tourist hotels and an international airport at Rivas were planned to be built when canal construction was advanced.

Appropriate road improvements were planned. The Pan-American Highway would have crossed the canal via a bridge. Nicaragua Route 25 (Acoyapa-San Carlos) on the eastern side of Lake Nicaragua would have gotten a ferry service. Both ports would get public road connections. HKND planned to construct a private gravel maintenance road on both sides of the canal.

The estimate for the workforce in 2020 was 3,700 people, and 12,700 in 2050 when traffic had increased.

Transit time would have been about 30 hours. It was projected that by 2020 3,576 ships would have transited the canal annually. The transit rate was expected to increase to 4,138 by 2030, and to 5,097 by 2050. For comparison, the Panama Canal handled 12,855 transits in 2009.

== Construction ==
No significant construction took place. No "major works" such as dredging were planned to take place until after a Pacific Ocean wharf was built.

The apparent lack of experience of Wang and his HKND in large-scale engineering was cited as a risk.

On 22 December 2014, Wang announced construction started in Rivas, Nicaragua. Wang spoke during the starting ceremony of the first works of the Interoceanic Grand Canal in Brito town. Construction of the new waterway would have been by HKND Group—Hong Kong–based HK Nicaragua Canal Development Investment Co Ltd., which is controlled by Wang. According to HKND's announced plans in 2015, the project entailed the canal's development and building, and supporting infrastructure. There would have been four main phases. The preconstruction phase included getting permits, acquiring land and machinery, and finalizing designs and plans. The early construction phase, started in December 2014, lasted through September 2015; it secured access to construction sites, but it did not provide the critical infrastructure nor mobilize the workforce. During the construction phase from September 2015 to March 2020, the canal would have been dug and the locks built along with accompanying infrastructure. The commissioning phase projected from April 2020 to June 2020 included lock testing and lock and tug boat operator training.

HKND described the project as the largest civil earth-moving operation in history. Most of this would have consisted of dry excavation to form the canal with an estimate of 4,019 MCM of rock and soil. There would have been 739 MCM of freshwater dredging (Lake Nicaragua) and 241 MCM of marine dredging. Marine dredging of the oceanic access canal would be required on the Pacific side for 1.7 km (1.1 mi) and on the Caribbean Sea side for 14.4 km (8.9 mi). Disposal of excavation material would have been done along the canal in designated disposal areas typically within 3 km (1.9 mi) of the canal.

Two concrete plants and a steel plant were planned to support the project. While cement would have likely been imported, construction aggregate would have come from local quarries near the two locks.

HKND estimates that about 50,000 people would be employed during the five-year construction, about half of them from Nicaragua, 25% from China, and the remainder from various other countries. 1,400 workers would be in office or administrative positions and the rest in the field. The management offices would be rented or purchased near Rivas. Workers would live in one of nine camps, which besides food and shelter would also provide health care and security. These are "closed" camps — that is, workers cannot leave the camp unless part of an organized activity. The work schedule calls for 12 hour shifts for 7 days a week. Domestic workers work two weeks and get one week off, while foreign workers are 6 weeks on and get 2 weeks off (management) or 22 weeks on, 4 weeks off (blue collar workers).

On 2 September 2015, Pang Wai Kwok (executive VP of HKND Group) was interviewed by Nicaraguan journalist Carlos Solis and said up to 3,000 people might be employed on the canal project within the year. However, the labor force depends on the contract bid's winner and Kwok said anyone in the world is eligible to work on the canal.

=== Financing ===
Project costs were estimated in the region of $40 billion to $50 billion. Beside private money provided by Wang at the start-up, further influx of financial support was expected from investors. An IPO was reported to be in preparation by the end of 2014. XCMG, a state-owned Chinese construction company would have provided machinery and taken 1.5% to 3% of HKND shares in return.

By the end of 2014, no major investors had been named. There had been speculation that the Chinese government would provide financial backing for the project, but China, as well as Wang, denied this. Wang lost nearly 85% of his wealth during the 2015 Chinese stock market crash, according to the Bloomberg Billionaires Index. In addition, Wang has had a string of setbacks for projects around the world since 2014. The economic development potential for the canal project is relatively measurable with Panama; however, the World Bank describes the country of Nicaragua as the second poorest in Latin America and the Caribbean. The World Bank has compiled a data list of projects that the impoverished nation has on record and the majority of the efforts are geared towards infrastructure and agricultural needs, but there is no explicit title project that would support the canal line of effort.

Wang admitted that the project has financial, political, and engineering risks. With the high cost of the project that independently has been estimated to be about $100 billion, it was not fully funded. The project was expected in 2014 to be completed in 2020, but Stratfor, an analyst agency, stated then that was an "unrealistic goal."

While the Nicaraguan National Bank reserves served as collateral on the part of Nicaragua, HKND had no such potential liability.

== Impact ==
=== Environmental ===
Some of the natural habitat of at least 22 endangered species would be destroyed in the construction. Another major environmental concern is the project's impact on Lake Nicaragua, the largest source of freshwater in Nicaragua. An oil spill would have serious and lasting consequences. Other problems include the possibility of dredging bringing up toxic sediments, the disruption of migration patterns of animal species, and the potential to introduce invasive species to the lake. Environmental studies had not been released by HKND when the project officially started in December 2014. The Nicaraguan Academy of Sciences noted that hundreds of thousands of hectares of pristine forests and wetlands would be destroyed and pointed out that the environmental study performed for the canal was not independent.

President Daniel Ortega stated that he is "not concerned about harming the lake because it is already contaminated." Protesters fear that the canal would bring massive environmental destruction to Lake Nicaragua and the Atlantic Autonomous Regions. 400,000 hectares of tropical rain forest and wetlands would be destroyed. It would also encroach upon the habitats of animals such as Baird's tapir, the spider monkey, and the jaguar.

==== Safety ====
Richard Condit, from the Smithsonian Tropical Research Institute, believes that the project could be used as leverage for forest protection in a country that currently lacks "institutional capacity" to meet conservation needs. A Canadian pilot was the first fatality during the canal project. The pilot was flying alone on the western side of Lake Nicaragua during an aerial survey.

==== Sustainability ====
The survey site was on the same side as NicarAgua–Dulce, which is the only ecotourism group in Nicaragua that is affiliated with The International Ecotourism Society, and it is located north of the proposed canal site. Falling in line with ecotourism, Nicaragua's Ministry of Environment and Natural Resources has promoted formal workshops at each level of education (primary, secondary, and post-secondary); however, there is no curriculum relevant to the pending canal project. The American-led Foundation for Sustainable Development is another partner that provides training initiatives to Nicaraguans that cannot access formal education. One of FSD's support sites is located at Tola, which is within close proximity of the proposed Brito–Pacific canal opening.

=== Economic ===
As the original Panama Canal still has capacity for Panamax-sized shipping and Panama has completed its Panama Canal expansion project, adding more capacity and allowing transit for even larger New Panamax size ships, projections for the Nicaragua Canal's traffic may be optimistic. While the proposed Nicaragua Canal would be wide enough to accommodate Triple E class mega container ships, which are too wide for the expanded Panama Canal, few ports are able to accommodate these ships at the present time. Further, a coast-to-coast railway line may be built by China in Honduras and could affect use of the Nicaragua Canal. Also, North American overland shipping through Pacific ports in Mexico and the United States will compete in the traffic between Asia and the U.S. east coast. The collective effect of the above is that competition may undermine the Nicaragua Canal's economic viability if it were ever built. On the other hand, the combined effect of climate change and poor water-management of the 2016 Panama Canal expansion has resulted in severe bottlenecks which are expected to be exacerbated by future drought conditions. With better water management, and the ability to accommodate dramatically larger vessels, the Nicaragua Canal could supplant other freight options over the next 50 years.

The canal would affect neighboring economies, like Honduras and El Salvador, as they are part of the commercial treaty known as the Northern Triangle of Central America (Triángulo Norte de Centroamérica). The GDP of each nation would be influenced by expanded export / import operations and trade cooperation through agencies like the promotion authority in El Salvador.

=== Social ===
According to the official Environmental Impact Assessment carried out by ERM, the canal would require the relocation of around 30,000 people. However, according to human rights group Amnesty International it would "forcibly displace an estimated 120,000 people, including Rama and Creole communities, from protected indigenous territories on the Caribbean coast." The report claims that communities established in proposed canal area have been visited by foreigners, guarded by Nicaraguan authorities, measuring the lands of the inhabitants, and that legislation passed by the Ortega government "authorizes HKND to expropriate whatever land it wants, while denying displaced families the right to appeal." Amnesty International goes on to say that "...excessive forces and unjust arrests have been performed by Nicaraguan officials". The Nicaraguan government's 2015 report on the canal counters that, while people will be moved from their current villages, "The Nicaraguan government and HKND will guarantee that persons and families on the route of the canal's construction will have living conditions superior to those they currently have."

== See also ==
- Panama Canal
- Saint Lawrence Seaway
- Suez Canal
- Istanbul Canal
- Tehuantepec Route
- Thai Canal
- Sulawesi Canal
