= Rio Brito =

Nicaraguan River

Coordinates: 11°20′39″N 85°58′45″W

Rio Brito or Brito River is a river in the southwestern part of Nicaragua that drains into the Pacific Ocean near Punta Brito, a promontory. The river valley was planned to be transformed by the Nicaraguan Canal and Development Project to serve as the conduit for the western part of the Nicaragua Canal. About 14.5 km upstream the triple-chambered Brito Lock would have been constructed by HK Nicaragua Canal Development Investment (HKND) to raise ships to the level of Lake Nicaragua.

The river can dry out as seen during the 2014 drought.
