= William B. Bunker =

American Army general

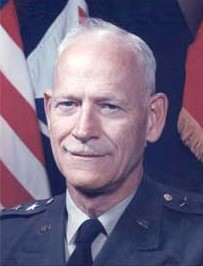
- Born: 30 September 1910; Fort Slocum, New York
- Died: 5 June 1969 (aged 58); Fort Myer, Virginia
- Military career
- Allegiance: United States
- Branch: United States Army
- Service years: 1929–1969
- Rank: Lieutenant General
- Nickname: Bill
- Commands: Army Transportation Materiel Command
- Conflicts: World War II; Korean War; Vietnam War
- Awards: Distinguished Service Medal; Legion of Merit (3)

William Beehler Bunker (30 September 1910 – 5 June 1969) was a United States Army lieutenant general who served as deputy commanding general of the United States Army Materiel Command from April 1964 until his death in 1969. Though not an aviator himself, he was largely responsible for the acquisition of close combat support aircraft for the Army before and during the Vietnam War.

== Early life and education ==
Born into a military family at Fort Slocum, New York, Bunker enlisted in the Army on 29 June 1929. He was subsequently appointed to the United States Military Academy, graduating with a B.S. degree on 12 June 1934. Bunker was commissioned as a second lieutenant of cavalry, but transferred to the Corps of Engineers effective 14 November 1935. He then earned an M.S. degree in civil engineering from the Massachusetts Institute of Technology in 1937.

== Military career ==
Before American entry into World War II, Bunker participated in the 1939–1940 engineering review of a barge canal project through Nicaragua by surveying the proposed route.

Bunker began to manage marine and rail transport equipment during the war, earning his first award of the Legion of Merit. He was reassigned to the Transportation Corps on 12 August 1946 and officially transferred effective 18 August 1950. Bunker was in charge of Ground Terminal Operations during the Berlin Airlift and he helped coordinate the airlift activities between Japan and Busan during the early stages of the Korean War.

Bunker became a proponent of using helicopters to transport troops and supplies in the early 1950s. He authored a report which clearly established the logistical benefit of using helicopters as a complement to ground transportation. His temporary promotion to brigadier general was approved on 18 May 1956. It was made permanent on 10 March 1961. As Assistant Chief of Transportation for Army Aviation, Bunker helped arrange for the purchase of the CV-2 Caribou. From 1956 to 1962, he served as commanding general of the Army Transportation Materiel Command.

His temporary promotion to major general was approved on 24 February 1961. It was made permanent on 28 February 1963. He served as comptroller and director of programs for the Army Materiel Command from June 1962 to April 1964 and then became its deputy commanding general. From 1962 to 1968, he directed the expansion of the Army aircraft inventory from about 5,700 to over 11,000.

Bunker was promoted to lieutenant general effective 9 May 1966 after having received Senate confirmation. He died from a heart attack in his quarters at Fort Myer, Virginia two months before his scheduled retirement on 1 August 1969.

== Honors ==
Bunker received three awards of the Legion of Merit during his career. Presentation of the Army Distinguished Service Medal at his retirement ceremony had already been approved on 29 January 1969. The award was presented posthumously after his untimely death.

In 1974, Bunker was posthumously inducted into the Army Aviation Hall of Fame for his support of its development during the 1950s. He had been cited by some as the Army's "Father of the Helicopter".

== Personal ==
Bunker was the son of Paul Delmont Bunker and Landon Beehler Bunker. His father was a 1903 West Point graduate who died in a Japanese prisoner of war camp on Formosa in 1943. His maternal grandfather was U.S. Navy Commodore William Henry Beehler, who himself was the son of Francis Beehler of Beehler Umbrella Factory in Baltimore, who founded the first umbrella factory in the USA.

Bunker married Crystle Carr. They had a son and three grandchildren. After Bunker's death, his wife married retired Army Colonel Edmund T. Bullock. Bunker and his wife were buried at Arlington National Cemetery.

== Legacy ==
Bunker Hall at the Army Logistics University, Fort Lee, Virginia was named in his honor.

The Army logistics vessel USAV Lt. General William B. Bunker (LSV-4) was also named in his honor.
