= Beehler Umbrella Factory =

American umbrella manufacturer

Beehler Umbrella Factory or Beehler Umbrella House (1828 to 1975), sometimes spelled Beeler, was an umbrella manufacturing company in Baltimore, Maryland. It was founded in 1828 by German immigrant Francis Beehler. It was the first umbrella factory in the United States, and established Baltimore as the umbrella capital of the country.

== History ==
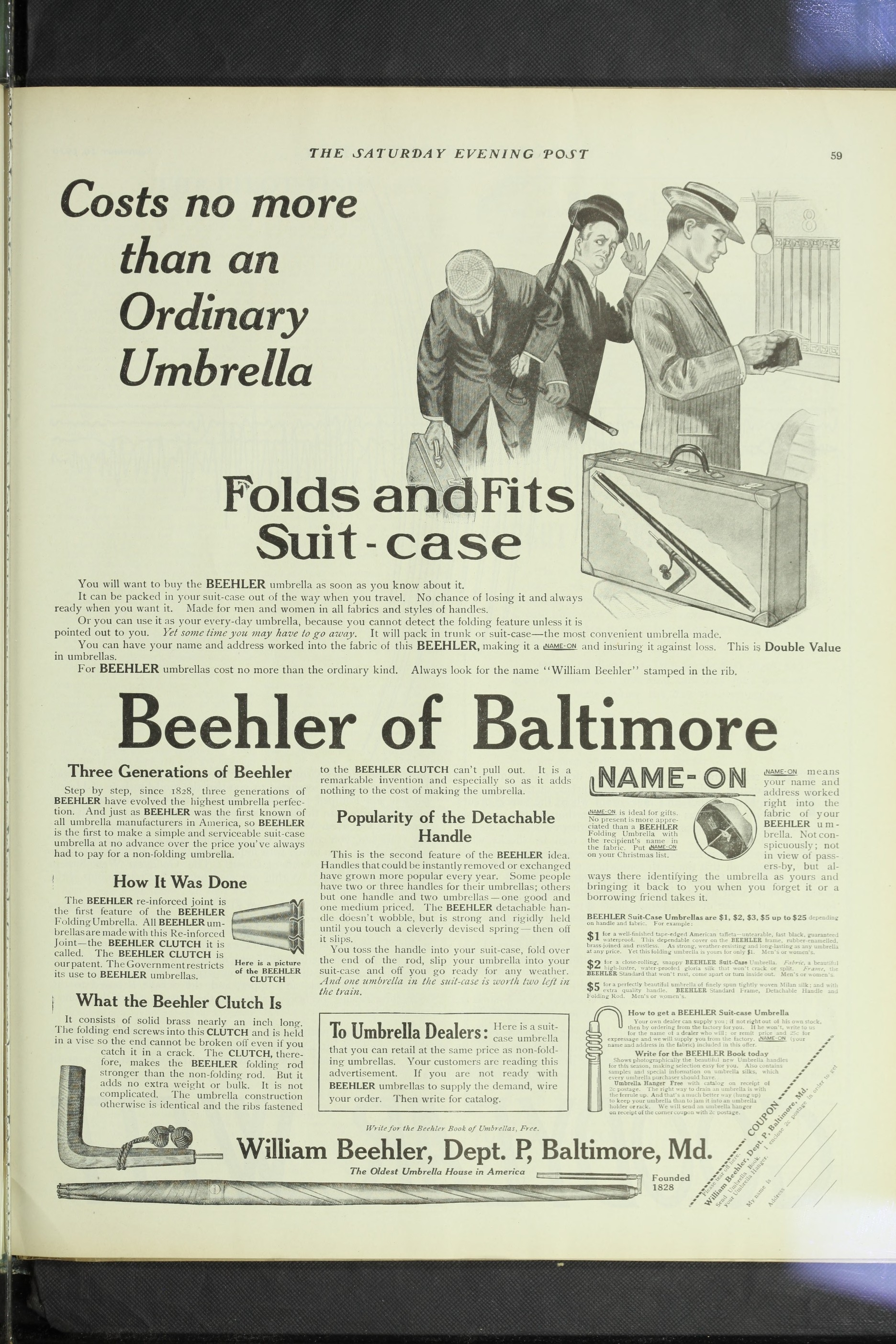
Advertisement for Beehler Umbrella Factory in The Saturday Evening Post from September 10, 1910

Francis (Franz) Beehler (1807–1870) was a woodcarver from Baden-Württemberg, Germany. After emigrating to the United States, he noticed a lack of umbrellas. Americans generally scorned the devices for their "ridiculous effeminacy". Nevertheless, he used his talents in carving wood and bone handles to create a new market for umbrellas, founding the first umbrella factory in the country. A 1908 articles in The Baltimore Sun said it was probably the oldest such factory still operating in the world. The firm was owned and run by Francis until 1870. His youngest son, Charles Edward Beehler (1856–1905), inherited the company and ran it from 1870 to 1905. Finally his son, William Henry Beehler (1884–1976), inherited the company and ran it from 1905 to 1975.

The business did a brisk trade. It also attracted competitors, at the umbrella peak in the 1920s, there were seven companies in Baltimore producing millions of umbrellas annually. Baltimore was recognized as the umbrella capital of the country.

The company ceased operations in 1975, when president William Henry Beehler retired at age 90; he died a year later. He had been involved with the company for 75 years, since age 16, and inherited it from his father in 1905 when he was 21. The decline of Baltimore's umbrella industry began with the introduction of the automobile because people walked outside less often; and in the early 1970s, cheaper foreign imports flooded the market. A plaque was installed in 1990 on a building at 204 West Lexington by the Beehler family, although the plaque was subsequently removed when that building was demolished to create a public park.

The factory was originally located on the southwestern corner of Charles and Baltimore Streets, future location of The Baltimore Sun. It moved around to different locations, last on the 200 block of West Lexington Street, comprising a factory, and a fancy sales room at 222 West Lexington, which closed in 1927. In the 19th century, there were other locations associated with the Beehlers at 235 West Baltimore Street, 624 West Lexington Street, and 131 West Lexington Street.

=== Explosion ===
In 1922, there was a major fire on the 200 block of West Lexington Street. As firemen arrived they saw heavy smoke, and began pouring water into the buildings. This caused a massive explosion that blew out the storefront plate glass windows, seriously injuring 20 firefighters who were blown across Lexington Street, killing fire captain George Leniz (Engine Co. #7). The explosion was the result of a celluloid product, an early form of plastic that was used to make umbrella handles.

== Products and advertising ==
Prior to 1852, umbrellas were typically made of wooden posts, whale-bone ribs, and oiled canvas. They were heavy and prone to breaking. Oiled silk began to replace canvas, and in 1852 a Mr. Fox from England invented channeled steel ribs. These inventions reduced the weight and increased the strength and durability of umbrellas.

At the beginning of the 20th century, the young third generation president, William Henry Beehler, went heavy into advertising. The advertisements showed expensive umbrellas with special features. These included "Name-On", which stitched the owners name and address prominently on the inside of the fabric. According to Beehler, the name is not visible from the outside, "but as soon as the umbrella is raised, it is right there to identify the umbrella and nudge the conscious of anyone who has taken it by mistake." The ribs were made of steel to prevent collapse, and covered in a rubber enamel to resist rust. The raising mechanism was made of brass and nickel using a patented technology called the "Beehler Clutch". The handle was removable, allowing owners to use the same handle on different umbrellas, or to pack the umbrella in luggage.

In 1909, the umbrellas cost $2 to $25 ($72 to $896 adjusted for inflation), depending on the fabric selected, including silk, and the handle, such as carved ivory. The products were sold through mail-order, dealers, and in retail stores located on the same block as the factory.

The company also produced other products with decorated handles, such as whips, and canes.

The slogan, "Born in Baltimore, Raised Everywhere", is sometimes misattributed to Beehler; it was in fact the slogan of the Gans Brothers, another umbrella maker.

== See also ==
- William Beehler Bunker
