= Wang Jing (businessman) =

Chinese businessman (born 1972)

- Born: 1972 (age 53–54); Beijing, China
- Occupations: Chairman and ceo of Skyrizon Aviation, Beijing Xinwei

Wang Jing (Chinese: 王靖; pinyin: Wáng Jìng; born 1972) is a Chinese businessman. He is the chairman and CEO of Skyrizon Aviation and Beijing Xinwei, a Chinese telecoms company. Among his major interests is the HK Nicaragua Canal Development Investment (HKND) that manages the Nicaraguan Canal and Development Project to build the Nicaragua Canal.

== Early life ==
Wang was born in Beijing, and studied at Jiangxi University of Traditional Chinese Medicine without graduating. Later, he organized Beijing Changping Traditional Health and Culture School.

== Career ==
In the 1990s, he went to Hong Kong to study finance and investment. In 1998, he founded Dingfu Investment Consulting Co. in Beijing and, in 2001, Hong Kong Divine (Dingfu) Investment Group Ltd. It is unclear how he later acquired a large 37% stake in Beijing Xinwei Telecom Technology. When he sold his stake to a listed company now named Beijing Xinwei, his position in Forbes' listing of China's billionaires jumped from No. 94 in 2013 to No. 12 in 2014.

Beside his interest in HKND, Wang has involvements in project consulting, mining and agribusiness. A project to develop a Black Sea deep water seaport north of Sevastopol is on hold because of political instability.

In November 2015, it was reported that the Nicaragua Canal project had been delayed due to an environmental impact assessment and a collapse in the Chinese stock market which meant that Wang Jing's net worth, at one time over $10 billion, had significantly declined.

According to Forbes, Wang Jing had a net worth of $3.3 billion in November 2015, which decreased to $905 million by October 2018.
