= Sulawesi Canal =

Proposed canal through the island of Sulawesi, Indonesia

Coordinates: 0.16°S 120.0°E

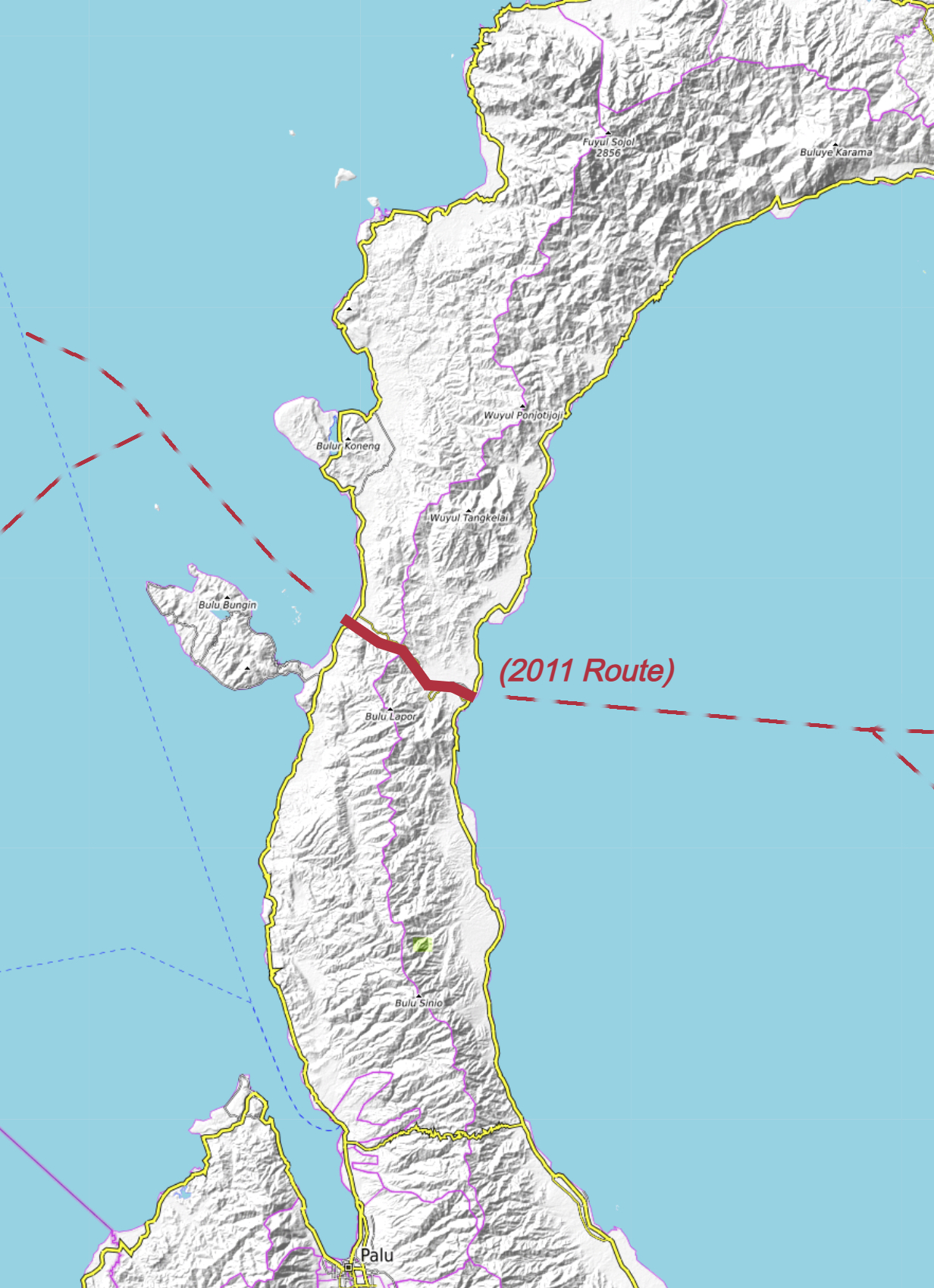
Proposed Sulawesi Canal route

Proposals for a Sulawesi Canal, or an Equatorial Canal (Indonesian: Kanal Khatulistiwa), through the island of Sulawesi to connect the Gulf of Tomini with the Makassar Strait, have existed since the early 2000s. The aim is to create a busy international sea route that will shorten the sea transport distance from the eastern part of Sulawesi Island to the western part of Indonesia, as well as to the Philippines and Malaysia. The canal would be 30 km long .

== History ==
The idea of building a canal through Sulawesi was suggested as early as the 2000s. The building of the canal was pressed by the Head of the Central Sulawesi Marine and Fisheries Service, Dr. Hasanuddin Atjo, in the context of the implementation of the Masterplan for the Acceleration and Expansion of Indonesian Economic Development (MP3EI) under the presidency of Susilo Bambang Yudhoyono. According to Hasanuddin, the idea to build the Equatorial Canal was initially proposed by then Governor of Gorontalo province, Fadel Muhammad, during a meeting of Sulawesi governors in Palu in early 2008. After his inauguration as Minister of Maritime Affairs and Fisheries, Fadel Muhammad had conveyed this idea to President Susilo Bambang Yudhoyono and even Bappenas and the Ministry of Marine Affairs and Fisheries have provided support to develop a strategic plan for the development of this canal which is integrated with the management of Tomini Bay. The canal plan also had a Strategic Plan (Renstra) document, but at that time it was not considered too urgent. Thus no action has been taken on its realization.

On 30 January 2015 the idea of building the canal was then resurfaced by the new Governor of Gorontalo province, Rusli Habibie. The proposal was made when he was given the opportunity to present a regional programme related to the potential development of the Indonesian Sea Route Region II (ALKI II) at the Ministry of Maritime Affairs and Fisheries (KKP) Office. According to the Governor, the Sulawesi Canal, which is located in the "neck" of Sulawesi Island, was seen as very strategic to encourage the development of ALKI, especially for the central part of Indonesia. The canal is to facilitate access to sea transport connecting Western and Eastern Indonesia. In addition to proposing the Sulawesi Canal, Rusli also proposed that in the implementation of APBN project work in the regions consider local entrepreneurs and human resources. This is intended so that the regional economy can grow better. With this, six local governments in Sulawesi agreed on planning to build an equatorial canal that will cut across the island of Sulawesi. The six provinces are Gorontalo, South Sulawesi, Central Sulawesi, West Sulawesi, Southeast Sulawesi, and North Sulawesi.

On 5 August 2019, Member of Commission VII of the People's Representative Council from the NasDem faction, Ahmad Ali, reiterated the idea of the canal. This follows the discourse on the proposal of moving the capital city of Indonesia to island of Kalimantan as initiated by President Joko Widodo. Ali has said that the Sulawesi canal will also provide access to the South China Sea route. So that in the future it can become a gateway, especially for the Eastern Indonesia region. During this, He analyzed that the route will summarise logistical journeys from the east, especially the transport of Morowali steel manufacturing materials, Banda Sea Fisheries, Cloves, crops from the Timor and Maluku Islands, will automatically sail through this route to the South China Sea. However, he sees the need for studies, especially related to geological safety as so that all geological risks can be reduced. This is because the Sulawesi neckline that will become the object of the Sulawesi canal is located on the Palu Koro fault area. The same fault that caused the 2018 Sulawesi earthquake and tsunami.

== Impact ==
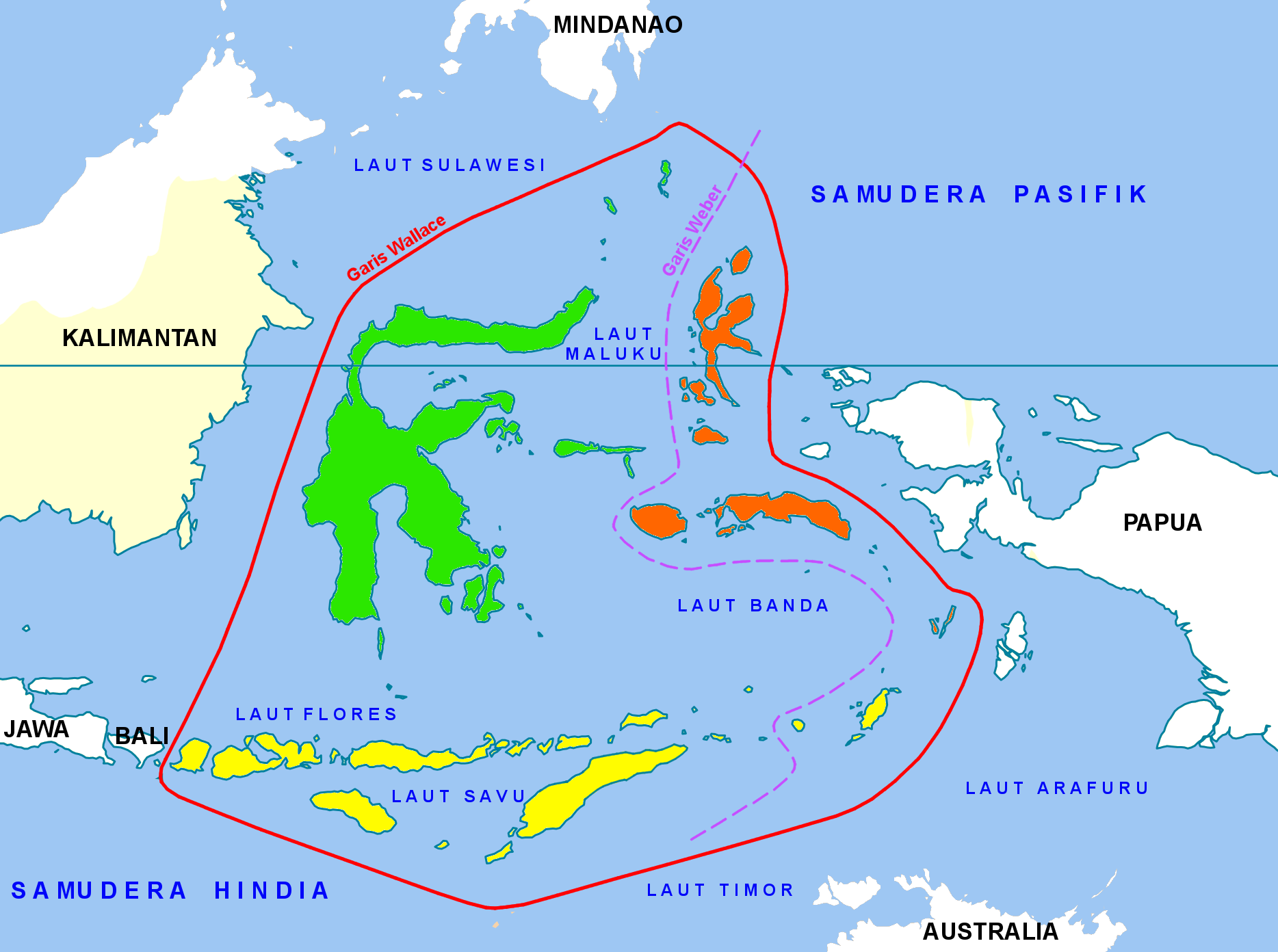
Wallacea Zone which covers Eastern Indonesia including Sulawesi Island and the Lesser Sunda Islands (Nusa Tenggara) except Papua which is included in the Weber Line.

The Equatorial Canal could become a busy international sea route and would shorten sea transport distances from the eastern part of Sulawesi Island to western Indonesia, as well as to the Philippines and Malaysia.

The canal would also benefit the sustainability of the gas industry in Sulawesi, especially the shipping of LNG products from PT Donggi Senoro LNG in Luwuk, Banggai, Central Sulawesi.

And with the prospects of Indonesia's new capital, Nusantara, the effect of moving the national capital from Jakarta to Kalimantan would be seen as a way to accelerate business and economy of Sulawesi and eastern provinces.

== See also ==
- Thai Canal
- Nicaragua Canal
- Suez Canal
