= Thai Canal =

Proposed canal

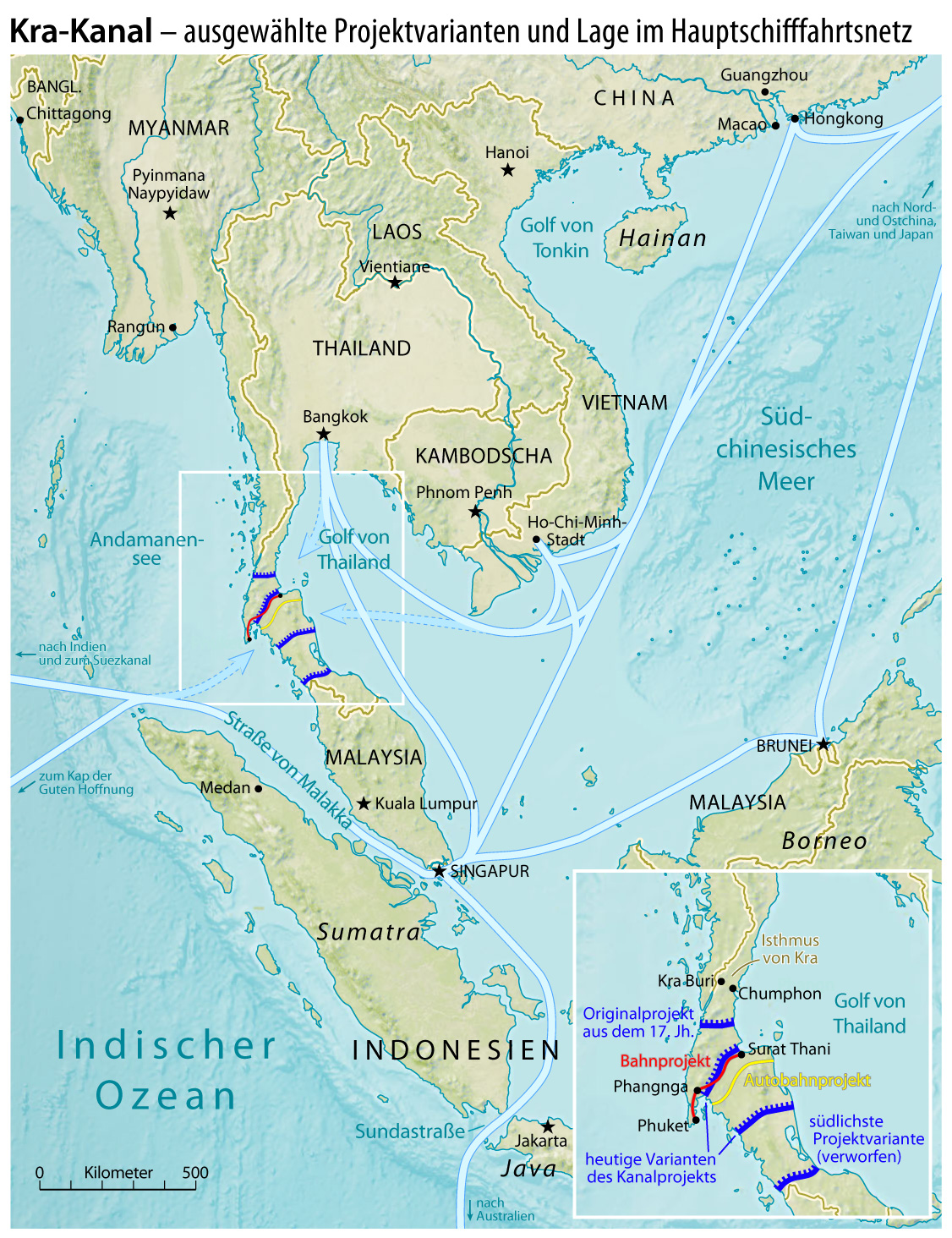
Proposed Thai Canal routes

The Thai Canal (Thai: คลองไทย), also known as the Kra Canal (คลองกระ) or the Kra Isthmus Canal (คลองคอคอดกระ), is any of several proposals for a canal that would connect the Gulf of Thailand with the Andaman Sea across the Kra Isthmus in southern Thailand. Such a canal is suggested to significantly reduce travel times through heavily-navigated trade routes.

The canal would provide an alternative to transit through the Strait of Malacca and shorten transit for shipments of oil to Japan and China by 1,200 km. China refers to it as part of its 21st century maritime Silk Road. Proposals, as of 2015, measure 102 kilometres long, 400 meters wide and 25 meters deep. Plans for a canal have been discussed and explored at various times. Cost, environmental concerns, and geopolitical concerns have been weighed against the potential economic and strategic benefits.

In February 2018, Thailand's Prime Minister Prayut Chan-o-cha declared that the canal was not a government priority.

== History ==
A canal through the Kra Isthmus, which would shorten shipping times around Asia, was suggested as early as 1677. Thai King Narai asked the French engineer de Lamar to survey the possibility of building a waterway to connect Songkhla with Marid (now Myanmar), but the idea was discarded as impractical with the technology of that time.

In 1793, the idea resurfaced. Maha Sura Singhanat, the younger brother of King Chakri (Rama I), suggested it would make it easier to protect the west coast with military ships. In the early-19th century, the British East India Company became interested in a canal. After Burma became a British colony in 1863, an exploration was undertaken with Victoria Point (Kawthaung) opposite the Kra estuary as its southernmost point, again with negative result. In 1882, the constructor of the Suez canal, Ferdinand de Lesseps, visited the area, but the Thai king did not allow him to investigate in detail. In 1897, Thailand and the British empire agreed not to build a canal so that the regional dominance of the harbour of Singapore would be maintained.

In 1946, Thailand and the United Kingdom signed the Anglo-Thai Peace Treaty, ending the state of war between the two countries during the Second World War. Out of the many concessions made in the treaty, one of the articles forbid the Thais from digging a canal across the Kra isthmus without British government permission.

As there was no progress on a canal, the construction of a road for cargo across the isthmus was started in 1993. Such a large highway was built, but because the location of the harbours was not set, Highway 44 does not yet end at the sea. Its sets of lanes are 150 m apart to leave space for railway and a pipeline. As of 2020, the highway runs from 8°18.11′N 98°47.03′E to 9°9.47′N 99°31.02′E.

== Geography ==
The width of the Kra Isthmus at its minimum is only 44 km (27 mi), but the height of the intervening hills is 75 m (246 ft). The Panama Canal has a length of 77 km (48 mi), but highest point at the Culebra Cut was only 64 m (210 ft). The Panama Canal passes this point at a height of 12 m (39 ft) (canal bottom) and 26 m (85 ft) (water line), thus ships have to be lifted with locks to a height of 26 m (85 ft) above the ocean. The Suez Canal is 192 km (119 mi) long but passes entirely through a flat area (which was historically flooded by seas). At a depth of 25 m (82 ft) below sea level the width of the Kra Isthmus is about 200 km (120 mi). At 50 m (160 ft) below sea level this becomes about 400 km (250 mi).

Several canal routes have been proposed: the original Kra Canal was envisioned as cutting through the Kra Isthmus between Ranong and Chumphon, the narrowest part of the South, a distance of about 50 kilometres. Other routes proposed include a route in southern Thailand connecting Bandon Bay near Surat Thani with Phang Nga Province. Another is across Nakhon Si Thammarat Province and Trang Province. The seemingly preferred version of the Kra Canal project—Route 9A—would dig through Krabi, Trang, Phattalung, Nakhon Si Thammarat and Songkhla, a distance of 128 kilometres. Variation Route 5A would have ships enter the canal at Pak Bara in Satun Province. Another route would see ships entering a 135 km long canal at Sikao in Trang.

== Rationale ==
The idea of a Kra Canal has been proposed in modern times since the 1930s, but has never materialized due to high cost and environmental repercussions.

The Strait of Malacca, just under 1,000 kilometres (620 mi) long, is narrow, less than 2.5 kilometres (1.6 mi) at the narrowest, and just 25 metres (82 ft) deep at its shallowest point. It is used by many oil tankers, bulk carriers and container ships. It is estimated that some 80% of Japan's and South Korea's oil and natural gas supplies pass through it. The strait, the world's busiest shipping route, saw a record 84,000 vessels sail through it in 2016. Its yearly capacity is 120,000 vessels. The Maritime Institute of Malaysia forecasts that by 2025, about 140,000 vessels and freighters will seek to transit the strait. A canal would reduce shipping times between the South China Sea and the Andaman Sea by two or three days and reduce distance travelled by at least 1,200 kilometres compared with the strait. Bunker fuel savings for a 100,000 dwt (deadweight) oil tanker could be as much as US$350,000 per trip.

In 2014, after the USA refused to recognize Thailand's military coup, Thailand distanced itself from the USA and became closer to China's string of pearls masterplan.

In early 2015, calls for yet another feasibility study of the canal were put forward, a leading proponent being the Thai-Chinese Culture and Economic Association of Thailand (TCCEAT). Supporters of the canal believe that it would end Thailand's economic slump and make it a "global shipping and economic hub, rivalling the Panama Canal". On 15 May 2015, a memorandum of understanding was signed by the China-Thailand Kra Infrastructure Investment and Development company (中泰克拉基础设施投资开发有限公司) in Guangzhou to advance the project. On 19 May 2015 the Thai government denied reports that an agreement had been signed with China to construct the canal. The canal would take an estimated ten years to complete at a cost of US$28 billion.

In 2005, an internal report prepared for U.S. Secretary of Defense Donald Rumsfeld was leaked to The Washington Times, spelling out China's strategy of underwriting construction of the canal across the Kra Isthmus, with Chinese port facilities and refineries, as part of its "string of pearls" strategy of forward bases and energy security. The Chinese plan called for construction over ten years employing roughly 30,000 workers at a cost of between US$20–25 billion.

== Impacts ==
=== Prices ===
As of 2011, an estimated 15.1 million barrels of oil per day pass through the Strait of Malacca, the existing route. Excluding port fees and tolls, it costs about US$0.00106 per ton-mile to operate a 265,000 DWT double-hulled tanker in 1995 dollars. Thus, assuming a one-way distance saved of 600 kilometres (370 mi), (Note: Source says 1,200–1,300 km, however this appears to be a round-trip value (i.e., includes the return trip). The transportation cost source used does not appear to include the cost per mile of empty tankers, so we'll ignore the second half of the round trip for now.) about 6.5 barrels per ton of crude oil, (Note: Source says 272 gal per ton; knowing that 1 barrel is 42 gal, we get 272/42 ≈ 6.48.) and adjusting to 2011 dollars, the Thai canal could hypothetically reduce the cost of crude by about US$0.09 per barrel, which, if the entire traffic of the competing strait were diverted, would reduce annual oil shipping costs by US$493 million, disregarding canal fees and the return trip costs of the empty tanker.

=== Environmental concerns ===
Several countries have concerns about environmental impact.

=== Thailand ===
A canal will divide the country physically and pose a security risk. The canal may separate the four southernmost provinces from the rest of Thailand and facilitate secessionist movements to further develop.

=== Singapore ===
The canal would compete directly with ports in the Strait of Malacca area, including Port Klang, Tanjung Pelepas, and Singapore. According to a May 2002 report in the Malaysian Business Times, any effect on Malaysia would not be felt for 15 years after the completion of the canal. Singapore has expressed concerns about an adverse impact on its economy from the proposed canal. One report estimated that Singapore might lose 30% of its shipping trade as a result of the canal.

=== India ===
According to US and Indian analysts, a Thai Canal could potentially improve China's naval presence and opportunity in the Indian Ocean. From a military viewpoint, they speculate that a Thai Canal will be an important step for China to strengthen what they call China's "String of Pearls", a series of Chinese alliances and naval bases, including deepwater seaports in Sri Lanka and Pakistan. The analysts fear that a Thai Canal, in combination with the String of Pearls, will encircle India militarily in the ongoing China-India conflict.

== See also ==
- MRL East Coast Rail Link, a land bridge project in Malaysia linking the Strait of Malacca with the South China Sea
- Attempts to build a canal across Nicaragua, a proposed canal project located on Nicaragua
- Panama Canal expansion 2007–2016
- Southern Economic Corridor, a land bridge project aimed at linking the Gulf of Thailand with the Andaman Sea.
- Sulawesi Canal, a proposed canal project located on the island of Sulawesi, Indonesia
- String of Pearls, Chinese geopolitical goal used for supporting the project
- Suez Canal
