= Punta Gorda River =

River in Nicaragua

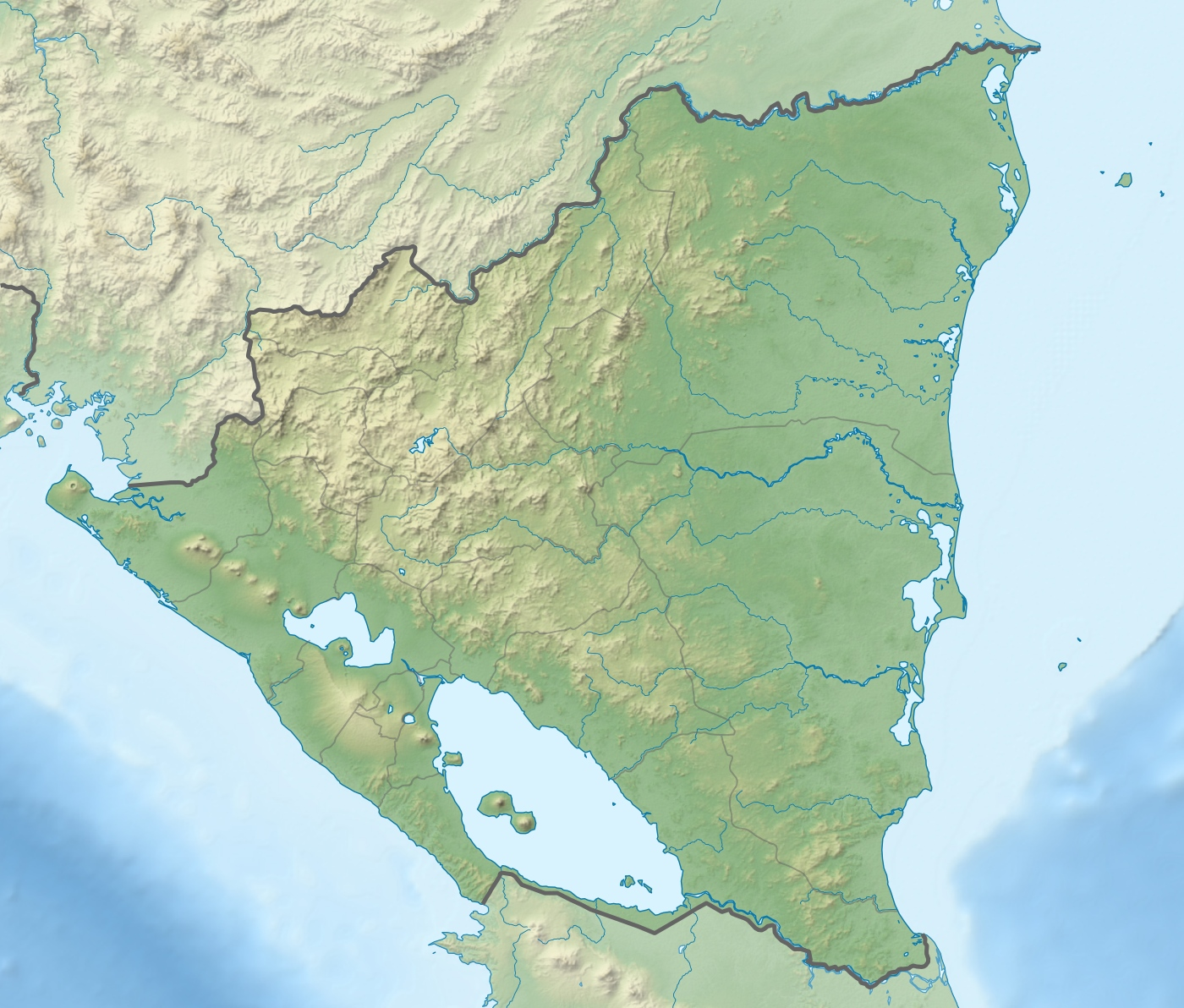
- Location of mouth

Location
- Country: Nicaragua

Physical characteristics
- Mouth
  - location: Punta Gorda
  - coordinates: 11°30′32″N 83°46′26″W

The Punta Gorda River (Rio Punta Gorda) is a river in eastern Nicaragua. It originates in the Caribbean highland and flows east to enter the Caribbean Sea at Punta Gorda. Part of the river's drainage area is the protected Punta Gorda Natural Reserve.

The upper river valley is scheduled to be dammed to create the Atlanta reservoir for the Nicaraguan Canal and Development Project, the Nicaraguan Canal to link the Atlantic and Pacific Oceans. The canal will be built in the Punta Gorda valley.

== Popular culture ==
- W. Douglas Burden describes Punta Gorda in his book, Look to the Wilderness.
