= USAV Lt. General William B. Bunker =

General Frank S. Besson Jr. class support vessel of the US Navy

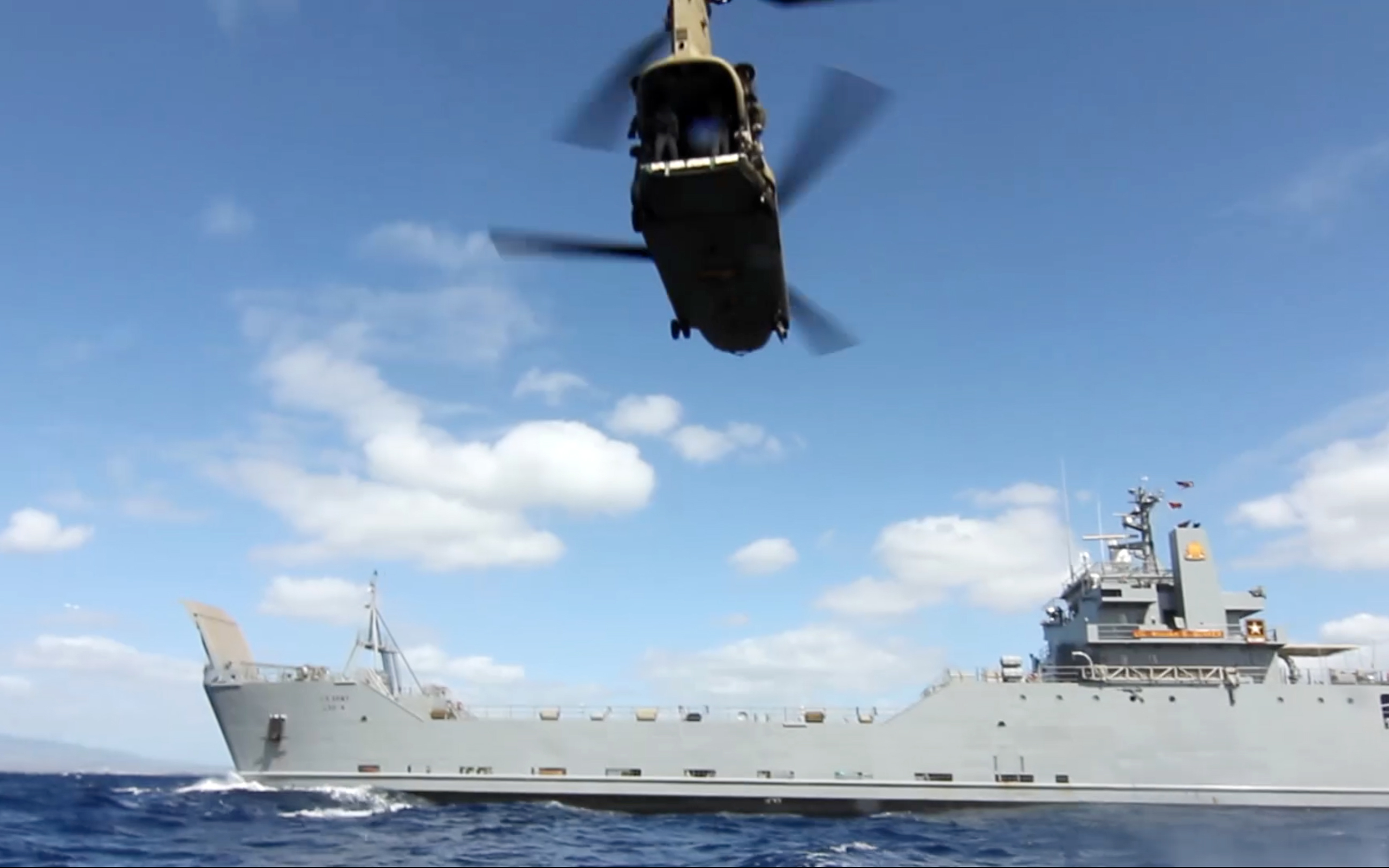
- USAV Lt. General William B. Bunker on 11 February 2015

History

United States
- Name: Lt. General William B. Bunker
- Namesake: William B. Bunker
- Operator: United States Army
- Builder: VT Halter Marine, Pascagoula
- Acquired: 18 March 1988
- Commissioned: 1988
- Home port: Yokohama North Dock
- Identification: MMSI number: 368806000; Callsign: AAEF; Pennant number: LSV-4
- Status: Active

General characteristics
- Class & type: General Frank S. Besson class roll-on/roll-off
- Displacement: 4,199 long tons (4,266 t)
- Length: 273 ft (83 m)
- Beam: 60 ft (18 m)
- Draft: 12 ft (3.7 m)
- Propulsion: 2 × EMD 16-645E2; 1,950 hp (1,454 kW) each at 999 rpm
- Speed: 9.5 knots (17.6 km/h; 10.9 mph) light; 8.5 knots (15.7 km/h; 9.8 mph) loaded
- Range: 6,200 nmi (11,500 km) light; 4,500 nmi (8,300 km) loaded
- Complement: 8 officers, 23 enlisted

USAV Lt. General William B. Bunker (LSV-4) is a General Frank S. Besson Jr.-class roll-on/roll-off of US Army.

== Design ==
Named in honor of Gen. Frank S. Besson Jr., former Chief of Transportation, U.S. Army, these ships have bow and stern ramps and the ability to beach themselves, giving them the ability to discharge 900 short tons of vehicles and cargo over the shore in as little as four feet of water, or 2,000 short tons as an intra-theater line haul roll-on/roll-off cargo ship. The vessel's cargo deck is designed to handle any vehicle in the US Army inventory and can carry up to 15 M1 Abrams main battle tanks or 82 ISO standard containers.

== Construction and career ==
She was acquired by the US Army on 18 March 1988 and commissioned in 1988 into the 1099th Transportation Detachment, 7th Expeditionary Transportation Brigade.

== Gallery ==
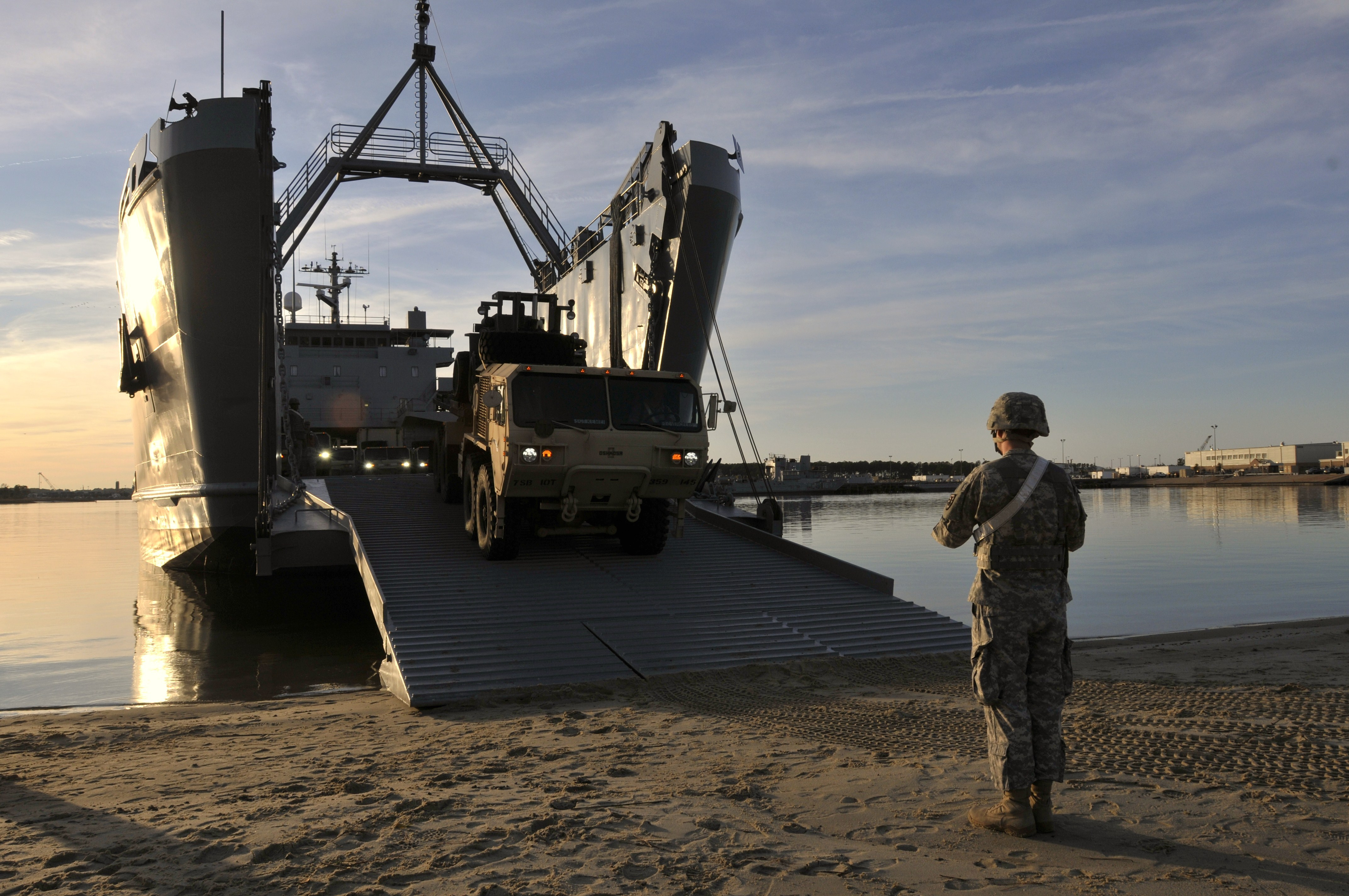
USAV Lt. General William B. Bunker and 359th Inland Cargo Transfer Company on 7 February 2012

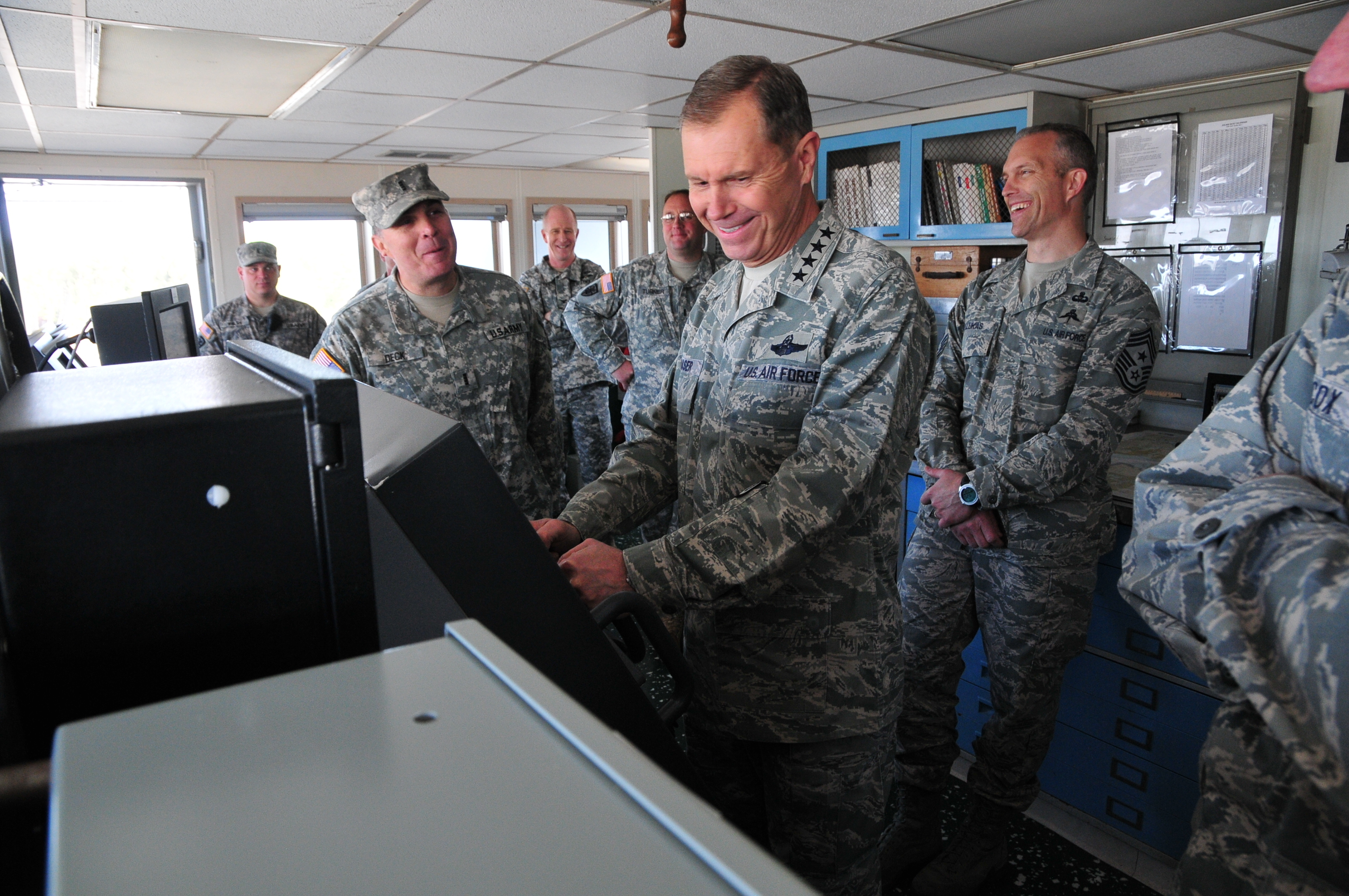
General William M. Fraser III aboard USAV Lt. General William B. Bunker on 10 April 2012

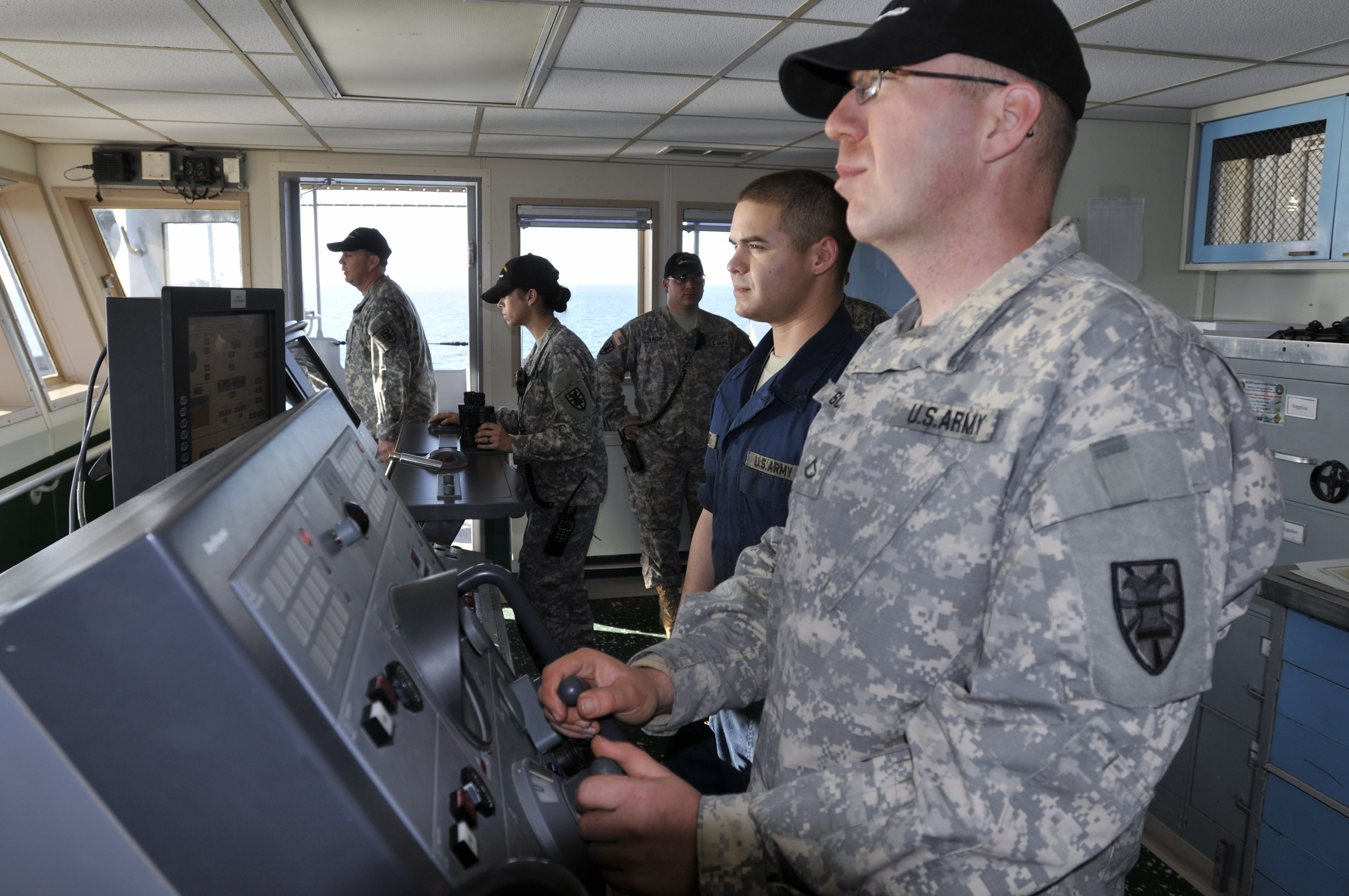

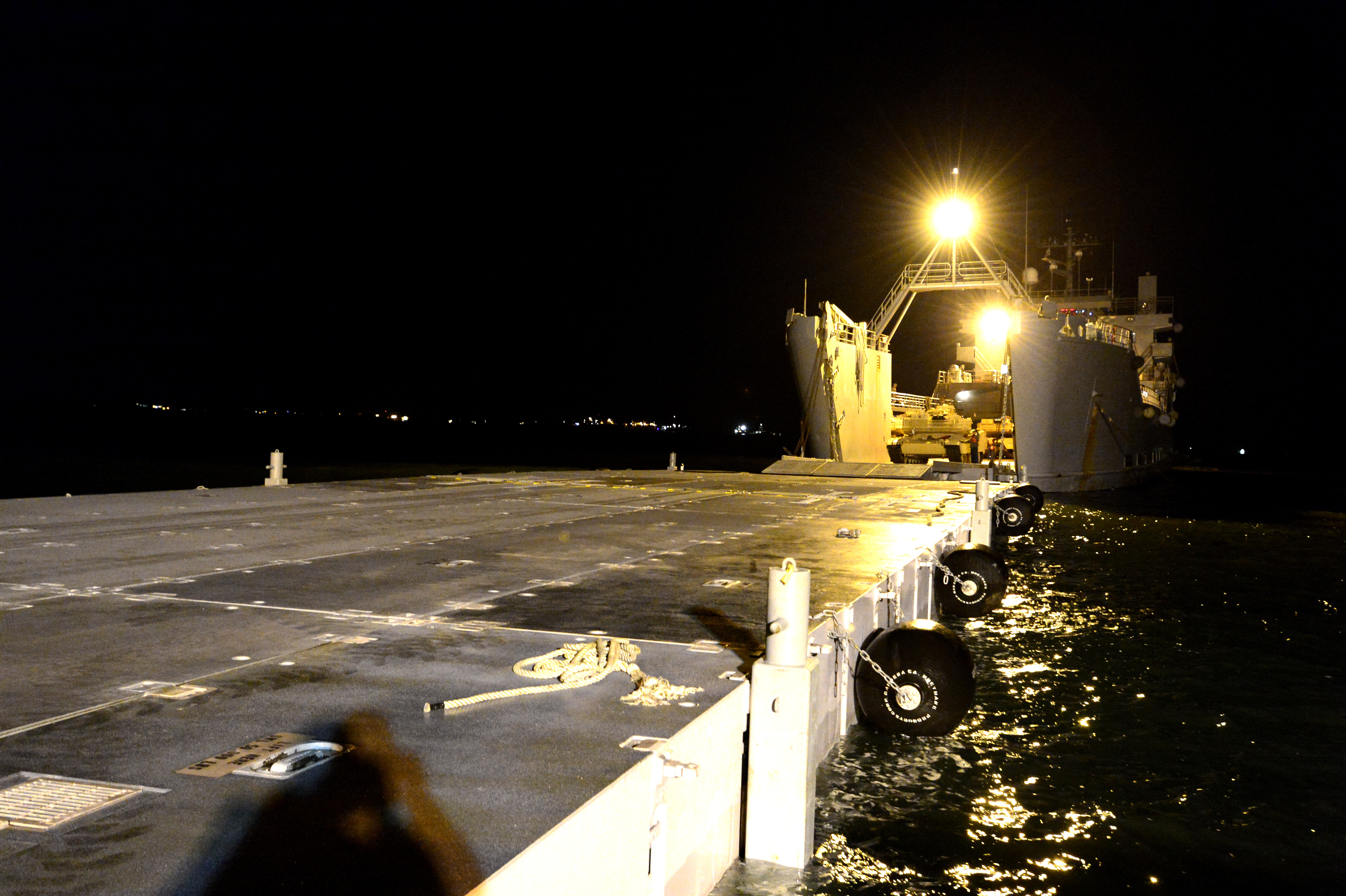
USAV Lt. General William B. Bunker on 19 April 2013

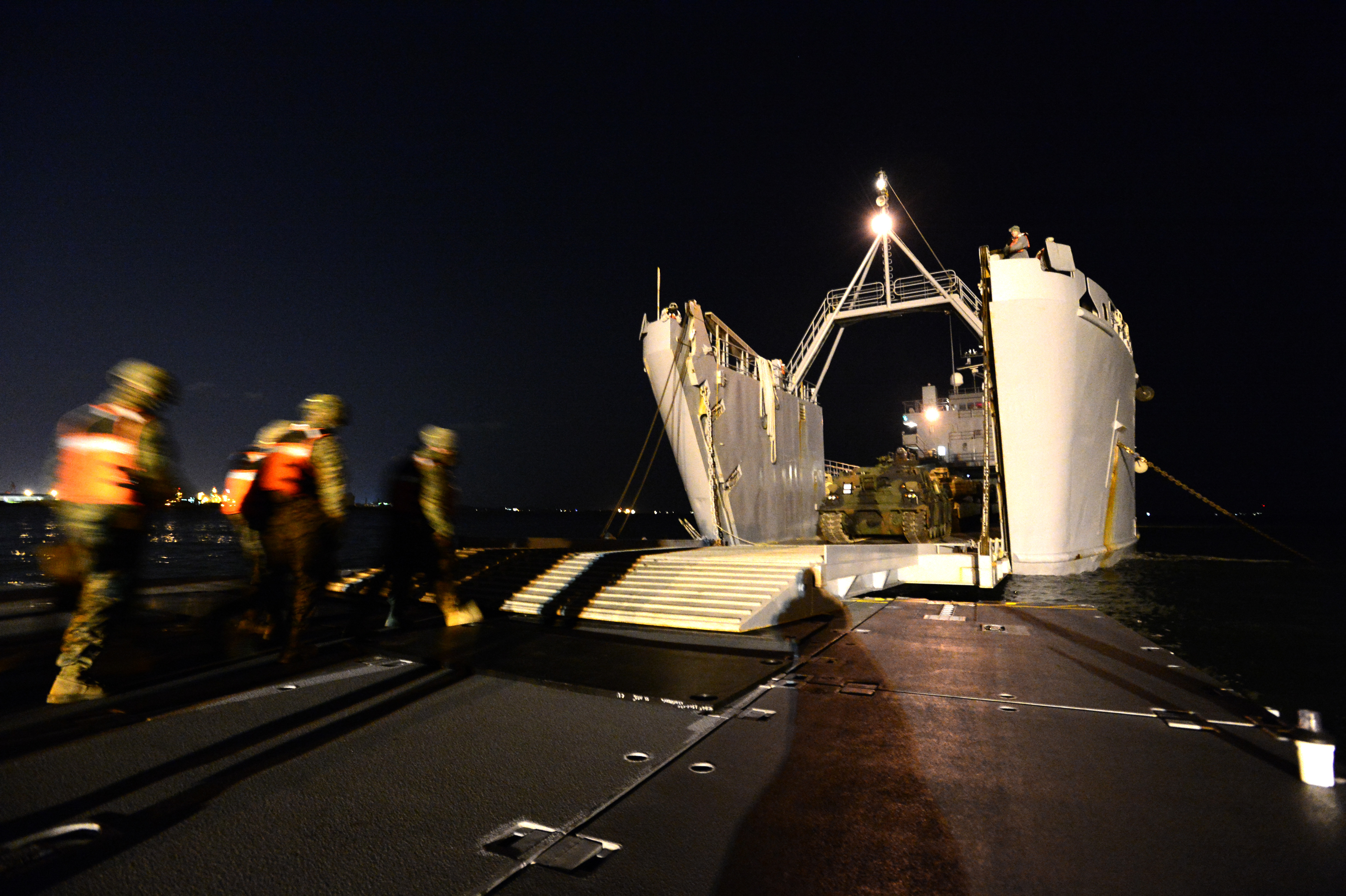

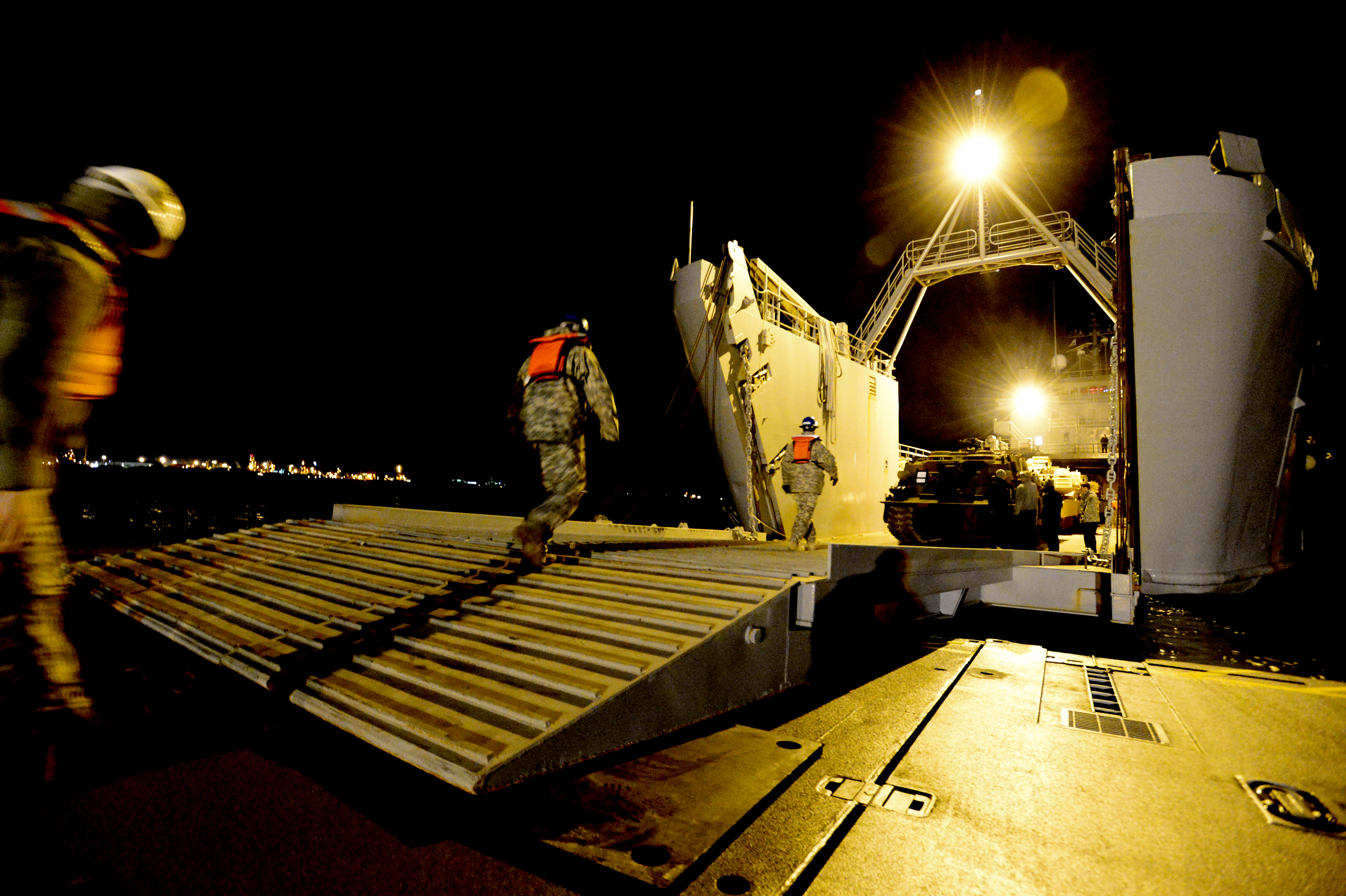
