= HK Nicaragua Canal Development Investment =

Private infrastructure development firm

HK Nicaragua Canal Development Investment Co., Ltd. also known as HKND was a private infrastructure development firm that is registered in Hong Kong. HKND was founded in 2012 with the purpose to develop the Nicaragua Canal as a wider and deeper alternative to the Panama Canal. HK Nicaragua Canal Development Investment is owned or controlled by the Chinese businessman Wang Jing. In 2014 it was announced that an IPO is being prepared to provide financing for the project but following financial difficulties, HKND finally closed its offices in April 2018.

== Nicaragua Canal ==
The development of the Nicaragua Canal was the first project for HKND. The cost of the project is estimated to be US$40bn. or US$50bn. The Nicaraguan government approved the Master Concession Agreement with HKND on June 13, 2013, thereby granting the company "the sole rights to the HKND Group to plan, design, construct and thereafter to operate and manage the Nicaragua Grand Canal and other related projects, including ports, a free trade zone, an international airport and other infrastructure development projects." The agreement lasts for 50 years and is renewable for another 50 years. HKND would have paid the Government of Nicaragua US$10m annually. After ten years, Nicaragua would have received shares of HKND at intervals.

The Master Concession Agreement has been criticized by some who argue that Nicaragua sold its sovereignty to a foreign-owned private company for a century. Further, the agreement was negotiated without transparency and national consensus. "All judicial, labour, fiscal and financial rights and sovereignty of the country (have been conceded) to Wang". While the reserves of the Nicaraguan National Bank serve as collateral on part of Nicaragua, HKND has no such potential liability. Further, there are concerns about environmental impact, and that legal rights of indigenous populations are being violated.

Work was to start officially on December 22, 2014, and was scheduled to be completed by 2020, though construction never began. Following financial difficulties, HKND finally closed its offices in April 2018, leaving no forwarding address or telephone numbers to be reached.

== Chief officers ==
Wang Jing is the chairman and chief executive officer of HKND. He managed and invested in various businesses, including infrastructure, mining, aviation and telecommunication. Other chief officers include Bill Wild as the chief project advisor, KK Lee as the deputy general manager, and Ronald MacLean-Abaroa, the former mayor of La Paz, as spokesperson.

== Partners ==
HKND teamed with other companies for the canal project. A major partner was the state-owned China Railway Construction Corporation (CRCC), whose 4th Institute was in charge of designing the canal while the 11th Institute was to build it.

State-owned Xugong Group Construction Machinery Co, one of China's biggest construction equipment manufacturers, would take a 1.5 to 3 percent stake in HKND and become the sole supplier of construction machinery.

As of 2014 other partners include McKinsey & Co to conduct an economic feasibility study, Environmental Resources Management Ltd. to study environmental and social impact of the project, Studiebureau voor Bouwkunde en Expertises (SBE), a Belgium-based civil engineering firm for canal hydraulics, and MEC Mining, an Australia-based engineering consultant company. Also involved are McLarty Associates and the law firm Kirkland & Ellis.
