= Attempts to build a canal across Nicaragua =

Coordinates: 11.5°N 85.0°W

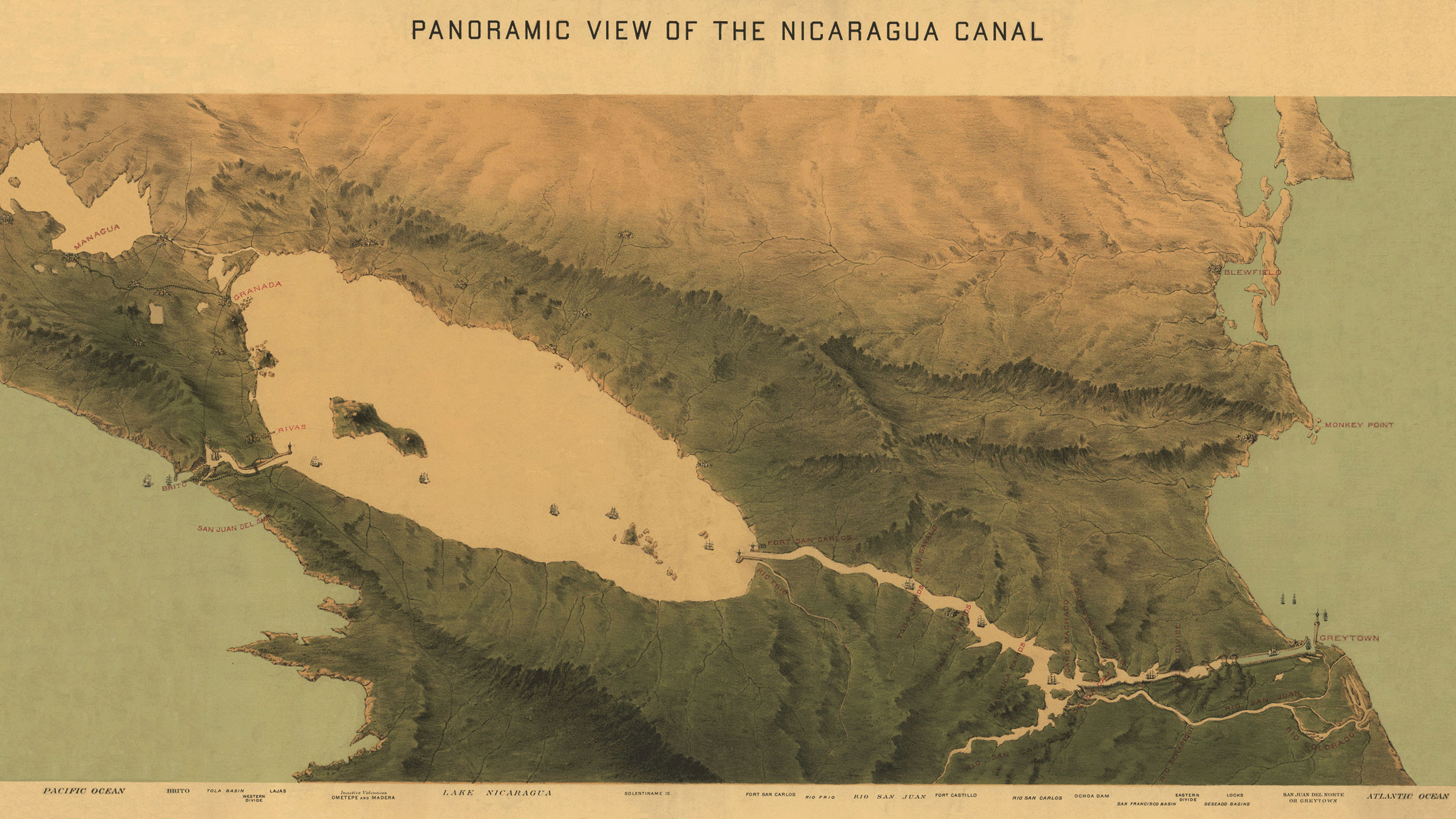
A proposed routing of the canal, from the year 1870, which followed the southern route

Various Nicaragua canal proposals. The Panama Canal is also shown.

Attempts to build a canal across Nicaragua to connect the Atlantic Ocean and the Pacific Ocean stretch back to the early colonial era. Construction of such a shipping route—using the San Juan River as an access route to Lake Nicaragua—was first proposed then. Napoleon III wrote an article about its feasibility in the middle of the 19th century. The United States abandoned plans to construct a waterway in Nicaragua in the early 20th century after it purchased the French interests in the Panama Canal, which has served as the main connecting route across Central America since its completion.

Because the steady increase in global shipping may eventually make the project economically feasible, speculation on a new shipping route has continued. In June 2013, Nicaragua's National Assembly approved a bill to grant a 50-year concession to the HK Nicaragua Canal Development Investment (HKND) to manage the Nicaraguan Canal and Development Project to build the canal, but little development took place, and the concession to HKND was cancelled in May 2024.

== Route ==
Several possible routes for the construction of the Nicaragua Canal have been proposed, all of them using Lake Nicaragua. The following six routes have been discussed to carry traffic from the Caribbean Sea to Lake Nicaragua, which is at an elevation of 32 m (105 ft) above sea level:

1. Route 1 runs from a point near Kukra Hill on the Caribbean coast of the South Caribbean Coast Autonomous Region (RACCS) to the Escondido River and from there to Lake Nicaragua.
2. Route 2 goes from a point near Roca Caiman on the Caribbean coast of RACCS to the Escondido River and from there to Lake Nicaragua.
3. Route 3 runs from the city of Bluefields on the Caribbean coast of RACCS to the Bluefields River and from there to Lake Nicaragua.
4. Routes 4 and 5 go from a point near Punta Gorda River on the Caribbean coast of RACCS to Lake Nicaragua.
5. Route 6 runs from the town of San Juan de Nicaragua via the San Juan River to Lake Nicaragua, which is the route of the older proposal, the Ecocanal.

All the above proposed routes run from a port at or near Bluefields in the Caribbean Sea to Morrito, a small town located on the eastern shore of Lake Nicaragua. From Morrito, ships would continue westward across Lake Nicaragua to a port near the city of La Virgen in the Department of Rivas. At that point, ships would enter a manmade canal and navigate 18–24 kilometers across the isthmus of Rivas to reach the Pacific Ocean via the Brito River.

== Early plans (1551–1909) ==
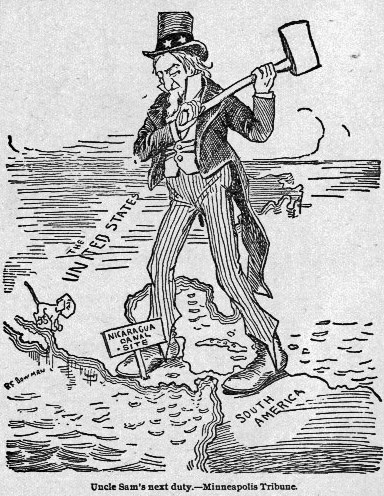
An 1895 cartoon advocating United States action to build the Nicaragua Canal

The idea of constructing a manmade waterway through Central America is old. The routes suggested usually ran across Nicaragua, Panama, or the Isthmus of Tehuantepec in Mexico. The colonial administration of New Spain conducted preliminary surveys as early as 1551, under the supervision of a Spanish explorer named Gormara. Nothing came of this initial attempt, but the idea was revived in 1781 by the Spanish Crown, and surveys were made again, this time under the supervision of an officer named Galisteo. Construction did not occur, as the crown was unable to secure adequate funding.

In 1825, the newly established Federal Republic of Central America (FRCA) considered the waterway. That year, the FRCA government authorities hired surveyors to chart the route and, afterward, contacted the Federal government of the United States to seek financing and the engineering technology needed for building the shipping route, to the advantage of both nations. A survey from the 1830s stated that the waterway would be 278 km (172.7 mi) in length and would generally follow the San Juan River from the Caribbean Sea to Lake Nicaragua, then go through a series of locks and tunnels from the lake to the Pacific Ocean.

While officials in Washington, D.C. thought the project had merit, and Secretary of State Henry Clay formally presented it to the Congress of the United States in 1826, the plan was not approved. The United States was particularly concerned with Nicaragua's relatively high levels of poverty and political instability, as well as the rival strategic and economic interests of the British government, which held British Honduras (later Belize) and had a protectorate over Mosquitia.

=== Early legal agreements ===
On August 26, 1849, the Nicaraguan government signed a contract with the United States businessman Cornelius Vanderbilt. It granted his Accessory Transit Company the exclusive right to construct a waterway within 12 years and gave the same company sole administration of a temporary trade route in which the overland crossing through the isthmus of Rivas was done by train and stagecoach. The temporary route operated successfully, quickly becoming one of the main avenues of trade between New York City and San Francisco. Civil war in Nicaragua and an invasion by filibuster William Walker intervened to prevent the canal from being completed.

Continued interest in the route was an important factor in the negotiation of the Clayton–Bulwer Treaty of 1850. The canal idea was discussed seriously by businessmen and governments throughout the 19th century. In 1888, a bill was proposed in the United States House of Representatives to incorporate a Nicaragua Canal company. In 1890, the American-owned Nicaragua Canal Construction Company held its third annual meeting, while brush was being cleared along the canal route. Many workers fell ill and were hospitalized due to tropical illnesses.

In a letter sent to the Nicaragua Canal Board in 1895, Swiss geographer and nearby Costa Rica resident Henri François Pittier warned that construction of the project would be difficult to carry out, as earthquakes and heavy rainfall were common in the country. Though Pittier did not believe earthquakes alone could hamper any future construction, he acknowledged that an earthquake or any other seismic activity, for that matter, would bring catastrophic landslides if carried out in areas where soil is soaked with significant amounts of water. However, Pittier also suggested that a study could be conducted in the country's western isthmus between Lake Nicaragua and the Pacific Ocean, as rainfall was less common in this part of the country.

=== Canal commissions ===
In 1897, the newly named United States Nicaraguan Canal Commission proposed the idea of building the canal. The Nicaraguan Canal Commission carried out the most thorough hydrological survey yet of the San Juan River and its drainage basin, and in 1899 concluded that an interoceanic project was feasible at a total cost of US$138 million. At the same time, the Geological Society of America published the "Physiography and Geology of Region Adjacent to the Nicaragua Canal Route" in its Bulletin in May 1899, which remains one of the most detailed geological surveys of the San Juan River region.

In 1901, the US's Isthmian Canal Commission of 1899 estimated that the cost of building a canal would be $189 million in Nicaragua versus $184 million—$144 million plus $40 million as a fair price to buy the French Panama Canal Company's incomplete work—in Panama. However, the commission recommended the Nicaragua route because the French Panama Canal Company demanded an "unreasonable" price of $109 million rather than $40 million for its incomplete work. After learning that the commission would recommend the Panama route to the US Congress if the price were reduced, in 1902 the French company agreed to sell for $40 million, causing Congress to settle on Panama rather than Nicaragua.

In the late 19th century, the United States government negotiated with President José Santos Zelaya to lease the land for the construction of a canal through Nicaragua. Luis Felipe Corea, the Nicaraguan minister in Washington, wrote to United States Secretary of State John Hay expressing the Zelaya government's support for such a canal. The United States signed the Sánchez–Merry Treaty with Nicaragua in case the negotiations for a canal through Panama fell through, although the treaty was later rejected by John Hay.

=== Lobbying efforts against the Nicaragua Canal ===
Before Corea completed a draft of the Nicaragua proposal, Congress was considering the Spooner Act to authorize the Panama Canal. In addition to the promise of earlier completion of the Panama Canal, opponents of the Nicaraguan canal cited the risk of volcanic activity at the Momotombo volcano. They favored the construction of a canal through the Isthmus of Panama.

In 1898, the chief of the French Canal Syndicate (a group that owned large swathes of land across Panama), Philippe Bunau Varilla, hired William Nelson Cromwell to lobby the United States Congress for the Panama Canal. In 1902, taking advantage of a year with increased volcanic activity in the Caribbean Sea, Cromwell planted a story in The New York Sun reporting that the Momotombo volcano had erupted and caused a series of seismic shocks. This caused significant concern about its possible effects on a Nicaraguan canal.

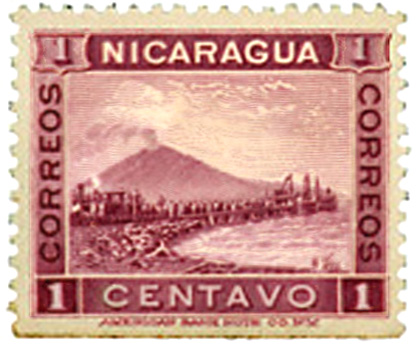
Momotombo 1900 Edition Stamp

Cromwell arranged for leaflets with stamps featuring Momotombo to be sent to every Senator as "proof" of the volcanic activity in Nicaragua. An eruption in May 1902 on the island of Martinique resulted in 30,000 human fatalities. This catastrophe persuaded most of the United States Congress to vote in favor of constructing the canal in Panama, leaving only eight votes in favor of Nicaragua. The decision to build the Panama Canal passed by four votes. Cromwell was paid US$800,000 for his lobbying efforts.

Nicaraguan president Zelaya later tried to arrange for Germany and Japan to finance the building of a canal that would traverse the Zelaya Department in Nicaragua. Having settled on the Panama route, the United States opposed this proposal.

== After the Panama Canal (1910–1989) ==
Since the Panama Canal opened in 1914, the Nicaragua route has been reconsidered. Its construction would shorten the water distance between New York and San Francisco by nearly 800 kilometers (500 mi). Under the Bryan–Chamorro Treaty of 1916, the United States paid Nicaragua US$3 million for an option in perpetuity and free of taxation, including 99-year leases of the Corn Islands and a site for a naval base on the Gulf of Fonseca.

In 1929, the United States Interoceanic Canal Board approved a two-year detailed study for a ship canal route, known as the Sultan Report after its author, the United States Army engineer Colonel Daniel Sultan. From 1930 to 1931, a United States Army Corps of Engineers survey team of 300 men surveyed the route of a future canal, called the Forty-Niners route because it followed closely the route that miners took in the 1840s California Gold Rush. Sultan estimated that the proposed canal would be three times longer than the Panama Canal, have larger locks, and cost twice as much. However, Sultan also acknowledged that he and his team also encountered problems due to heavy rainfall and poisonous wildlife. Army engineers on the project included future Manhattan Project engineers, lieutenants Leslie Groves and Kenneth Nichols, who also assisted in recovery after the 1931 Nicaragua earthquake. In Managua, they carried out extensive demolitions to save portions of the city.

Costa Rica protested that Costa Rican rights to the San Juan River had been infringed, and El Salvador maintained that the proposed naval base would affect both it and Honduras. Both protests were upheld by the Central American Court of Justice in rulings that were not recognized by either Nicaragua or the United States. Both nations repealed the Bryan–Chamorro Treaty on July 14, 1970.

Between 1939 and 1940, with war in Europe underway, a new study was made for the construction of a barge canal. Three variants were considered, with minimum channel depths of six, ten, and twelve feet (1.8, 3.0, and 3.7 m).

The idea of a larger canal, with part of the excavating work to be done with atomic bombs, was revived in the 1960s as part of Operation Plowshare.

== 1990–2009 ==
In 1999, Nicaragua's National Assembly unanimously approved an exploration concession, Law 319, for the construction of a shallow-draft waterway along the San Juan River, known as the Ecocanal. This would connect Lake Nicaragua to the Caribbean Sea, but would lack the inter-oceanic link to the Pacific Ocean. This project is loosely based on the 1939–40 study.

In 2000, the Nicaraguan government granted a concession to Canal Interoceánico de Nicaragua SA (CINN), a company formed and led by New York attorney Don Mario Bosco, to build a railway "dry canal" connecting Nicaragua's coasts. However, CINN was unable to obtain financing to begin construction.

It is possible that these schemes could exist in parallel to the proposed inter-ocean canal.

In 2004, the Nicaraguan government again proposed a canal through the country—large enough to handle post-Panamax ships of up to 250,000 tons, as compared to the approximately 65,000 tons that the Panama Canal can accommodate. The estimated cost of this scheme may be as much as US$25 billion, 25 times Nicaragua's annual budget. Former president Enrique Bolaños sought foreign investors to support the project. The scheme met with strong opposition from environmentalists, who protested the damage it would cause to the rivers and jungle. The project was similar to the original plans, except that the United States government would buy the land for investors to begin construction on the project.

In addition to the governmental waterway proposal, private proposals have been based on a land bridge across Nicaragua. The Intermodal System for Global Transport (SIT Global), involving Nicaraguan, Canadian, and American investors, proposed a combined railway, oil pipeline, and fiber-optic cable; a competing group, the Inter-Ocean Canal of Nicaragua, proposes building a railway linking ports on either coast.

On October 2, 2006, President Enrique Bolaños, at a summit for defense ministers of the Western Hemisphere, officially announced that Nicaragua intended to proceed with the project. Bolaños said that there was sufficient demand for two canals within the Central American isthmus. He proclaimed that the project would cost an estimated US$18 billion and would take approximately 12 years to construct. It would take one of six possible routes at approximately 280 km (170 mi), reduce the transit time from New York to California by one day, and 800 km (500 mi), considerably reduce transit costs from Europe to China and Japan, and have capacity for ships of up to 250,000 tons.

The construction of the canal alone would more than double Nicaragua's GDP (excluding other investments as a result of the canal's construction). Some sources suggest that the construction of the canal would enable Nicaragua to become one of the wealthiest countries in Central America and one of the wealthiest countries in Latin America in per capita terms. The government has been studying proposals for such a development. Supporters believe that all of Central America would benefit from the construction of the canal. If a Nicaraguan canal were built, "it would bring an economic effervescence never seen before in Central America", Bolaños said.

In 2009, Russian President Dmitry Medvedev suggested that Russia would be interested in pursuing the construction of the interoceanic waterway. However, no progress has been made to date, and the construction of the Third Set of Locks for the Panama Canal has apparently dampened Russian enthusiasm for the project. Khalifa bin Zayed bin Sultan Al Nahyan of the United Arab Emirates has also expressed interest in sponsoring an interoceanic canal project.

== HKND project (2010–2024) ==
In 2010, Nicaragua signed a contract with two Korean developers, Dongmyeong Engineering & Architecture Consultants (DMEC) and Ox Investment, to construct a deepwater port and facilities at Monkey Point on the Caribbean coast to improve capacity there.

On July 27, 2012, engineering services provider Royal HaskoningDHV announced that the Nicaraguan government commissioned a feasibility study to be completed in early 2013 at a cost of US$720,000. The contract has been awarded to a consortium consisting of Royal HaskoningDHV and Ecorys. The feasibility study examined the route that followed the San Juan River. The study suggested that this route would both be cheaper and also offer environmental benefits over other routes. This is because it would not be necessary to create an artificial lake to foresee the locks of water, and it would require the moving of relatively small amounts of soil compared to other routes. Also, this plan would not require the construction of a new canal, which would divert water from the San Juan River with negative ecological consequences.

On September 26, 2012, the Nicaraguan government and the newly formed Hong Kong Nicaragua Canal Development Group (HKND) signed a memorandum of understanding regarding the intentions of HKND Group to finance and build the Nicaraguan Canal and Development Project. HKND Group is a private enterprise led by billionaire Wang Jing. HKND Group entered the study phase of development to assess the technological and economic feasibility of constructing a canal in Nicaragua, as well as the potential environmental, social, and regional implications of various routes. The canal and other associated projects would have been financed by investors worldwide and would have generated jobs for Nicaragua and other Central American countries.

On December 22, 2014, HKND announced construction started in Rivas, Nicaragua. HKND Group Chairman Wang Jing spoke during the starting ceremony of the first works of the canal in Brito town. Construction of the new waterway would be run by HKND Group—Hong Kong-based HK Nicaragua Canal Development Investment Co Ltd., which is controlled by Wang Jing.

By 2016, no significant construction had taken place. No "major works" such as dredging will take place until after a Pacific Ocean wharf is finished, and the wharf's construction will not start until sometime after August 2016.

On April 3, 2016, Suzanne Daley, writing in the New York Times, reported that progress on the project seemed stalled. Daley reported that Nicaraguan President Daniel Ortega had not mentioned the Canal in months and that cows were still browsing for grass in the field where Wang held his ground-breaking. She also reported that Wang had financial setbacks unrelated to the Nicaragua project and that he had lost 80% of his net worth.

Following financial difficulties, Wang finally closed the HKND Headquarters in China in April 2018, leaving no forwarding address or telephone numbers to be reached. Even though HKND vanished, the Nicaraguan government indicates that it will go ahead with the vast land expropriations of 908 km^{2} (351 mi^{2}) under land expropriation Law 840 enacted in 2013, which includes a concession for carrying out seven sub-projects, among them ports, oil pipelines, free-trade zones, and develop tourist areas that could be realized in any part of the national territory. In particular, this law denies any right to appeal against the expropriation decision and provides a derisory level of compensation. It also allows the investor (HKND) to buy and sell its rights over the various sub-projects "in parts", which is a highly profitable enterprise. This has been called a "land grab", and it has prompted protests, and some violent confrontations against security forces.

Activists noted that the canal contract stipulated that it must be dissolved in 72 months, if the investor has not obtained the money to start the project; that deadline was 14 June 2019, so they assert that Law 840 (related expropriations) must be repealed.

In May 2024, Law 840, which gave the concession to HKND, was repealed by the National Assembly of Nicaragua, and Law 800, governing the Canal Authority, was reformed.

== Ortega's proposal (2024) ==
In November 2024, Nicaraguan president Ortega revealed his plan for a 276.5-mile (445-km) interoceanic canal. In a presentation to Chinese investors at the XVII China-Latin America and the Caribbean Business Summit in Managua, Ortega said, "Every day it becomes more complicated to pass through Panama", and said Nicaragua's canal project could attract Chinese and American investment. As part of Ortega's new proposal, the Chinese company CAMC had signed a contract with Nicaragua's Ministry of Transportation and Infrastructure for the construction of a deep-water port in Bluefields. From there, the canal would traverse northern Nicaragua via Lake Xolotlan before reaching the Pacific through Puerto Corinto.

However, the proposal attracted criticism on technical, environmental, and economic grounds. Nicaraguan economist Juan Sebastián Chamorro highlighted the harm the project would cause by the displacement of thousands of families.

== See also ==
- Suez Canal
- Interoceanic Corridor of the Isthmus of Tehuantepec
