= List of twin towns and sister cities in Nicaragua =

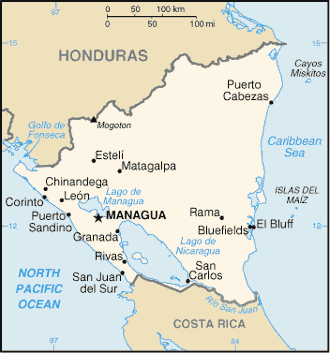
Map of Nicaragua

This is a list of municipalities in Nicaragua which have standing links to local communities in other countries. In most cases, the association, especially when formalised by local government, is known as "town twinning" (usually in Europe) or "sister cities" (usually in the rest of the world).

== A ==
Altagracia

- Bainbridge Island, United States
- Herne, Germany

== B ==
Bluefields

- A Estrada, Spain
- Girona, Spain
- Montevideo, Uruguay

== C ==
Camoapa

- Arcata, United States
- Sant Just Desvern, Spain

Cárdenas

- Malgrat de Mar, Spain

Chichigalpa

- Wels, Austria

Chinandega

- Appleton, United States
- Eindhoven, Netherlands
- Leverkusen, Germany
- Molins de Rei, Spain

Ciudad Antigua

- Algaida, Spain
- Amurrio, Spain
- Bera, Spain

Ciudad Darío

- L'Alcúdia, Spain
- Lommel, Belgium
- Villanueva de Castellón, Spain

Condega

- Ansfelden, Austria
- Banyoles, Spain
- Bend, United States
- Löhne, Germany

Corinto

- Bremen, Germany
- Cologne, Germany

== E ==
Estelí

- Bielefeld, Germany
- Delft, Netherlands
- Sant Feliu de Llobregat, Spain
- Sheffield, England, United Kingdom
- Stavanger, Norway

== G ==
Granada

- Badajoz, Spain
- Dos Hermanas, Spain
- Frankfurt am Main, Germany
- Santa Tecla, El Salvador
- Terrassa, Spain

== J ==
Jalapa

- Boulder, United States
- Champigny-sur-Marne, France
- Dison, Belgium
- Santa Coloma de Gramenet, Spain
- Vista Hermosa, Mexico

El Jícaro

- Yellow Springs, United States

Jinotega

- Cornellà de Llobregat, Spain
- Solingen, Germany

Jinotepe

- Santa Cruz, United States

Juigalpa

- Ann Arbor, United States
- Leiden, Netherlands

== L ==
Larreynaga

- Columbia County, United States
- Pittsfield, United States
- Rhinebeck, United States

León

- Alicante, Spain
- Berkeley, United States
- Gettysburg, United States
- Hamburg, Germany
- León, Mexico
- Londrina, Brazil
- Lund, Sweden
- New Haven, United States
- Oxford, England, United Kingdom
- Salzburg, Austria
- Zaragoza, Spain

La Libertad

- Doetinchem, Netherlands

== M ==
Managua

- Hialeah, United States
- L'Hospitalet de Llobregat, Spain
- Madrid, Spain
- Puebla, Mexico
- Quito, Ecuador
- Rio de Janeiro, Brazil
- São Bernardo do Campo, Brazil
- (Georgia (country)) Sukhumi, Georgia
- Taipei, Taiwan
- Yekaterinburg, Russia

Masaya

- Belo Horizonte, Brazil
- Cartago, Costa Rica
- Dietzenbach, Germany
- Leicester, England, United Kingdom
- Nijmegen, Netherlands

Matagalpa

- Gainesville, United States
- Sabadell, Spain
- Tilburg, Netherlands
- Wuppertal, Germany

Matiguás

- Saarlouis, Germany

Moyogalpa

- Bainbridge Island, United States
- Herne, Germany

== N ==
Nagarote

- Norwalk, United States

Nueva Guinea

- Hernani, Spain
- Sint-Truiden, Belgium

== O ==
Ocotal

- Alingsås, Sweden
- La Courneuve, France
- Hartford, United States
- Rubí, Spain
- Santa Fe, Spain
- Swindon, England, United Kingdom
- Wiesbaden, Germany

== P ==
La Paz Centro

- Amherst, United States
- Montcada i Reixac, Spain

Posoltega

- Bloomington, United States

Puerto Cabezas

- Burlington, United States
- Luleå, Sweden
- Sant Pere de Ribes, Spain
- Vilafranca del Penedès, Spain

Puerto Morazán

- Bristol, England, United Kingdom

== Q ==
Quezalguaque

- Brookline, United States

Quilalí

- Salt, Spain
- South Haven, United States

== R ==
El Rama

- Maastricht, Netherlands

El Realejo

- Cologne, Germany

Rivas

- Belén, Costa Rica
- Offenbach am Main, Germany

== S ==
San Carlos

- Albacete, Spain
- Badalona, Spain
- Bologna, Italy
- Erlangen, Germany
- Groningen, Netherlands
- Linz, Austria
- Nuremberg, Germany
- Witten, Germany

San Francisco Libre

- Reading, England, United Kingdom

San Isidro

- Pittsburgh, United States

San José de Bocay

- Blacksburg, United States

San José de los Remates

- Cortona, Italy

San Juan de Cinco Pinos

- Mollet del Vallès, Spain

San Juan de Oriente

- Sacramento, United States

San Juan del Sur

- Giessen, Germany
- Newton, United States
- Torroella de Montgrí, Spain

San Marcos

- Biel/Bienne, Switzerland
- Helmond, Netherlands
- Jena, Germany

San Miguelito

- Sant Boi de Llobregat, Spain
- Waltrop, Germany

San Pedro de Lóvago

- Gennep, Netherlands

San Rafael del Norte

- San Rafael, United States

San Rafael del Sur

- Friedrichshain-Kreuzberg (Berlin), Germany

Santa Teresa

- Richland Center, United States

Santo Tomás

- Mol, Belgium
- Thurston County, United States

Somotillo

- Bennington, United States
- Sant Fost de Campsentelles, Spain

Somoto

- Fougères, France
- Lasarte-Oria, Spain
- Laudio/Llodio, Spain
- Leganés, Spain
- Merced, United States

== T ==
Telpaneca

- Inca, Spain

Ticuantepe

- Mairena del Aljarafe, Spain

La Trinidad

- Delémont, Switzerland
- Moers, Germany

== V ==
El Viejo

- Norwich, England, United Kingdom

Villa El Carmen

- Moscow, United States

Villanueva

- Montornès del Vallès, Spain

== W ==
Waslala

- Dorsten, Germany

Wiwilí de Jinotega

- Freiburg im Breisgau, Germany
