= Nueva Segovia =

Nueva Segovia (Spanish for "New Segovia") may refer to:

- Archdiocese of Nueva Segovia, a Roman Catholic archdiocese in the Philippines
- Barquisimeto, Venezuela, originally founded as Nueva Segovia de Barquisimeto
- Lal-lo, Cagayan, Philippines, formerly known as Nueva Segovia
- Nueva Segovia, a Spanish colonial settlement founded in 1543 in present-day Quilalí, Nicaragua, now Ocotal
- Nueva Segovia Department, a department of Nicaragua
- Nueva Segovia suburb, a suburb of Segovia, Spain
