= Nueva Segovia Department =

Department of Nicaragua

Coordinates: 13°45′25″N 86°11′06″W

Nueva Segovia
- Department
- Flag

- Country: Nicaragua
- Capital: Ocotal
- Largest city: Jalapa

Area
  - Department: 3,491 km^{2} (1,348 sq mi)

Population (2021 estimate)
  - Department: 275,291
  - Density: 78.86/km^{2} (204.2/sq mi)
  - Urban: 131,619
- ISO 3166-2: NI-NS

Nueva Segovia (Spanish pronunciation: [ˈnweβa seˈɣoβja]) is a department in Nicaragua. It covers an area of 3,491km^{2} and has a population of 275,291 (2021 estimate). Nueva Segovia is also home to the indigenous Chorotegas and Nahuas. The capital is Ocotal.

== History of Las Segovias ==
Las Segovias is a region encompassed by the five departments of northern Nicaragua: Estelí, Jinotega, Madriz, Matagalpa, and Nueva Segovia. The natural boundaries are bordered on the north by the mountains around Dipilto, Jalapa and Mozonte, which extend to the Coco River. On the southern border, the area is bounded by the mountains around the towns of La Trinidad and San Nicolás, which sweep downward to the valleys between Sébaco and El Sauce. Towards the east the river valleys bordering La Concordia, Jinotega, San Sebastián de Yalí and Wiwilí de Jinotega form the demarcations of the natural boundary.

Finally, on the west the boundary extends from the slope of a mountainous triangle which extends to the coastal plain adjacent to the Pacific Ocean encompassing Estelí, San José de Cusmapa, and San Juan de Limay.

In pre-Columbian times, the region was inhabited by Native American people known as Mayangnas and Matagalpas. Later, arrivals include the Nahua from Mexico and the Chorotega peoples from Cholula. One of the first regions of Nicaragua to be colonized by the Spaniards, the conquistadors established the city of Vieja and later Antigua, to implement the Corregimiento system over the indigenous inhabitants. The corregidor served as a type of mayor to administrate a district, exploiting the local populations to mine gold and other minerals for Spain. The Spanish period decimated the indigenous population reducing its numbers from estimates of 75,000 people to 4,500 at the end of their occupation.

After gaining its independence, Nicaragua drafted the Constitution of 1858, which established seven departments: Chinandega, Chontales, Granada, León, Matagalpa, Nueva Segovia, and Rivas. The Department of Jinotega was created from Matagalpa in 1892. Simultaneously, the Estelí Department was created from Nueva Segovia. Nueva Segovia was further divided in 1936 with the creation of the Madriz Department.

In 1926, during the United States occupation of Nicaragua Las Segovias became the center of the guerrilla warfare led by Augusto César Sandino, who established a network of espionage agents and collaborators from the local population. In 1933, during the negotiations for peace in the region, Sandino asked newly elected president Juan Bautista Sacasa to create a large autonomous department covering the area of Las Segovias. Sandino's plan would have allowed him to administer the department and manage the civilian and military authorities. The government rejected the plan, giving the rebels only a small colony on the banks of the Coco River, where the former troops were allowed to farm.

== Municipalities ==
1. Ciudad Antigua
2. Dipilto
3. El Jícaro
4. Jalapa
5. Macuelizo
6. Mozonte
7. Murra
8. Ocotal
9. Quilalí
10. San Fernando
11. Santa María
12. Wiwilí de Nueva Segovia
