= Battle of Sapotillal =

Battle during the Sandino Rebellion

- Part of the United States occupation of Nicaragua, Banana Wars
Date	8–9 October 1927
Location	Sapotillal ridge, Nicaragua
Result	Sandinista victory: American-Nicaraguan rescue attempt fails.; Heavy casualties inflicted on the Sandinistas.

Belligerents
United States; Nicaragua	Sandinistas

Commanders and leaders
(United States) Lt. George J. O'Shea	(Nicaragua) Unknown

Strength
9 marines 1 sailor 10 national guard	400 guerrillas (conservative estimate)

Casualties and losses
2 USMC POWS Killed & 4 national guard killed	40–60 killed 1 captured

The Battle of Sapotillal, or the Battle of Zapotillal or Zapotillo Ridge, took place on the 9 October 1927 during the American occupation of Nicaragua of 1926–1933 and the Sandino Rebellion. The battle was an unsuccessful attempt by American and Nicaraguan government forces to rescue two downed American airmen.

== Background ==
On the 8 October 1927, USMC aviators Second Lieutenant Earl Thomas and his observer-gunner Sergeant Frank Dowdell, flying a Vought O2U Corsair, of squadron VO-8M, had to crash-land on a Nicaraguan ridge known as Sapotillal for unknown reasons. After destroying the plane and its machine guns, the two American Marine airmen started to head for Quilalí on foot, using a map dropped by their wingman, Mike "the Polish Warhorse" Wodarczyk. On their journey, the two aviators managed to fight off a group of fifteen Sandinistas with their pistols, killing five. After being surrounded by forty guerrillas and running out of ammunition, Thomas and Dowdell were finally captured. The two Americans were put on trial by the Sandinistas, "probably tortured," and executed.

== Battle ==
"Twelve miles north at Jícaro," Lieutenant George J. O'Shea, not knowing the fates of the two airmen, organized an expedition of eight other American Marines, ten Nicaraguan National Guardsmen, and one member of the United States Navy (Dr. John B. O'Neill) to rescue them. The patrol headed out at 12:45 p.m. on the 8 October 1927.

Early the following day, the group neared the crash site, only to be only ambushed by "about 200" Sandinista rebels. Rather than seize the guerrilla-occupied hill in front them, O'Shea's men turned back the way they had come and proceeded to attack the rebels blocking their way. Notably employing rifle grenades and hand grenades, the American and Nicaraguan government troops began shooting and blasting their way back to El Jícaro. Initially, O'Shea led the way, hurling grenades as he advanced. One member of the Nicaraguan National Guard continued firing "his rifle after half of the barrel had been blown off." At one point during the intense running battle, a Sandinista machine gun pinned down its enemies, who eventually killed the machine gunner with a very well-placed rifle grenade. O'Shea's troops could hear guerrillas closing in "[f]rom all sides in the dense jungle." A Thompson submachine gun and rifle grenades were used quite effectively by the Americans and their Nicaraguan allies, "demonstrating the high value of these two weapons in close-range bush warfare." The firefight lasted about two and a half hours.

== Aftermath ==
Although their native guides had abandoned them during the fight and O'Shea had lost his compass, the exhausted patrol arrived back in El Jícaro "just before midnight" on the 10 October.

O'Shea guessed that the total number of Sandinistas engaged in the battle was about 400, although he said this was a "very conservative estimate." Of these, at least 40 were killed or mortally wounded, but this number could actually be as high as 55 or 60. One rebel was captured during the fighting, and his captors were prepared to shoot him, but decided not to, as it might give away their position. Of O'Shea's men, four Nicaraguan National Guardsmen were killed.
