= Wiwilí =

Wiwilí may refer to:

- Wiwilí de Jinotega, Nicaragua
- Wiwilí de Nueva Segovia, Nicaragua
