= Estelí Department =

Coordinates: 13°05′00″N 86°21′00″W

Estelí Departamento de Estelí
- Department
- Flag Coat of arms

- Country: Nicaragua
- Capital: Estelí

Area
  - Total: 2,230 km^{2} (860 sq mi)

Population (2023 estimate)
  - Total: 233,077
  - Density: 105/km^{2} (271/sq mi)
- ISO 3166-2: NI-ES

Esteli is an administrative division and department in northern Nicaragua. The city of Estelí serves as the capital of the department. Situated on the Pan American Highway, it forms the gateway to the Las Segovia region and northern Honduras. The valleys in the department form an important center of tobacco cultivation, and the associated cigar industry.

== History ==
Several carved-stone figures from pre-historic human habitation has been found in the region. The city of Esteli developed as a Spanish colonial settlement. In 1978–79, the region was part of the battle between the government forces and Sandinista guerrillas during the final phase of the Nicaraguan Revolution, and resulted in significant destruction.

== Geography ==
Esteli is one of the 15 departments of Nicaragua, located in the northern part of the country. It is spread over an area of 2,230 km^{2} (860 sq mi). Its capital, Esteli, is located on the Pan American Highway. It is situated at an altitude of 800 m (2,600 ft), in a valley in the central highlands of Nicaragua, along the Esteli river. It lies approximately 150 km (93 mi) from the capital Managua and functions as the gateway to the Las Segovia region, which includes the departments of Nueva Segovia and Madriz, and parts of northern Honduras. There are several wildlife parks and national reserves in the department.

The department consists of six municipalities–Condega, Estelí, La Trinidad, Pueblo Nuevo, San Juan de Limay, and San Nicolás.

== Demographics and economy ==
As per 2023 estimate, Estelí has a population of 233,077 inhabitants. The department’s economy is centered on agriculture and allied industries, with the city of Esteli functioning as a principal commercial center. Despite its difficult terrain, people engage in livestock rearing and grow crops such as coffee, sesame, cotton, and other fruits around the Esteli region. Tobacco is extensively cultivated in Esteli and its surrounding valleys, which are used for cigar production, used for both domestic consumption and export. The city of Estelí hosts a central park with gardens exhibiting monumental monoliths and Pre-Columbian archaeological pieces, the cathedral of Estelí, and statues of San Francisco de Asís and Santo Domingo. The Sandino Route is a local development and historical project dedicated to Augusto César Sandino, which incorporates multiple communities and sites in the department.
