= Murra, Nueva Segovia =

Murra
- Municipality
- Location in Nicaragua
- Coordinates: 13°46′N 86°01′W
- Country: Nicaragua
- Department: Nueva Segovia Department

Area
  - Municipality: 205.0 sq mi (530.9 km^{2})

Population (2005)
  - Municipality: 12,346
  - Density: 60.23/sq mi (23.25/km^{2})
  - Urban: 543

Murra is a municipality in the Nueva Segovia Department of Nicaragua.

Murra is a small municipal head in eastern Nueva Segovia department. The tiny pueblo has a population of approximately 1,000 inhabitants and is made up of four barrios (neighborhoods) squeezed into a narrow valley, high up in the mountains. The people in Murra make their living primarily from farming corn and beans, and raising coffee. Although its population is small, Murra is the center for many rural communities: about 17,000 people in total live throughout the entire municipal region. So, many people also make a living as shop owners and vendors. Situated in a high mountainous region, Murra's climate is significantly cooler than much of Nicaragua. Murra has electricity and a running water system. There are several pulperias (shops) in Murra, three comedores (restaurants) and two hospedajes (very small hotels). The community has one Catholic parrish church, and two Protestant temples.
