= Pueblo Nuevo, Nicaragua =

Pueblo Nuevo
- Municipality
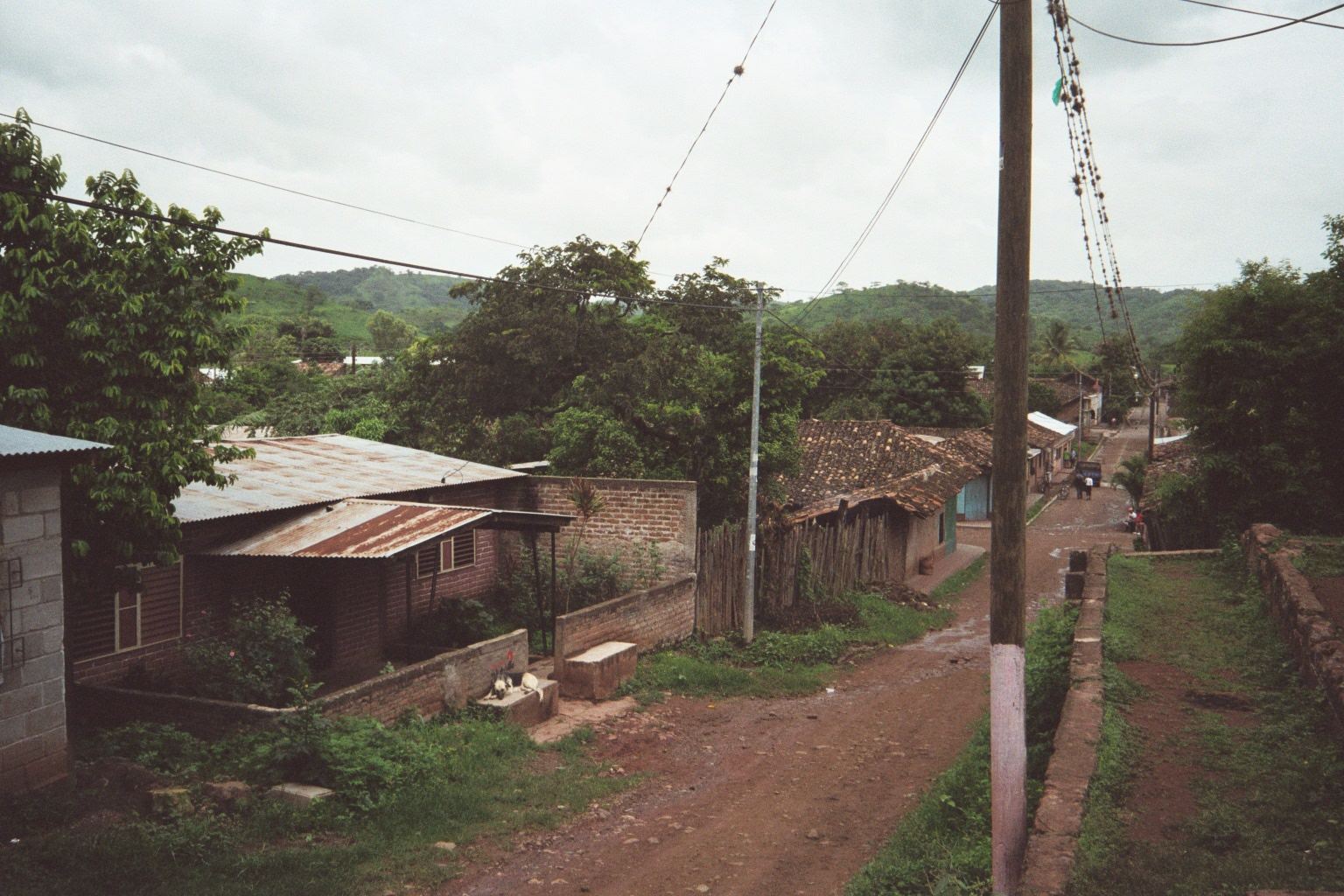
- Pueblo Nuevo in 2002

- Location in Nicaragua
- Coordinates: 13°23′N 86°29′W
- Country: Nicaragua
- Department: Estelí Department

Government
  - Mayor: Juana Canales

Area
  - Municipality: 78 sq mi (203 km^{2})

Population (2005)
  - Municipality: 20,620
  - Density: 263/sq mi (102/km^{2})
  - Urban: 3,444

Pueblo Nuevo is a municipality in the Estelí Department of Nicaragua.
