= Mozonte =

- Municipality
- Location in Nicaragua
- Coordinates: 13°39′N 86°27′W
- Country: Nicaragua
- Department: Nueva Segovia Department

Area
  - Municipality: 84 sq mi (218 km^{2})

Population (2005)
  - Municipality: 6,795
  - Density: 80.7/sq mi (31.2/km^{2})
  - Urban: 1,809

Mozonte (Spanish pronunciation: [moˈsonte]) is a municipality in the Nueva Segovia department of Nicaragua.
