= Santa María, Nicaragua =

Santa María
- Municipality
- Location in Nicaragua
- Coordinates: 13°45′N 86°43′W
- Country: Nicaragua
- Department: Nueva Segovia Department

Area
  - Municipality: 61 sq mi (158 km^{2})

Population (2005)
  - Municipality: 4,404
  - Density: 72.2/sq mi (27.9/km^{2})
  - Urban: 549

Santa María is a municipality in the Nueva Segovia Department of Nicaragua.
