= Wiwilí de Nueva Segovia =

Wiwilí Güigüilí
- Municipality
- Location in Nicaragua
- Coordinates: 13°37′N 85°50′W
- Country: Nicaragua
- Department: Nueva Segovia Department

Area
  - Municipality: 154 sq mi (398 km^{2})

Population (2005)
  - Municipality: 16,344
  - Density: 106/sq mi (41.1/km^{2})
  - Urban: 3,467

Wiwilí de Nueva Segovia (Spanish pronunciation: [wiwiˈli ðe ˈnweβa seˈɣoβja]) is a municipality in the Nueva Segovia Department of Nicaragua, on the west bank of the Rio Coco; Wiwilí de Jinotega is on the east bank. It borders the Bosawas National Natural Resource Reserve, the largest protected area in Central America.
