= Dipilto =

- Municipality
- Location in Nicaragua
- Coordinates: 13°43′N 86°30′W
- Country: Nicaragua
- Department: Nueva Segovia Department

Government
  - Mayor: Karla Meléndez Almendares

Area
  - Municipality: 41 sq mi (105 km^{2})

Population (2005)
  - Municipality: 5,207
  - Density: 128/sq mi (49.6/km^{2})
  - Urban: 178

Dipilto is a municipality in the Nueva Segovia Department of Nicaragua.
