= San Juan de Limay =

- Municipality
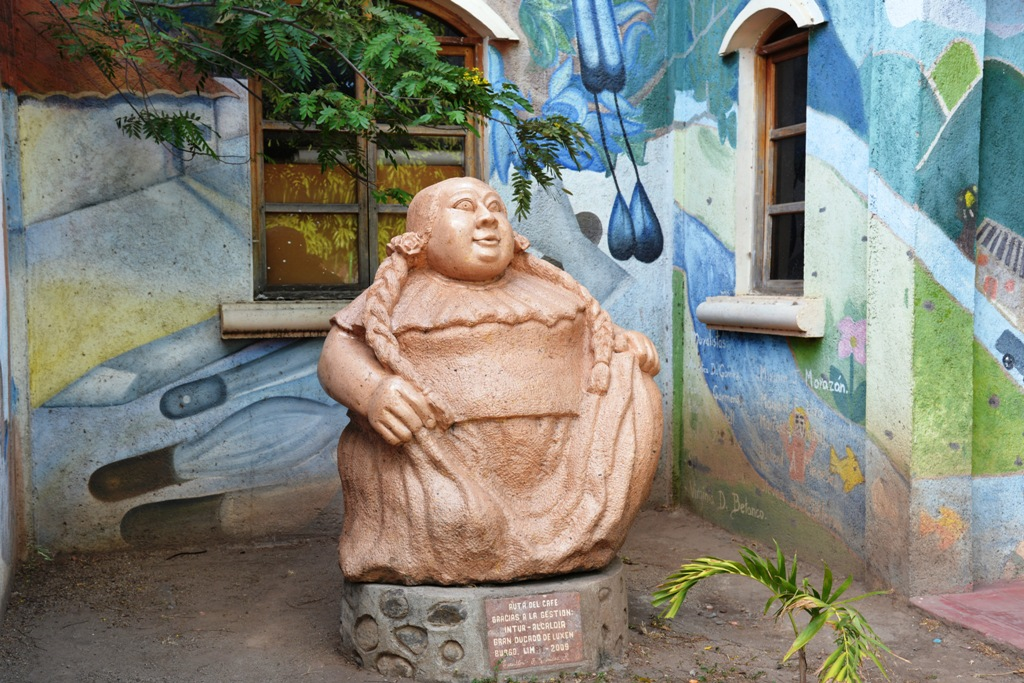

- Location in Nicaragua
- Coordinates: 13°10′N 86°37′W
- Country: Nicaragua
- Department: Estelí

Government
  - Mayor: Juan Ramón Mendoza

Area
  - Municipality: 205.0 sq mi (530.9 km^{2})

Population (2005)
  - Municipality: 17,434
  - Density: 85.05/sq mi (32.84/km^{2})
  - Urban: 3,668

San Juan de Limay is a municipality in the Estelí department of Nicaragua. It is famous for its artisan production of soapstone (marmolina) sculptures.

San Juan de Limay is located 195 km north of Managua in the north of Nicaragua only a short distance from the border of Honduras. While the elevation of the town is 281 m above sea level, the mountains that surround the valley where Limay is located, rise as high as 1400 m. The broad valley is created by the confluence of two rivers, the Queso and the Negro. Both the mountains around the area and the rivers that cross the valley isolate the town and make travel between Limay to the city of Estelí difficult. Maintenance of the roads is difficult since flooding, falling rocks, mudslides and erosion are constantly working to destroy the fragile network that connects Limay to other places.

From Estelí, the capital of the department in which Limay is situated, the route to San Juan de Limay has been reinforced with a hexagonal slab road (aka “adoquines”) as of 2021 . Leaving the town, the old yellow school buses that are the mainstay of Nicaraguan travel, move along the Pan American Highway for 10 km until reaching La Sirena. At this point the bus to Limay veers off toward “Hermanos Cruces” where the route is as scenic as ever sometimes so foggy, it is nearly un drivable. This portion of the journey stretches for 37 km toward the regions of El Pino and San Luis. At this high elevation one can see what is left of the pine groves, fields of grain are visible across the mountainsides and behind in the distance the city of Estelí. The fresh air of the northern mountains lessens the heat of the packed bus. Once the plateau is crossed, the valley of Limay comes into view at the edge of Tepiscayán, the site of where for years carvers from Limay have extracted the marmolina they used for sculpting. The trip from Estelí to Limay can take, in good weather, 45 minutes to 1 hour on the grueling windy roads. The distance from Managua to Limay is 195 km and takes about 4 hours.
