= Ciudad Antigua =

- Municipality
- Location in Nicaragua
- Coordinates: 13°38′0″N 86°19′0″W
- Country: Nicaragua
- Department: Nueva Segovia Department

Government
  - Mayor: Luis Arturo Mairena Orellana

Area
  - Land: 57 sq mi (147 km^{2})

Population
  - Municipality: 4,868
  - Urban: 3,639

Ciudad Antigua (Spanish pronunciation: [sjuˈðað anˈtiɣwa]) is a municipality in the Nueva Segovia department of Nicaragua.
