= Jalapa, Nicaragua =

Jalapa
- Municipality
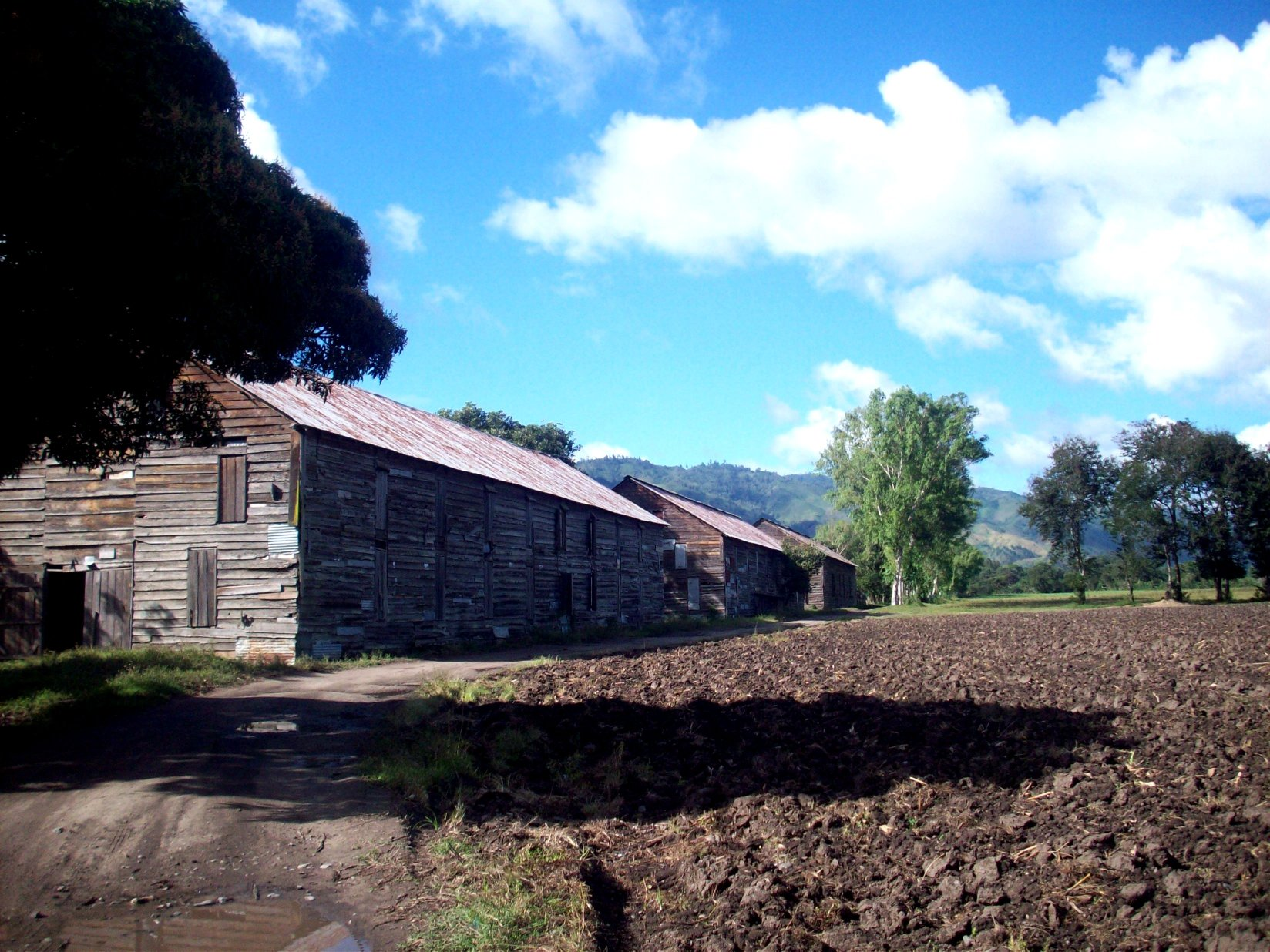

- Location in Nicaragua
- Coordinates: 13°55′N 86°08′W
- Country: Nicaragua
- Department: Nueva Segovia Department

Government
  - Mayor: Eddy Gutiérrez

Area
  - Municipality: 265 sq mi (687 km^{2})
  - Land: 243 sq mi (629 km^{2})

Population (2022 estimate)
  - Municipality: 73,965
  - Density: 305/sq mi (118/km^{2})
  - Urban: 42,765

Jalapa is a city and a municipality in the Nueva Segovia Department of Nicaragua. It is located in northern Nicaragua, close to the Honduras border.

Jalapa has been Boulder, Colorado's sister city since 1983.

== Contra war ==
Jalapa, which is located on the border of Honduras, was the location of two failed attempts of the CIA funded Contras to overthrow the city and install a provisional government, in late 1982 and December 1983, in which the CIA informed the contras would be immediately recognized by the United States Government.

== International relations ==
=== Sister city ===
Jalapa's sister city is:

- Boulder, Colorado, United States, since 1987

== See also ==
- Friendship City Project: Boulder Jalapa
