= San Nicolás, Nicaragua =

San Nicolás
- Municipality
- Location in Nicaragua
- Coordinates: 12°55′59″N 86°20′49″W
- Country: Nicaragua
- Department: Estelí

Area
  - Municipality: 63 sq mi (163 km^{2})

Population (2005)
  - Municipality: 6,768
  - Density: 108/sq mi (41.5/km^{2})
  - Urban: 6,286
- Climate: Aw

San Nicolás is a municipality in the Estelí department of Nicaragua.
