= El Jícaro, Nicaragua =

El Jícaro
- Municipality
- Location in Nicaragua
- Coordinates: 13°43′N 86°8′W
- Country: Nicaragua
- Department: Nueva Segovia Department

Government
  - Mayor: Telma Olivas

Area
  - Municipality: 166 sq mi (429 km^{2})

Population (2022 estimate)
  - Municipality: 33,013
  - Density: 199/sq mi (77.0/km^{2})
  - Urban: 10,264

El Jícaro is a municipality in the Nueva Segovia Department of Nicaragua.
