= Quilalí =

Quilalí Valle de Panlío de los Cinco Ríos
- Municipality
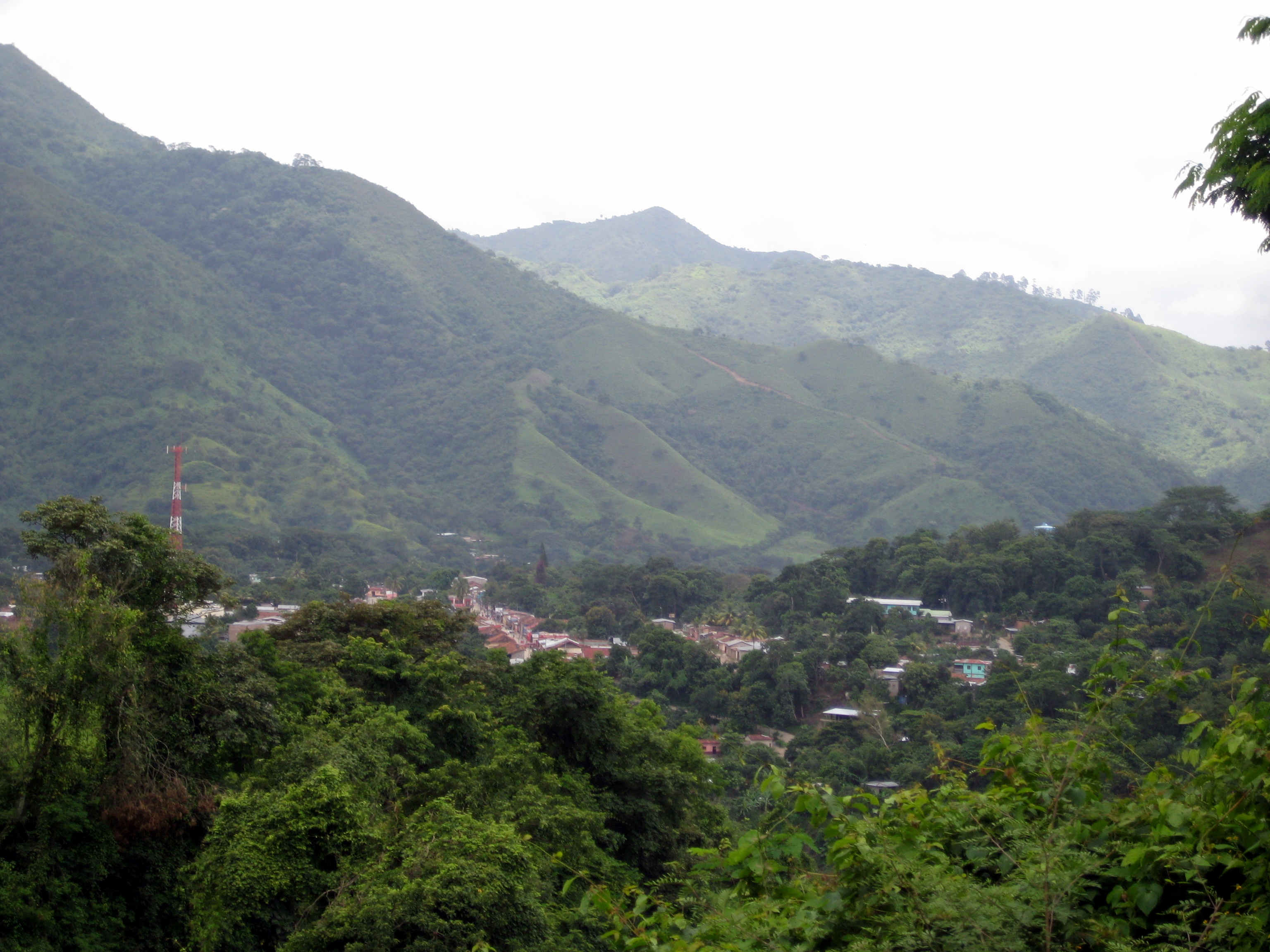
- Quilalí as seen from the highway between Ocotal and Quilalí

- Location in Nicaragua
- Coordinates: 13°34′N 86°1′W
- Country: Nicaragua
- Department: Nueva Segovia Department

Government
  - Mayor: Marvin Rodríguez

Area
  - Municipality: 131 sq mi (339 km^{2})

Population (2022 estimate)
  - Municipality: 34,889
  - Density: 267/sq mi (103/km^{2})
  - Urban: 11,252

Quilalí is a town and a municipality in the Nueva Segovia Department of Nicaragua.

== Community Background ==
Situated in a high mountainous region of Nicaragua lies Quilalí, the remote, large municipal head in the department of Nueva Segovia. It is 264 km north of Managua and 80 km east of the departmental capitol of Ocotal. The town has a population of more than 13,000 inhabitants but in the entire municipality itself, as of 2025, there are 34,889 residents. The pueblo is made of 17 barrios laid out in a cobblestone grid around a central park and 54 rural communities. The people in Quilalí make their living primarily in basic grains farming (corn and beans) as well as coffee cultivation.

In contrast to all its soil riches, the people of Quilalí are poor. Unemployment and underemployment are high and continue to grow.

Goods are also more costly here than in other parts of the country. The town is isolated from its economically prosperous neighbors by rough terrain including mountains and rivers that swell to overtake the highway during rainy season, making transportation of goods to the town costly.

Families also tend to be large. According to the Ministry of Health, nearly twenty percent of the population is made up of women of birthing age. This, among other factors such as job scarcity and lack of culturally appropriate family planning methods, leads many families to have upwards of 5 children with only one parent working. The scarcity also causes many children to quit school early to help their families by finding whatever small jobs they can.

Not all families in Quilalí suffer. The people who belong to the national ruling government party, the Sandinistas, have more opportunities for employment. This is important because the local ruling government party in Quilalí is the Constitutionalist Liberal Party (Nicaragua). This means the local government provides jobs to one political party, while the national government provides jobs for the other. It also makes Quilalí one of the only towns where Sandinistas do not control local politics. This fact is due to the memory by most inhabitants of Quilali of the savagery of Sandino and his troops during their existence in the 1930s.

== Festivals ==
Quilalí celebrates all the Nicaraguan holidays as well as some uniquely Quilalí events. As with all Nicaraguan cities, they celebrate their Patron Saint Saint Joseph on March 19. For the week before the 19th and the weekend afterwards, the town celebrates with pilgrimages to communities within Quilalí as well as the traditional hípica, or horse parade, which is traditionally held the Sunday after the 19th. Bull rings, Ferris wheels, and makeshift bars are all common sights at the Quilalí fairgrounds around the 19th.

Another Quilalí celebration takes place in the largest rural community within the municipality, San Bartolo. San Bartolo hosts the annual Corn Festival, where all things corn are celebrated, including tamales, puddings and of course, corn alcohol. All these foods are found for sale by local cooks and are judged by two or more judges. The alcohol tends to be judged by all willing male participants. The festival also features floats prepared by the local high school, a soccer tournament, and a dance benefiting the graduating class.

== Climate ==
Climate data for Quilalí (1961–1990)
Month	Jan	Feb	Mar	Apr	May	Jun	Jul	Aug	Sep	Oct	Nov	Dec	Year
Mean daily maximum °C (°F)	31.6 (88.9)	33.1 (91.6)	36.1 (97.0)	36.1 (97.0)	34.9 (94.8)	34.3 (93.7)	31.9 (89.4)	31.1 (88.0)	32.5 (90.5)	32.5 (90.5)	32.0 (89.6)	29.6 (85.3)	33.0 (91.4)
Daily mean °C (°F)	22.8 (73.0)	23.4 (74.1)	24.8 (76.6)	26.2 (79.2)	26.9 (80.4)	25.8 (78.4)	24.8 (76.6)	24.3 (75.7)	25.3 (77.5)	25.1 (77.2)	24.0 (75.2)	23.0 (73.4)	24.7 (76.5)
Mean daily minimum °C (°F)	12.5 (54.5)	12.5 (54.5)	13.5 (56.3)	15.0 (59.0)	17.9 (64.2)	18.4 (65.1)	17.9 (64.2)	17.2 (63.0)	18.3 (64.9)	17.0 (62.6)	14.7 (58.5)	12.7 (54.9)	15.6 (60.1)
Average precipitation mm (inches)	27 (1.1)	14 (0.6)	12 (0.5)	28 (1.1)	107 (4.2)	233 (9.2)	224 (8.8)	205 (8.1)	226 (8.9)	223 (8.8)	71 (2.8)	39 (1.5)	1,409 (55.5)
Average precipitation days (≥ 1.0 mm)	6	4	3	3	8	19	21	19	20	19	11	10	143
Source: NOAA

== Sports ==
Baseball is also widely popular, especially during the Quilalí Municipal Championships.

== Twin towns – sister cities ==
Quilalí is twinned with:

- Salt, Spain
- South Haven, United States

== Gallery ==
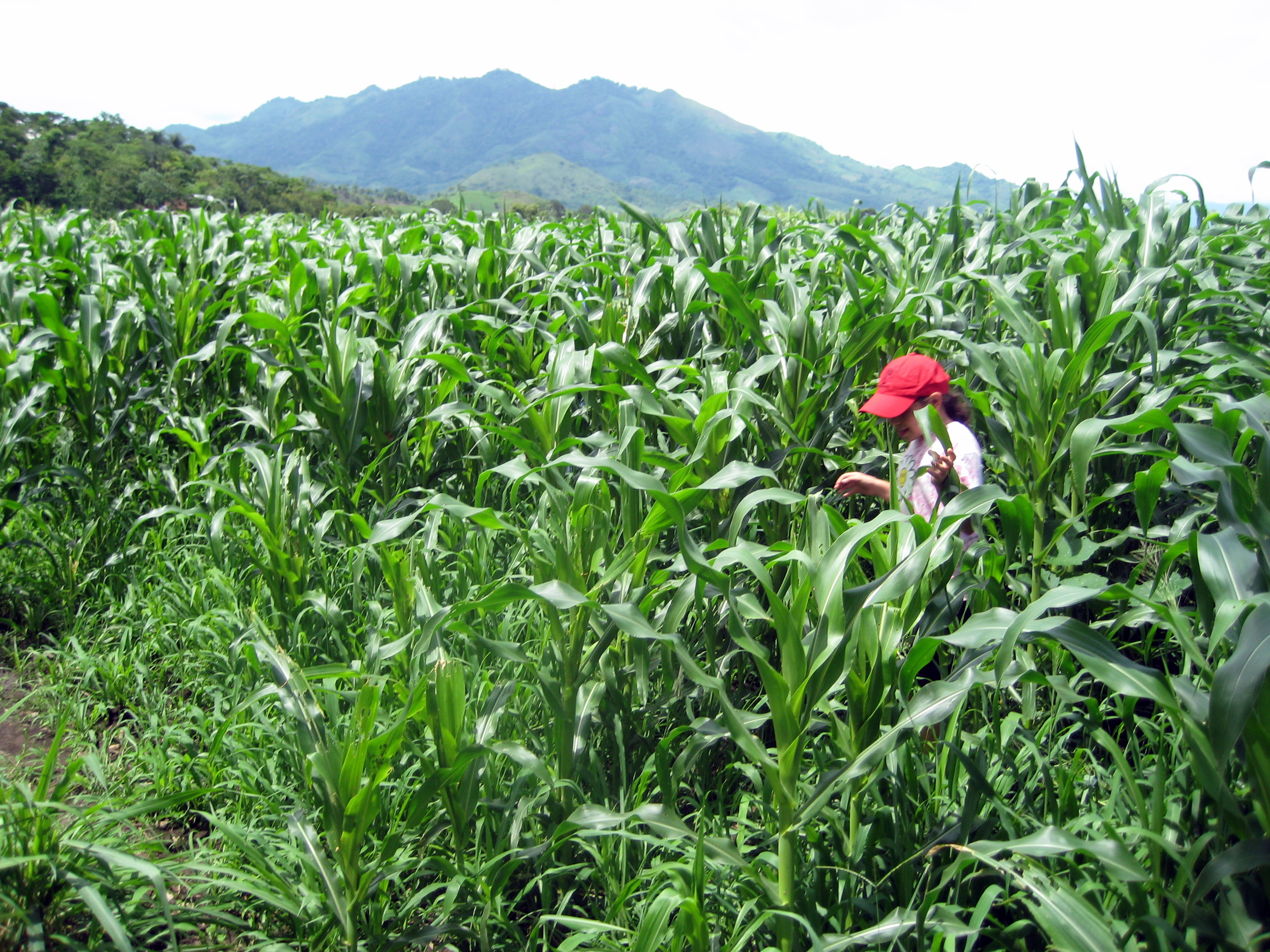
A corn field in a rural community of Quilalí.

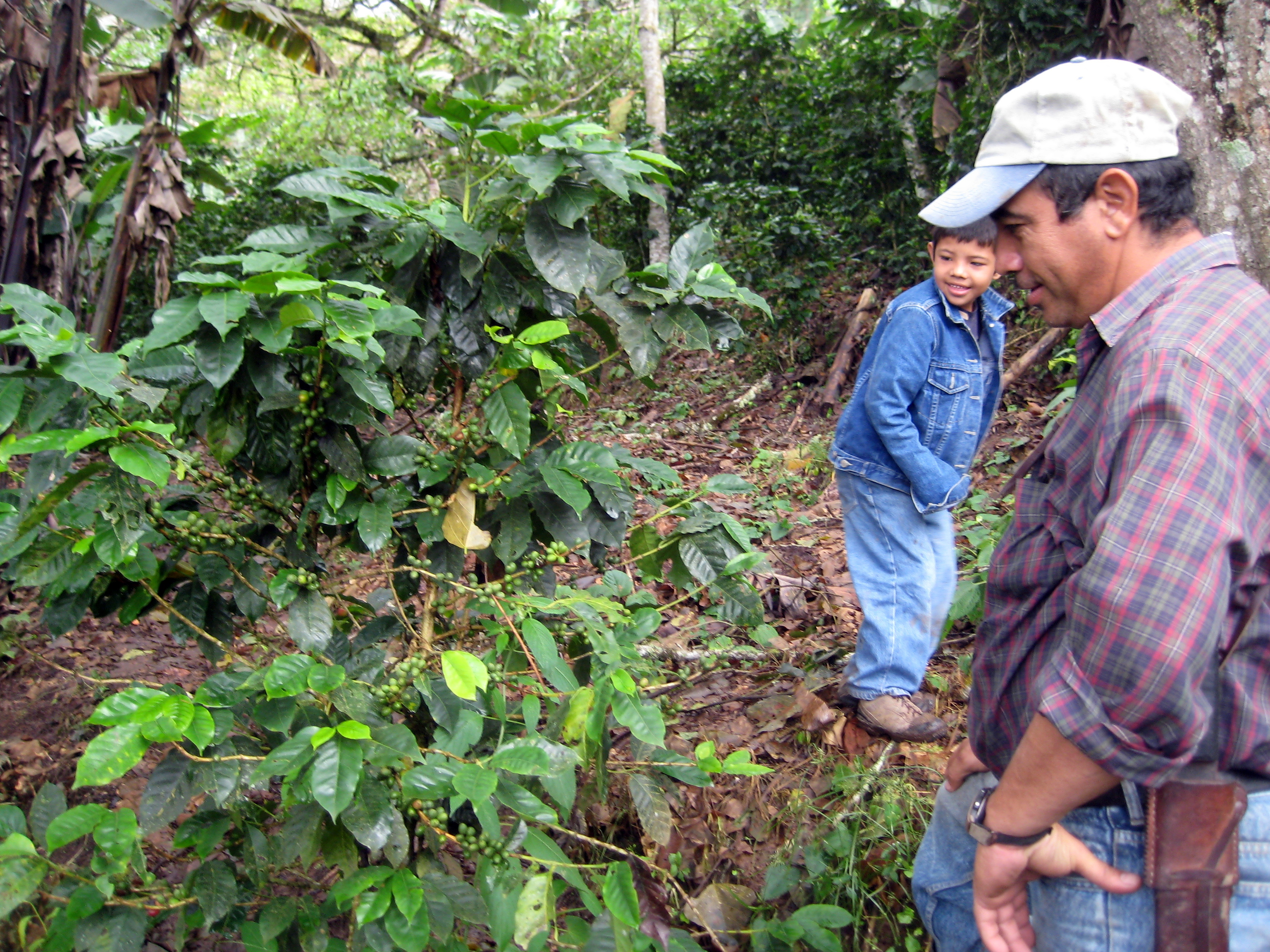
A farmer on his small coffee farm in the highlands of Quilalí

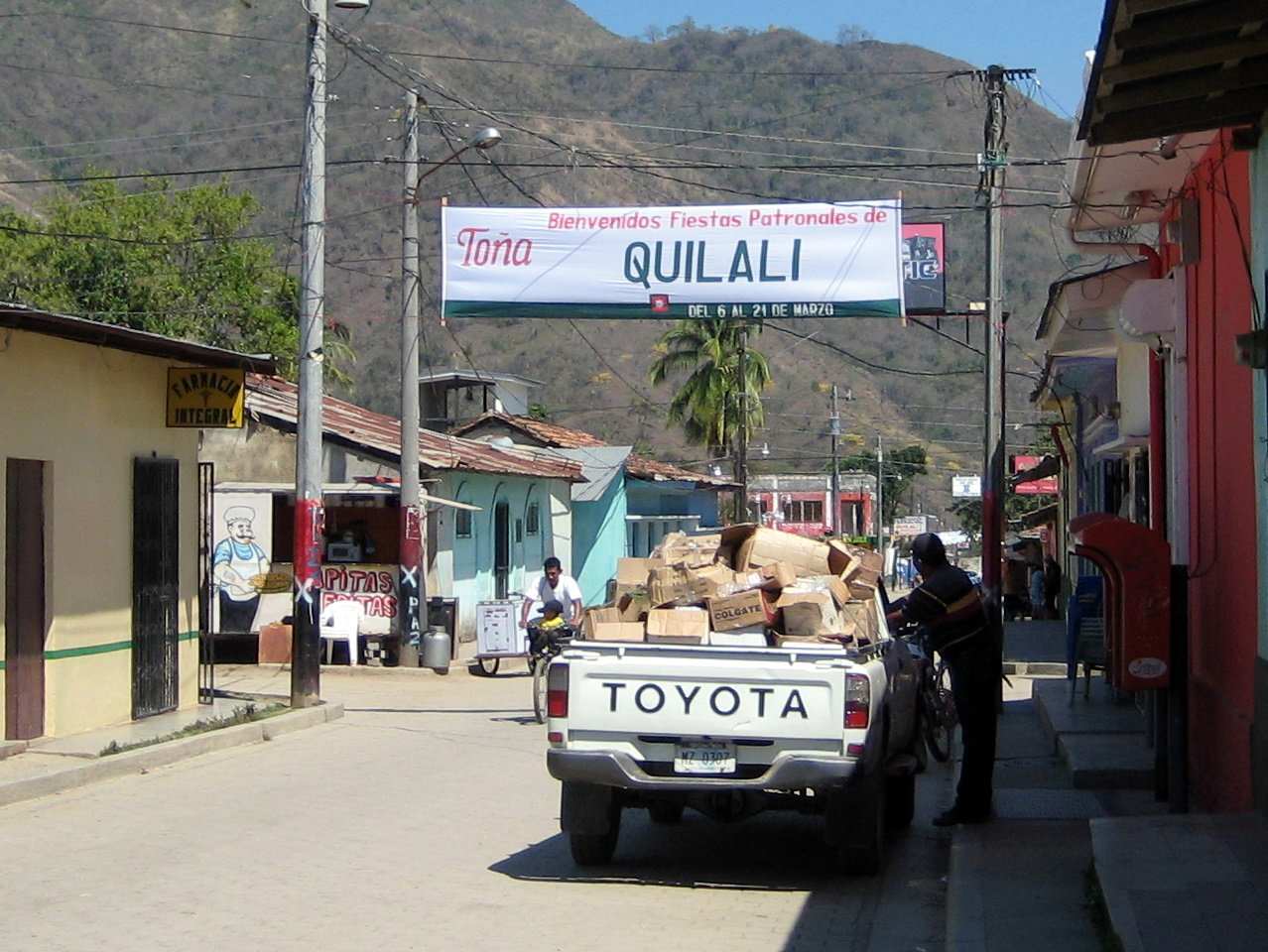
Main Street into town during Fiestas Patronales.

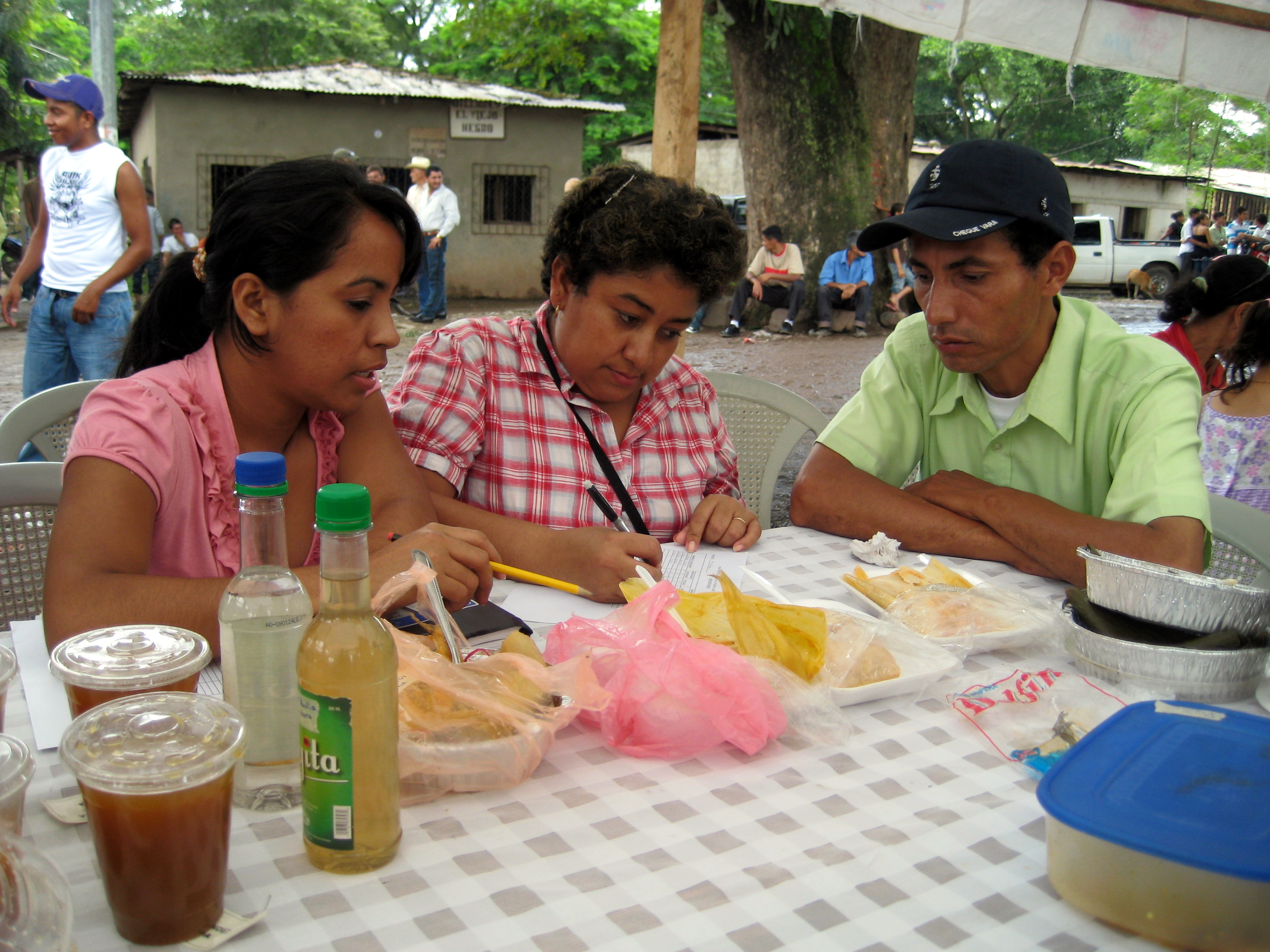
Judging the Nacatamales at the San Bartolo Corn Festival 2010.

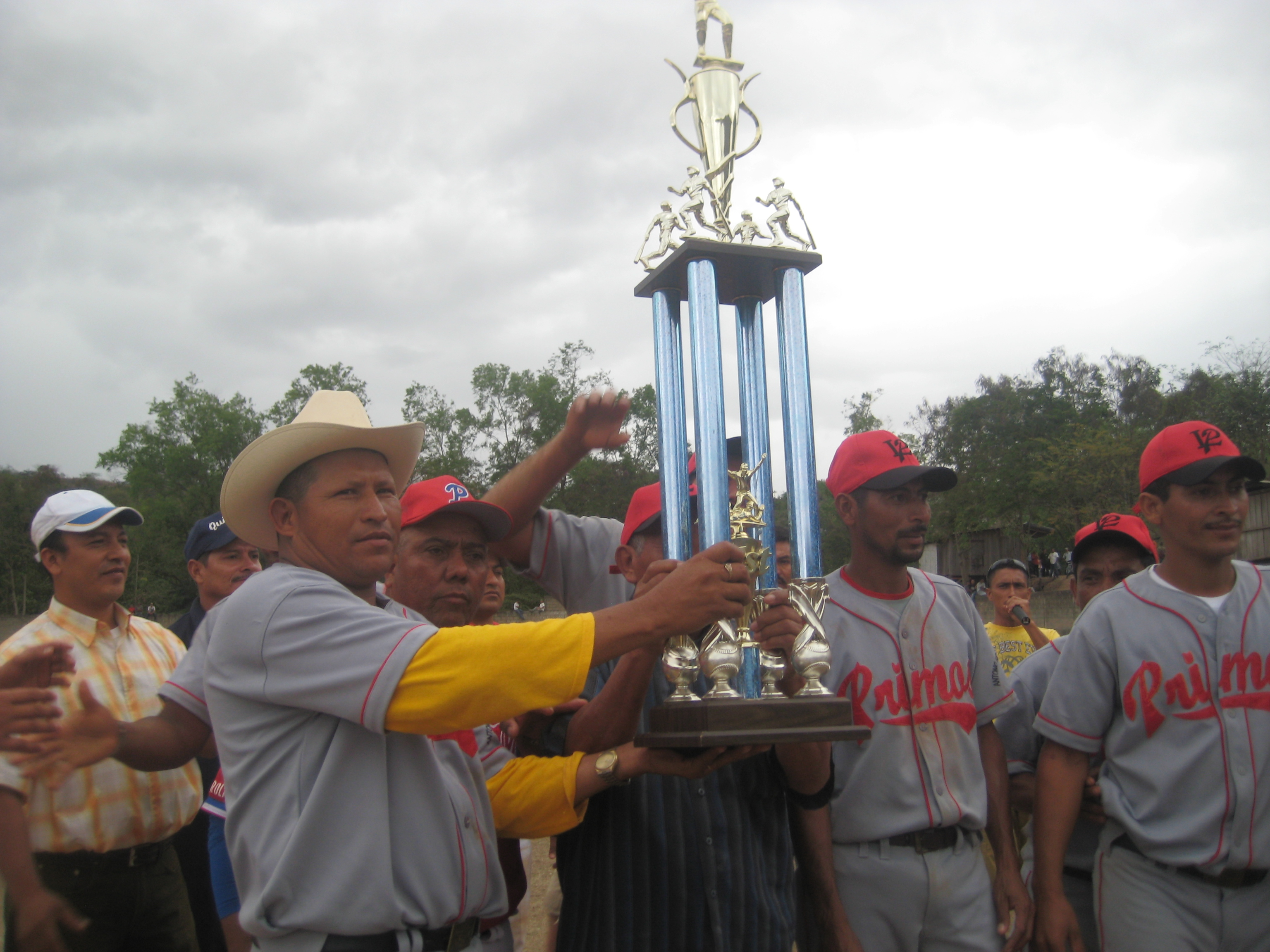
2011 Municipal Baseball Champions, Los Primos.

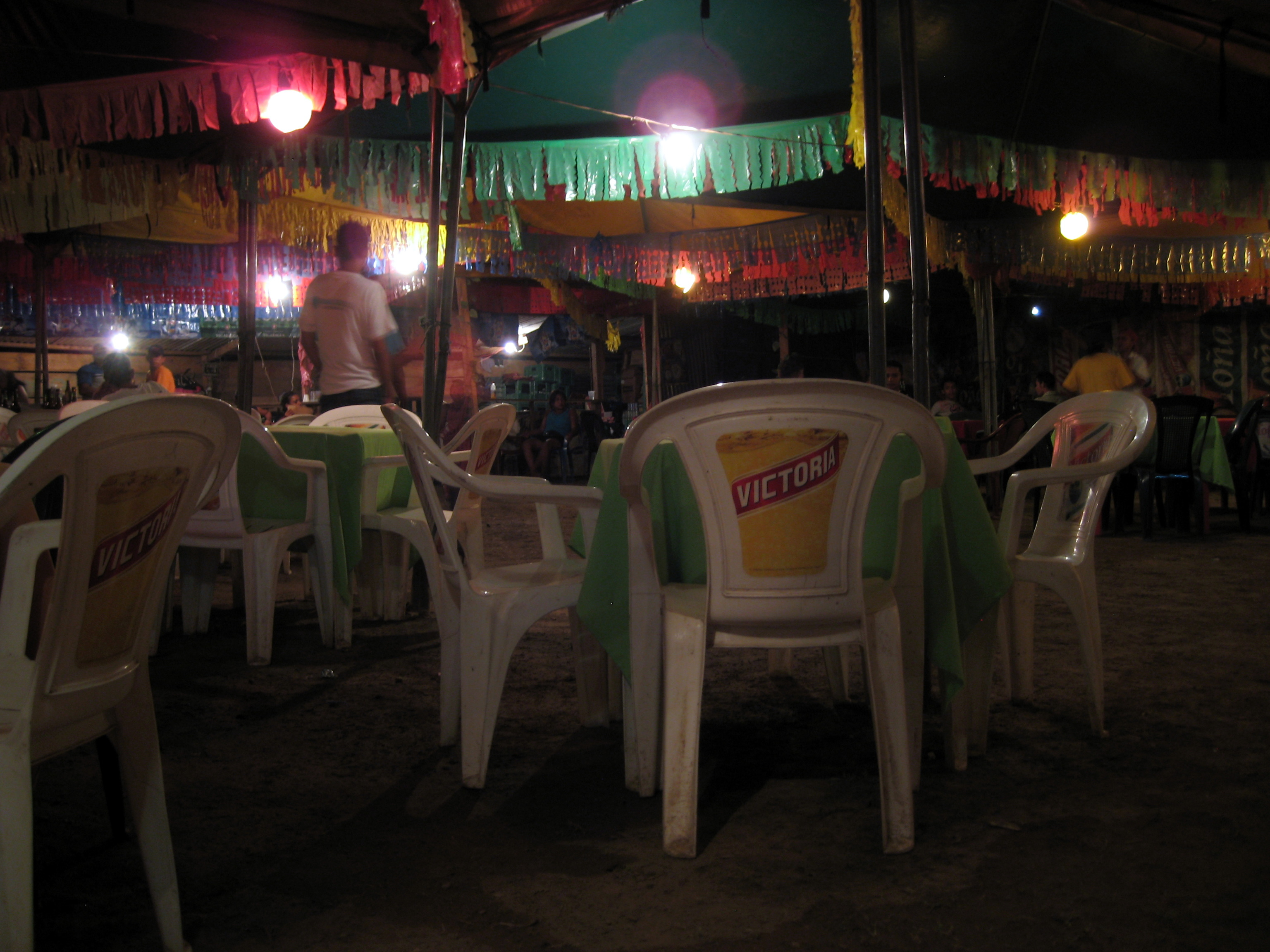
A makeshift bar at the plaza during Fiestas Patronales.
