= La Trinidad, Nicaragua =

La Trinidad
- Municipality
- Location in Nicaragua
- Coordinates: 12°58′10″N 86°14′12″W
- Country: Nicaragua
- Department: Estelí

Area
  - Municipality: 100 sq mi (270 km^{2})

Population (2022 estimate)
  - Municipality: 22,645
  - Density: 220/sq mi (84/km^{2})
  - Urban: 13,011
- Climate: Aw

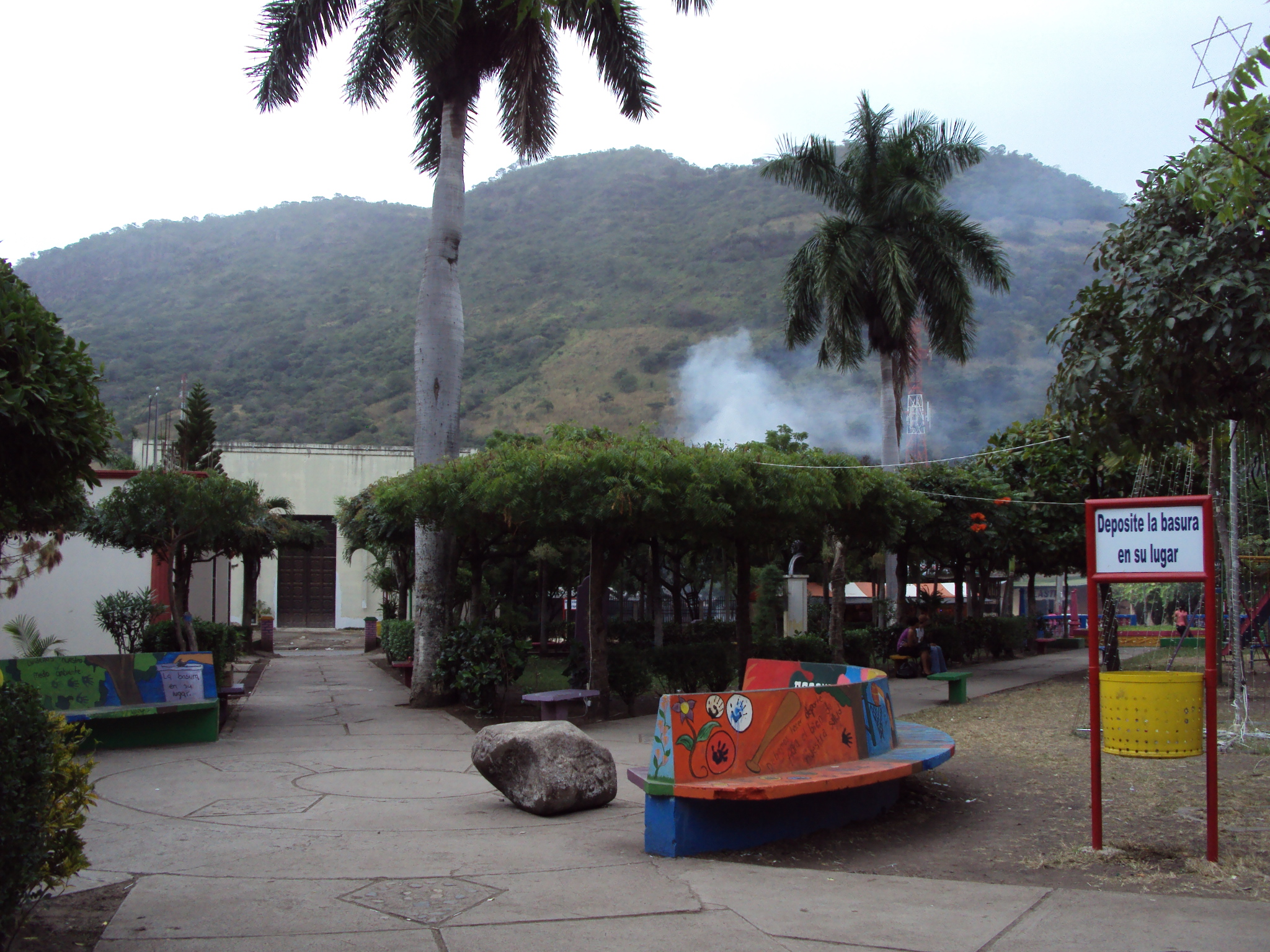
Héctor Eugenio Mairena Miranda Park, La Trinidad, Nicaragua

La Trinidad (Spanish pronunciation: [la tɾiniˈðað]) is a town and a municipality in the Estelí department of Nicaragua.
