= Ocotal =

Ocotal La Sultana del Norte
- Municipality
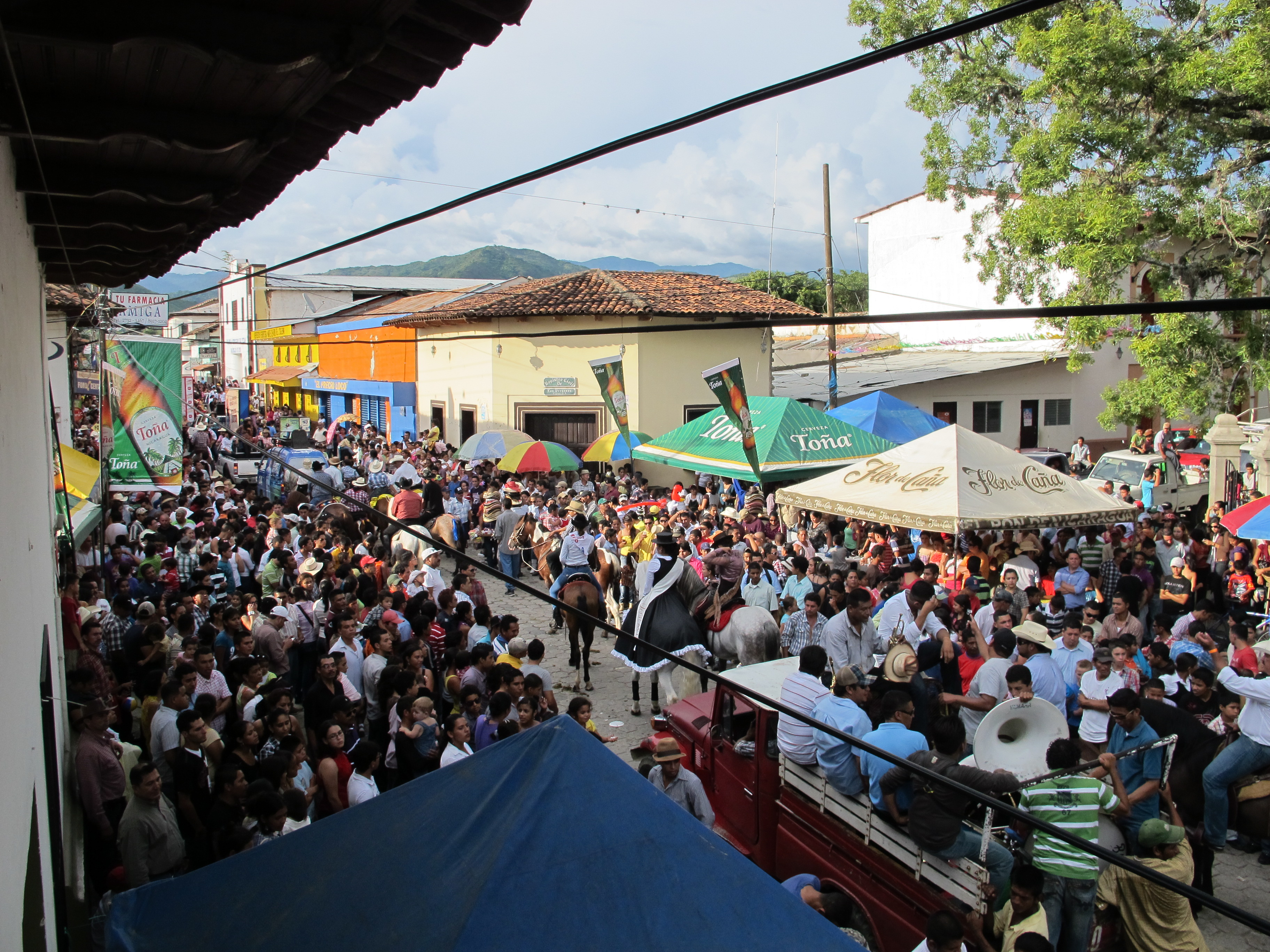
- Downtown Ocotal

- Seal

- Ocotal in Nueva Segovia

- Location in Nicaragua
- Coordinates: 13°38′N 86°29′W
- Country: Nicaragua
- Department: Nueva Segovia Department

Area
  - Municipality: 85.2 km^{2} (32.9 sq mi)

Population (2022 estimate)
  - Municipality: 50,178
  - Density: 589/km^{2} (1,530/sq mi)
  - Urban: 48,765
  - Summer (DST): UTC]
- Climate: Aw

Ocotal (Spanish pronunciation: [okoˈtal]) is the capital of the Nueva Segovia Department in Nicaragua, Central America and the municipal seat of Ocotal Municipality.

== History ==
The region occupied by the city of Ocotal was formerly occupied by different ethnic groups that had probably migrated from Mexico to Central America many centuries ago, speaking a variety of Nahuatl.

The gold deposits that were found on the banks of the Choluteca River and other places, motivated the establishment of Spanish settlements. The city was founded in 1543 under the name of Nueva Segovia but this was later changed to Ocotal, a Nahuatl word that means "pine resin".

In 1927, Ocotal suffered one of the first dive bombing attacks in history during a battle that pitted the American Marines and the Nicaraguan National Guard against Sandinista rebels.

During the 2009 Honduran constitutional crisis, ousted Honduran president Manuel Zelaya set up a government-in-exile in the city briefly in July during reconciliation negotiations with coup leaders.

== Description ==
Ocotal is the capital of the Nueva Segovia Department in Nicaragua. The main production is coffee, and lumbering. The city, with a population of 39,450 (as of 2000), is located in a valley. The name comes from the nahuatl root "ocotl" for pine resin, and the Spanish suffix "al", due to the abundance of ocote pines. Ocotal was the third Spanish colony (after León and Granada) founded in what would eventually be called the Province of Nicaragua and Costa Rica. Its original name was Nueva Ciudad Segovia (New Segovia) and its foundation is credited to Rodrigo de Contreras in 1543.

Attractions include the Dipilto-Jalapa pine forests to the north, the Segovia River (775 km or 482 mi long) to the south, the indigenous and artisan town of Mozonte, as well as multiple hiking opportunities around its picturesque mountains. The old town center has some of the oldest colonial buildings in the region, such as the Asuncion Parrish Church, as well as Plaza Central, a garden in the middle of the commercial center featuring hundreds of species of flowers and tropical plants. Due to its valley location and close proximity to Nicaragua's highest mountains, Ocotal enjoys cool weather, avoiding the extreme heat of the Pacific Zone in western Nicaragua, additional activities also include hiking Mount Guásara, flowing from Segovia or Coco River to the bridge, visiting coffee plantations, and a trip to El Rosario waterfalls.

== Geography ==
Characterised by steep hills in the north and south, plateaus in the west and a valley in the center. It lies at an altitude of 500 metres (1,640 feet) above sea level.

=== Climate ===
Climate data for Ocotal (1961–1990)
Month	Jan	Feb	Mar	Apr	May	Jun	Jul	Aug	Sep	Oct	Nov	Dec	Year
Mean daily maximum °C (°F)	31.6 (88.9)	33.1 (91.6)	36.1 (97.0)	36.1 (97.0)	36.3 (97.3)	34.3 (93.7)	31.9 (89.4)	32.3 (90.1)	32.5 (90.5)	32.9 (91.2)	31.2 (88.2)	30.8 (87.4)	33.3 (91.9)
Daily mean °C (°F)	22.4 (72.3)	23.3 (73.9)	24.9 (76.8)	26.0 (78.8)	26.3 (79.3)	24.9 (76.8)	24.3 (75.7)	24.6 (76.3)	24.6 (76.3)	24.3 (75.7)	23.3 (73.9)	22.5 (72.5)	24.3 (75.7)
Mean daily minimum °C (°F)	12.0 (53.6)	12.6 (54.7)	15.0 (59.0)	17.2 (63.0)	18.9 (66.0)	18.6 (65.5)	17.6 (63.7)	17.4 (63.3)	18.1 (64.6)	16.9 (62.4)	14.3 (57.7)	12.7 (54.9)	15.9 (60.6)
Average precipitation mm (inches)	3 (0.1)	3 (0.1)	8 (0.3)	36 (1.4)	129 (5.1)	159 (6.3)	82 (3.2)	96 (3.8)	166 (6.5)	135 (5.3)	50 (2.0)	7 (0.3)	874 (34.4)
Average precipitation days (≥ 1 mm)	1	1	1	2	8	12	11	10	12	11	4	1	72
Mean monthly sunshine hours	239.0	231.2	265.0	241.4	226.8	195.0	194.3	224.9	196.1	206.8	211.2	228.3	2,660
Source: National Oceanic and Atmospheric Administration

== Administration ==
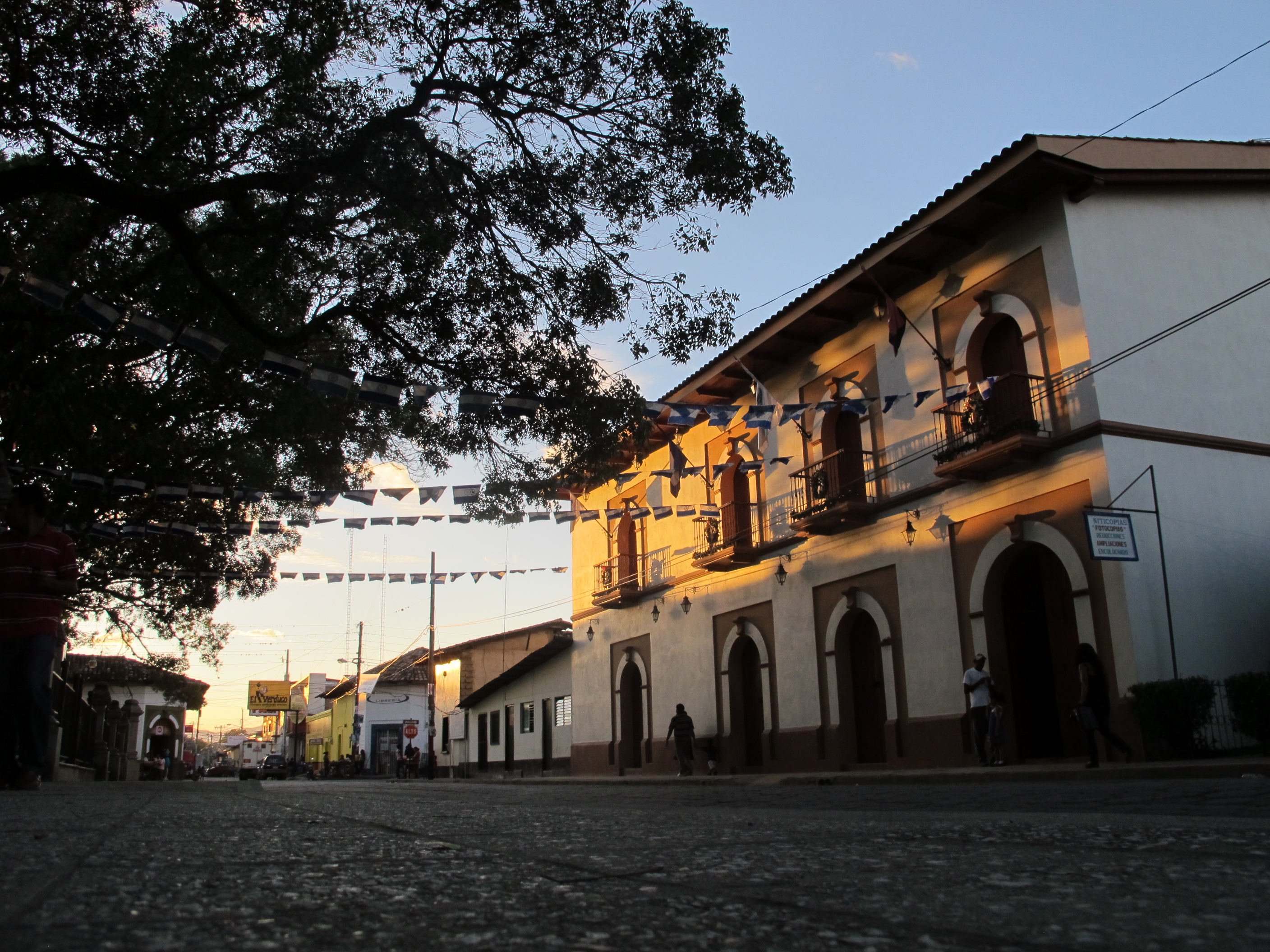

There are 29 neighbourhoods: José Santos Rodríguez, Sandino, Hermanos Zamora, Teodoro López, Monseñor Madrigal, José Santos Duarte, Danilo Ponce, Yelba María Antúnez, Anexo Yelba María Antunez, Noel Weelock, Enrique Lacayo Farfán, Anexo Laura Sofía, Roberto Gómez Montalvan, Laura Sofía Olivas Paz, Nicarao, Leonardo Matute, 26 de septiembre, Santa Ana, Carlos Manuel Jarquin, Ramón Augusto López, Nora Astorga, Cristo del Rosario, Nuevo Amanecer, María Auxiliadora, Dinamarca, Pueblos unidos (where the Colonia del Maestro y 8 de mayo zones have been built).

10 Municipal zones containing 22 Administrative areas

Zone 1
- José Santos Duarte
- Yelba María Antunez
Zone 2
- Nicarao,
- Santa Ana Anexo
- Laura Sofía Olivas
- Nora Astorga|
Zone 3
- Danilo Ponce
- Laura Sofía Olivas
Zone 4
- José S. Rodríguez
Zone 5
- Augusto C. Sandino
Zone 6
- Teodoro López
- Nuevo Amanecer
Zone 7
- Leonardo Matute,
- Ramón A. López
- Carlos Jarquín
- Lacayo Farfan
Zone 8
- Monseñor Madrigal
Zone 9
- Hermanos Zamora
Zone 10
- Noel Wheelock,
- Cristo de Rosario
- 26 de Septiembre
- Roberto Gómez

== Sport ==
Ocotal has a local soccer team known as Deportivo Ocotal.

== International relations ==
=== Twin towns – Sister cities ===
Ocotal is twinned with:

(England) Swindon, United Kingdom; (United States) Hartford, Connecticut	Wiesbaden, Germany

== Gallery ==
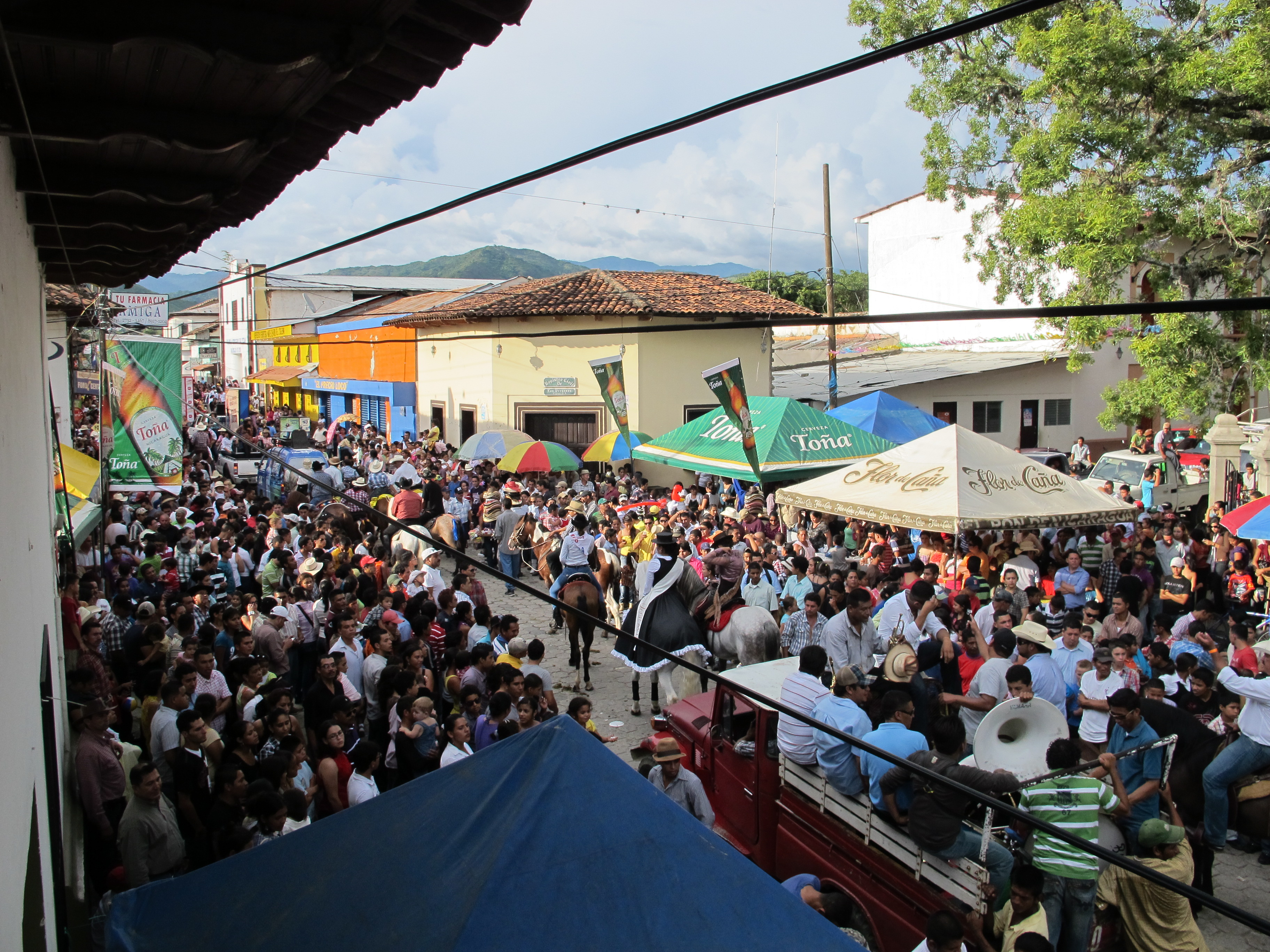

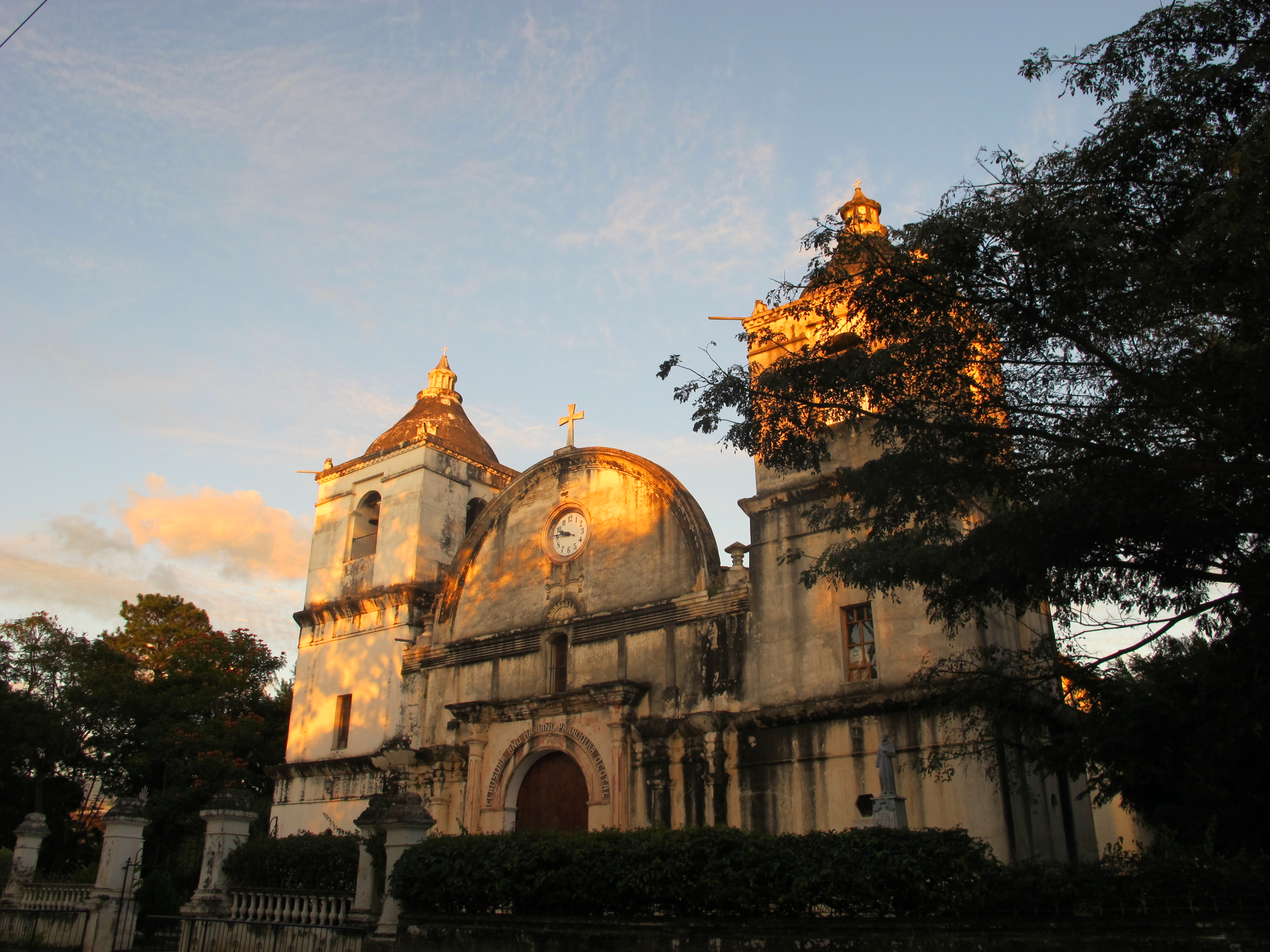

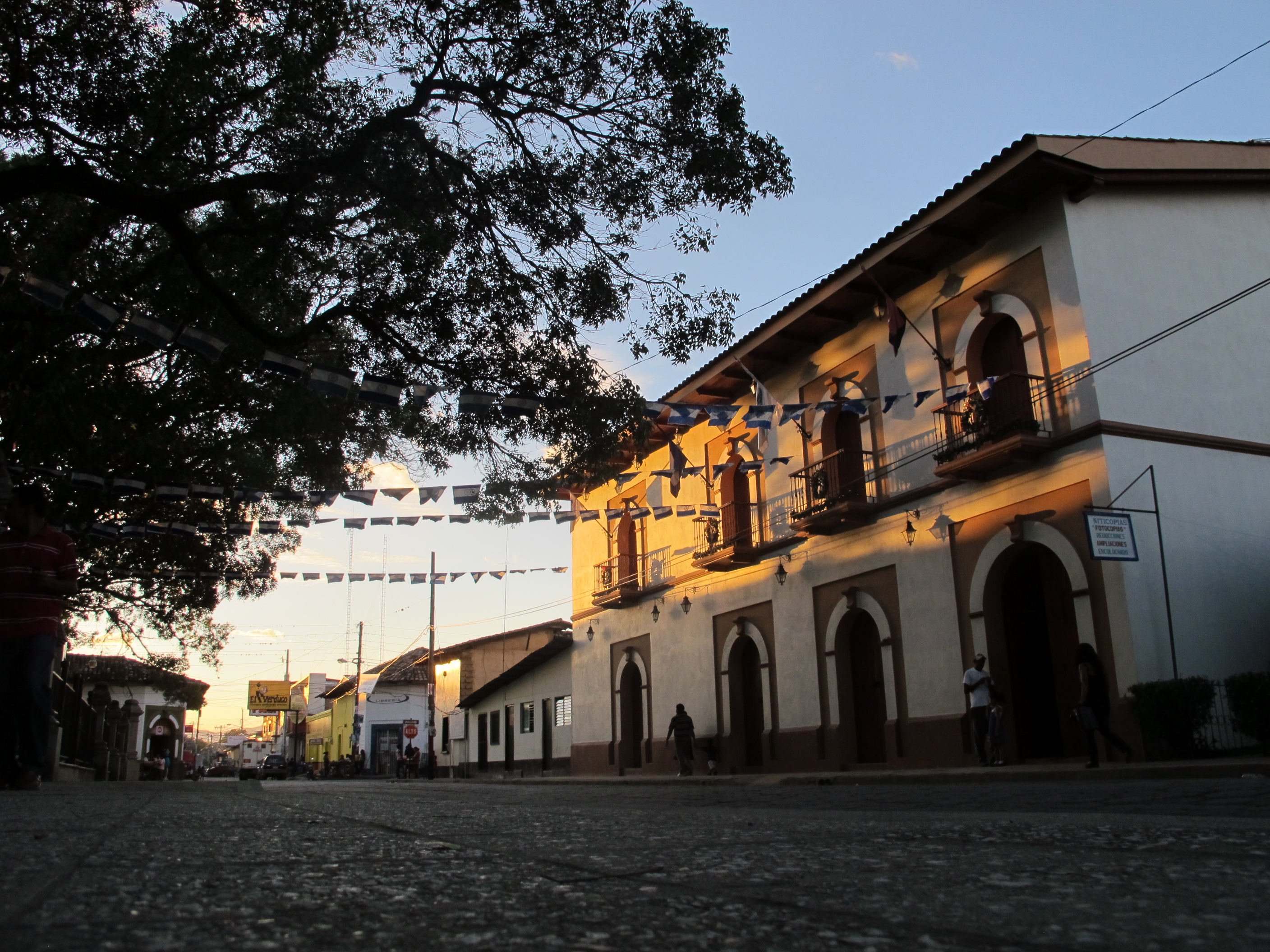

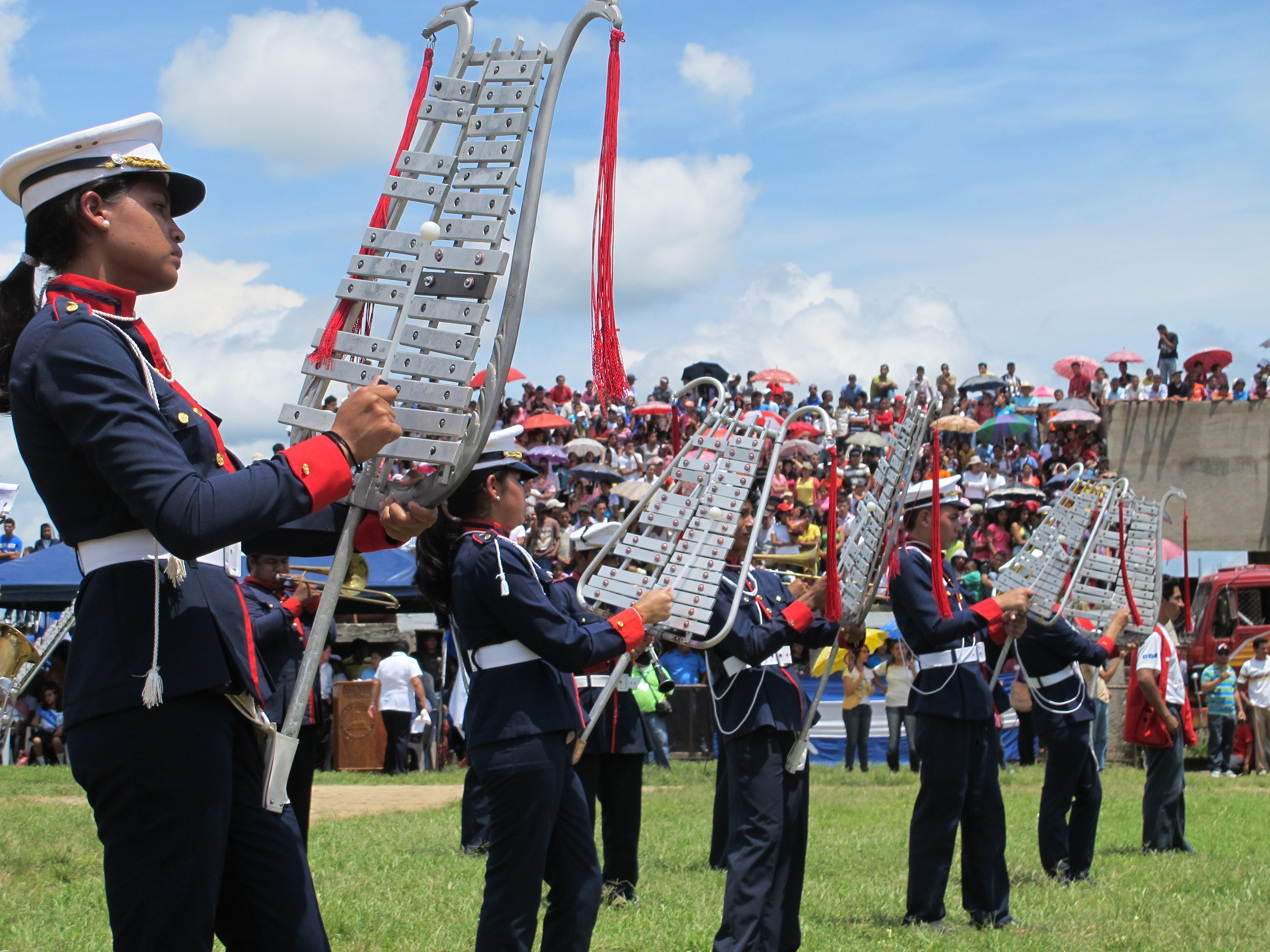

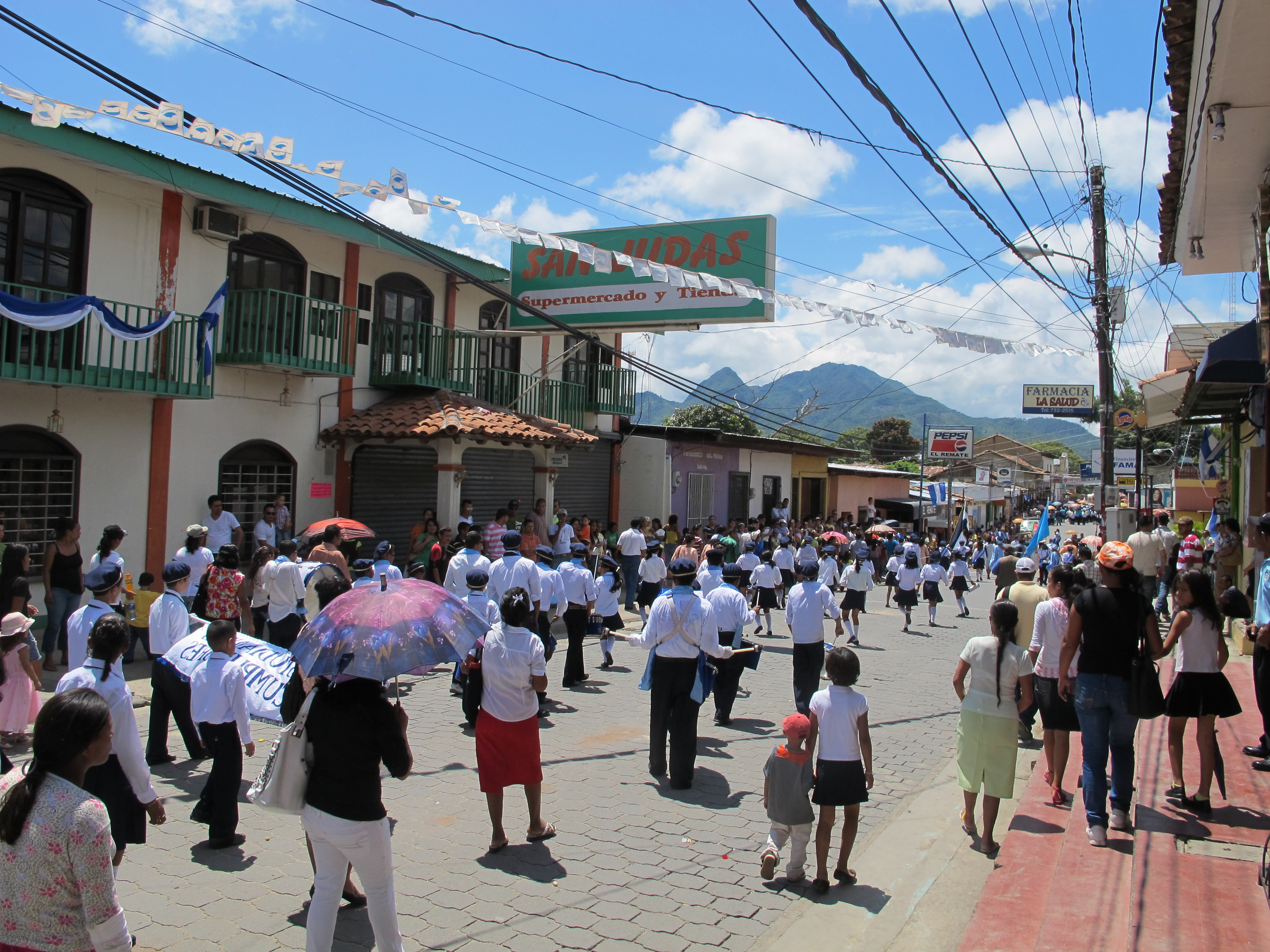

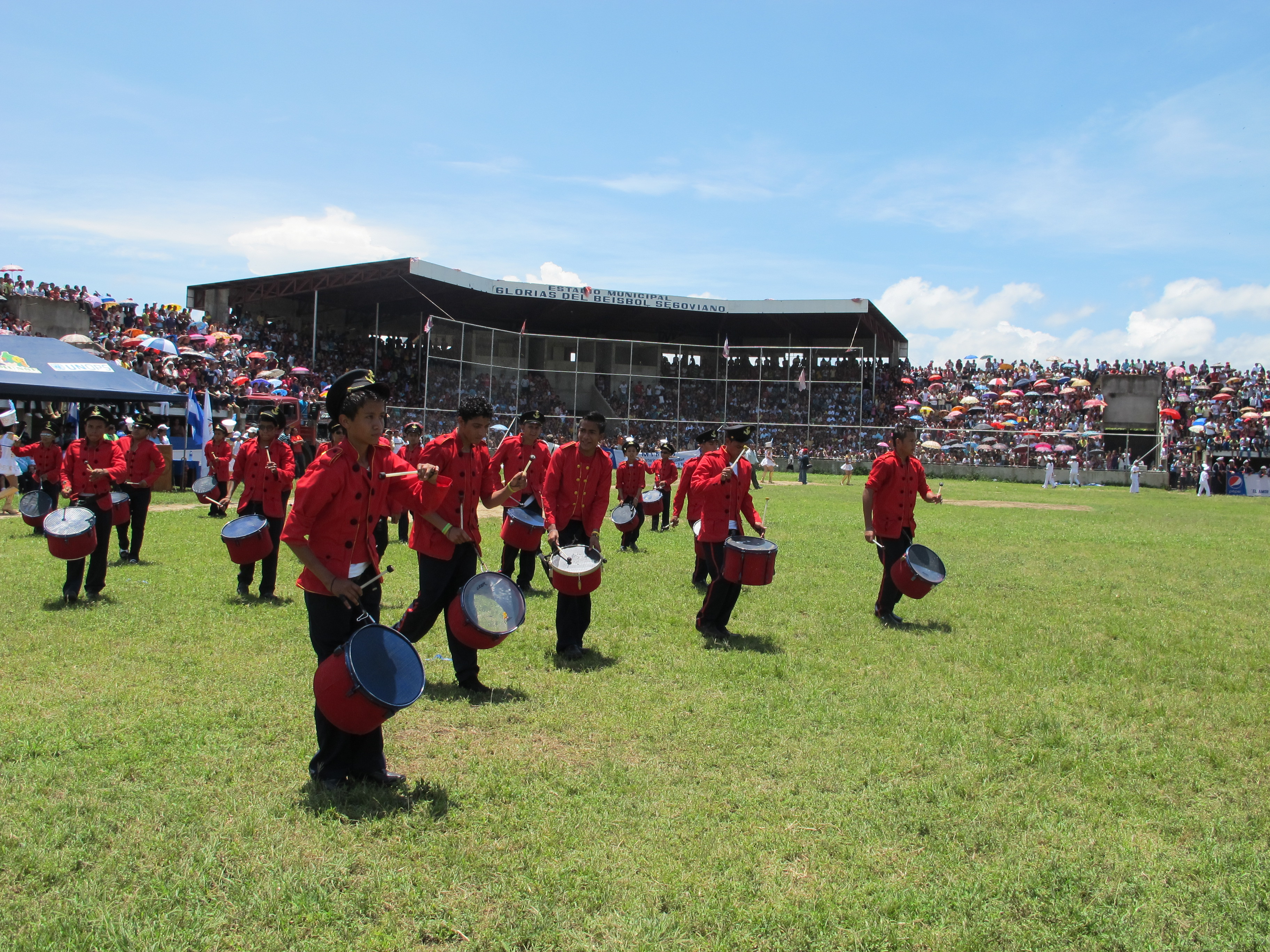

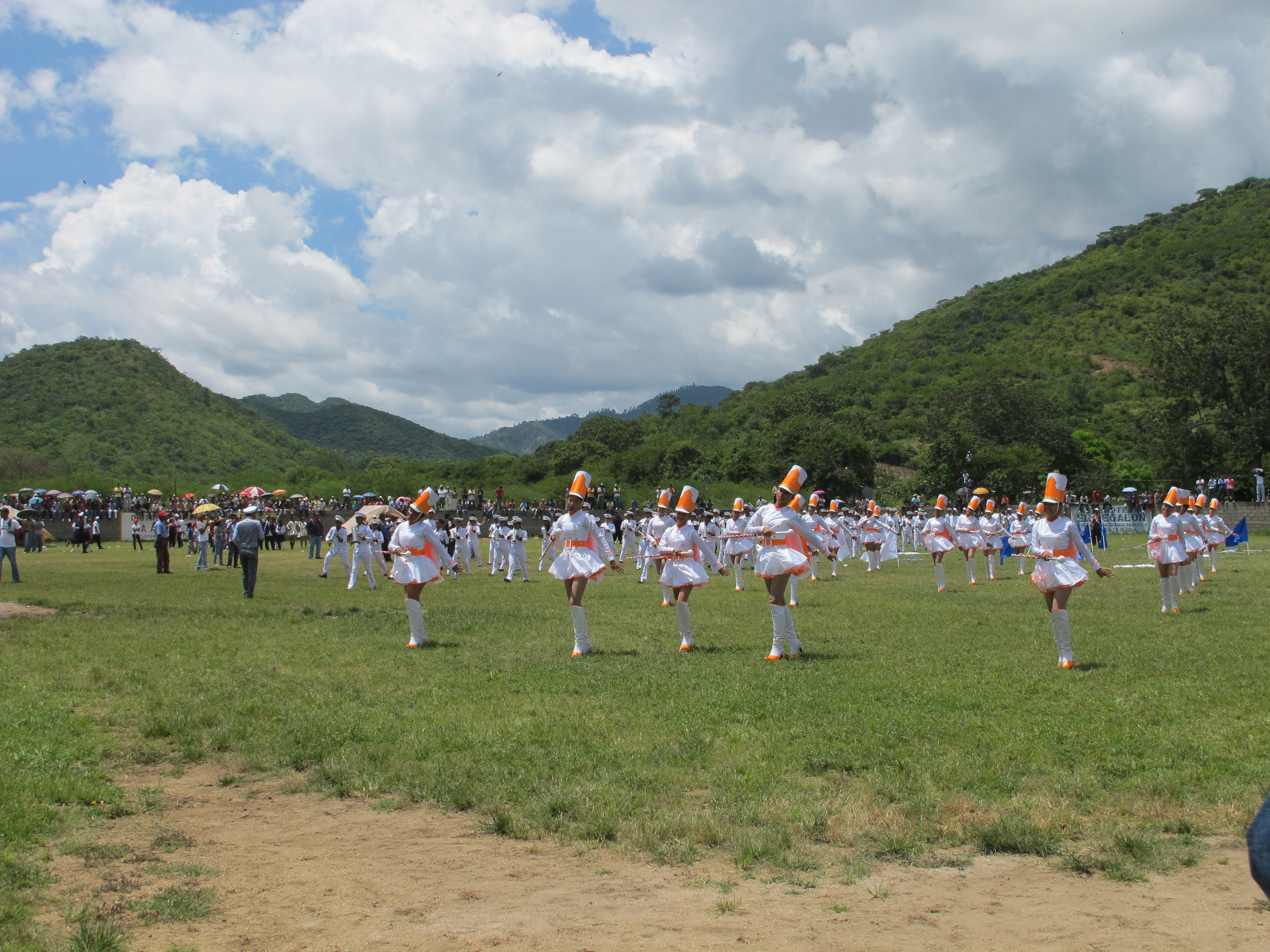

== Map ==
A map of Ocotal is being created by the OpenStreetMap project here
