= Wiwilí, Jinotega =

Wiwilí
- Municipality
- Location in Nicaragua
- Coordinates: 13°37′N 85°49′W
- Country: Nicaragua
- Department: Jinotega

Area
  - Municipality: 920 sq mi (2,370 km^{2})

Population (2022 estimate)
  - Municipality: 77,893
  - Density: 85.1/sq mi (32.9/km^{2})
  - Urban: 15,075
- Climate: Aw

Wiwilí (Spanish pronunciation: [wiwiˈli]) is a town and a municipality in the Jinotega department of Nicaragua.
