= Miss Nicaragua =

National beauty pageant in Nicaragua

- Type: Beauty pageant
- represented: Nicaragua
- First edition: 1955
- Last edition: 2023
- Language: Spanish
- Successor: Miss Universe Nicaragua

Miss Nicaragua was a Nicaraguan beauty pageant. It was held from 1955 until 2023, when the organization cancelled it for political reasons.

Since 2024, Miss Universe Nicaragua selects the Nicaraguan's official representative to Miss Universe.

== Titleholders ==
Year	Miss Nicaragua	Department
1955	Rosa Argentina Lacayo	Managua
1963	Leda Sánchez Ortega	Carazo
1968	Margine Davidson Morales	Matagalpa
1969	Soraya Herrera Chávez	Managua
1970	Graciela Salazar Lanzas	León Department
1971	Xiomara Paguaga Rodríguez	Managua
1973	Ana Cecilia Saravia Lanzas	León Department
1974	Francis Duarte de León Tapia	León Department
1975	Alda Maritza Sánchez	Masaya
1976	Ivania Navarro Genie	Matagalpa
1977	Beatriz Obregón Lacayo	Rivas
1978	Claudia Herrera Cortez	Masaya
1979	Patricia Pineda Chamorro	Rivas
1991	Ana Sofía Pereira	Managua
1992	Ida Patricia Delaney	Managua
1993	Luisa Amalia Urcuyo Lacayo	Rivas
1995	Linda Asalia Clerk Castillo	Managua
1996	Luz María Sánchez Herdocia	Managua
1998	Claudia Alaniz	Managua
1999	Liliana Pilarte Centeno	Río San Juan
2001	Ligia Cristina Argüello Roa	Managua
2002	Marianela Lacayo	Managua
2003	Claudia Salmerón Avilés	Managua
2004	Marifely Argüello César	Managua
2005	Daniela Clerk Castillo	Managua
2006	Cristiana Frixione	Managua
2007	Xiomara Blandino	Managua
2008	Thelma Rodríguez	Chinandega
2009	Indiana Sánchez	Managua
2010	Scharllette Allen	South Caribbean Coast Autonomous Region
2011	Adriana Dorn	Managua
2012	Farah Eslaquit	Masaya
2013	Nastassja Bolívar	Carazo
2014	Marline Barberena	Chinandega
2015	Daniela Torres	Managua
2016	Marina Jacoby	Matagalpa
2017	Berenice Quezada	South Caribbean Coast Autonomous Region
2018	Adriana Paniagua	Chinandega
2019	Inés López	Managua
2020	Ana Marcelo	Estelí
2021	Allison Wassmer	Managua
2022	Norma Huembes	Carazo
2023	Sheynnis Palacios	Carazo

== Big Four pageants representatives ==
The following women have represented Nicaragua in the Big Four international beauty pageants.

=== Miss Universe ===
- : Declared as winner
- : Ended as runner-up or top 5/6 qualification
- : Ended as one of the finalists or semifinalists
- : Ended as special awards winner

The winner of Miss Nicaragua represented her country at the Miss Universe. On occasion, when the winner does not qualify (due to age) for either contest, a runner-up is sent.

Year	Department	Miss Nicaragua	Placement at Miss Universe	Special awards
2023	Carazo	Sheynnis Palacios	Miss Universe 2023	
2022	Carazo	Norma Huembes	Unplaced	
2021	Managua	Allison Wassmer	Unplaced	
2020	Estelí	Ana Marcelo	Top 21	
2019	Managua	Inés López	Unplaced	
2018	Chinandega	Adriana Paniagua	Unplaced	
2017	RACCS	Berenice Quezada	Unplaced	
2016	Matagalpa	Marina Jacoby	Unplaced	
2015	Managua	Daniela Torres	Unplaced	Best National Costume (4th Place)
2014	Chinandega	Marline Barberena	Unplaced	
2013	Carazo	Nastassja Bolívar	Top 16	Best National Costume
2012	Masaya	Farah Eslaquit	Unplaced	Best National Costume (6th Place)
2011	Managua	Adriana Dorn	Unplaced	
2010	RACCS	Scharllette Allen	Unplaced	
2009	Managua	Indiana Sánchez	Unplaced	Best in National Costume (2nd Place)
2008	Chinandega	Thelma Rodríguez	Unplaced	
2007	Managua	Xiomara Blandino	Top 10	
2006	Managua	Cristiana Frixione	Unplaced	
2005	Managua	Daniela Clerk	Unplaced	
2004	Managua	Marifely Argüello	Unplaced	
2003	Managua	Claudia Salmerón	Unplaced	
2002	Managua	Marianela Lacayo	Unplaced	
2001	Managua	Ligia Argüello	Unplaced	
2000	No competition held			
1999	Río San Juan	Liliana Pilarte	Unplaced	
1998	Managua	Claudia Alaniz	Unplaced	
1997	No competition held			
1996	Managua	Luz María Sánchez Herdocia	Did not compete	
1995	Managua	Linda Clerk	Unplaced	
1994	No competition held			
1993	Rivas	Luisa Urcuyo	Unplaced	
1992	Managua	Ida Delaney	Unplaced	
1991	Managua	Ana Sofía Pereira	Unplaced	
No competition held between 1980–1990
1979	Rivas	Patricia Pineda	Withdrew from the competition	
1978	Masaya	Claudia Herrera	Unplaced	
1977	Rivas	Beatriz Obregón	Top 12	
1976	Matagalpa	Ivania Navarro	Unplaced	
1975	Masaya	Alda Maritza Sánchez	Unplaced	
1974	León	Francis Duarte	Unplaced	
1973	León	Ana Saravia	Unplaced	
1972	No competition held			
1971	Managua	Xiomara Paguaga	Unplaced	
1970	León	Graciela Salazar	Unplaced	
1969	Managua	Soraya Herrera	Unplaced	
1968	Matagalpa	Margine Davidson	Unplaced	
No competition held between 1964–1967
1963	Carazo	Leda Sánchez	Unplaced	
No competition held between 1956–1962
1955	Managua	Rosa Argentina Lacayo †	Unplaced	Best Dressed Girl

== Gallery of Winners ==
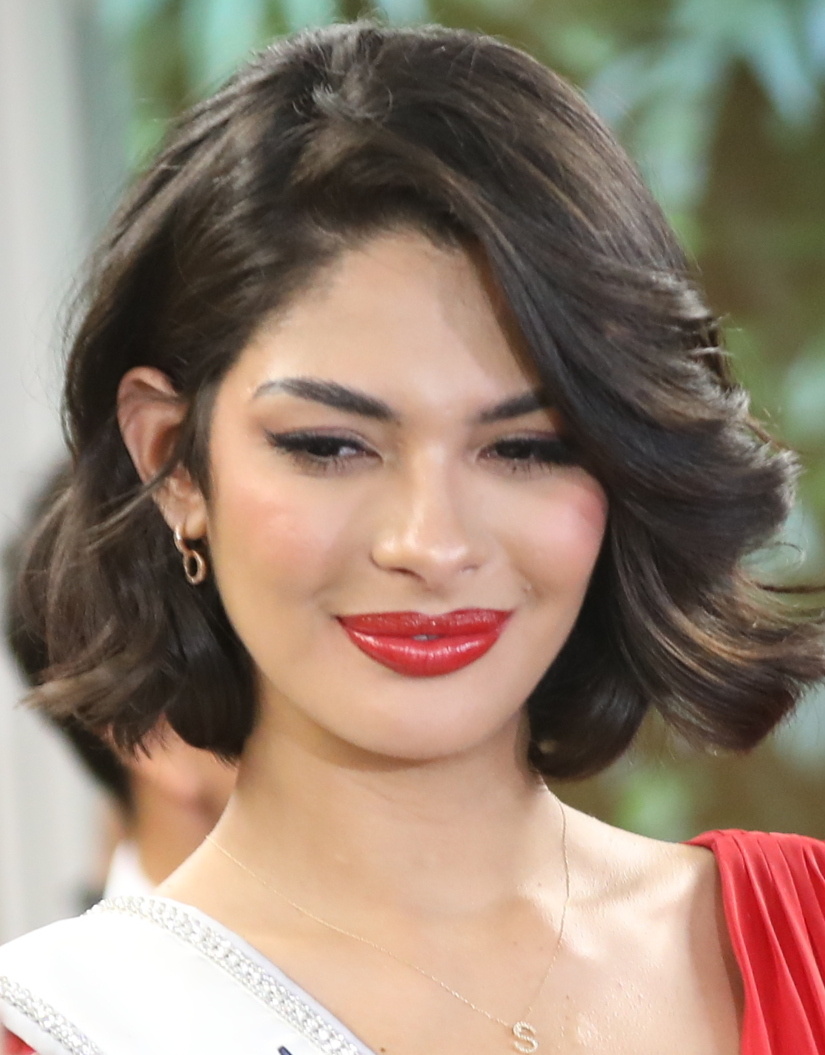
2023, Sheynnis Palacios and Miss Universe 2023

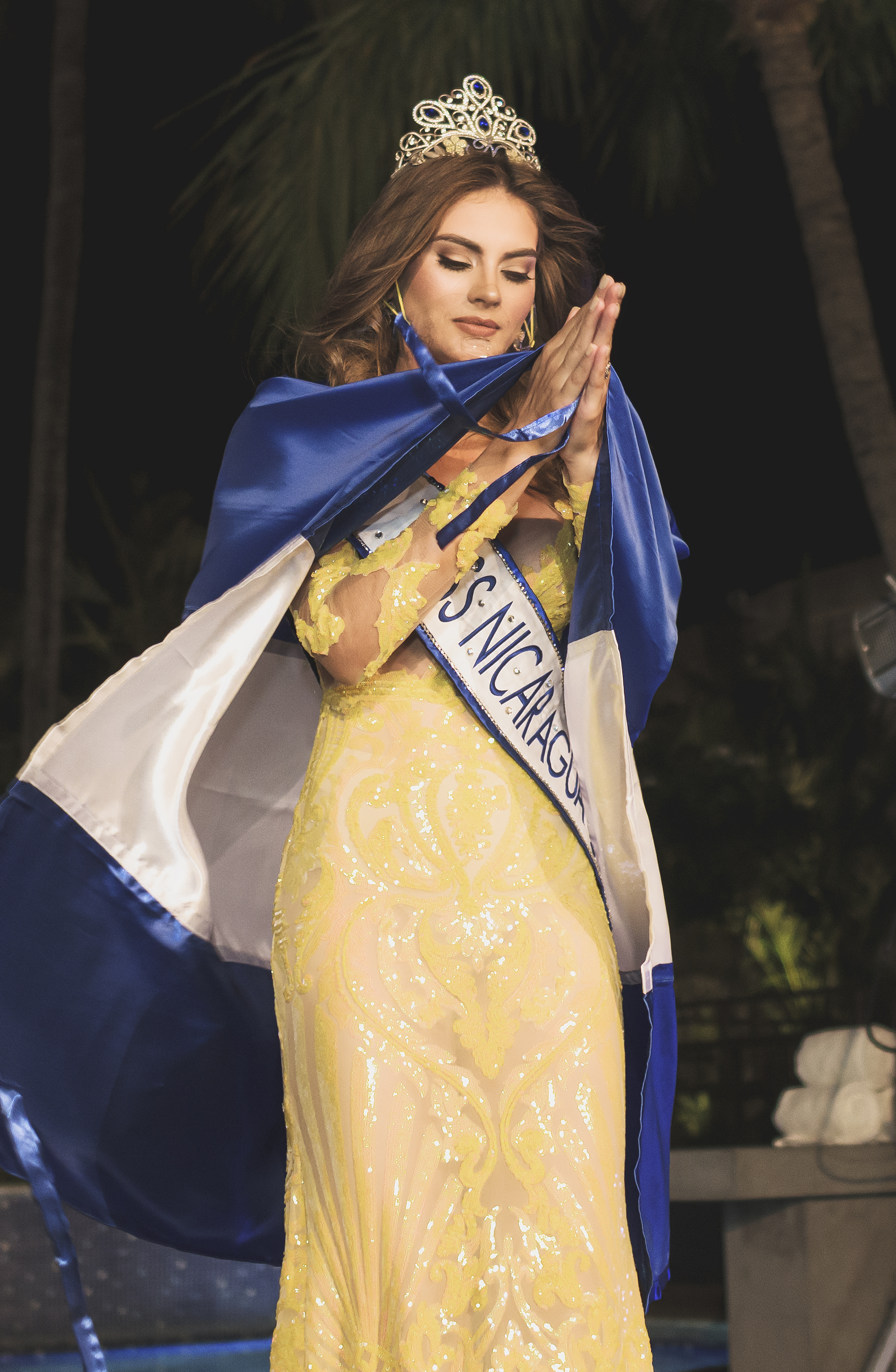
2020, Ana Marcelo

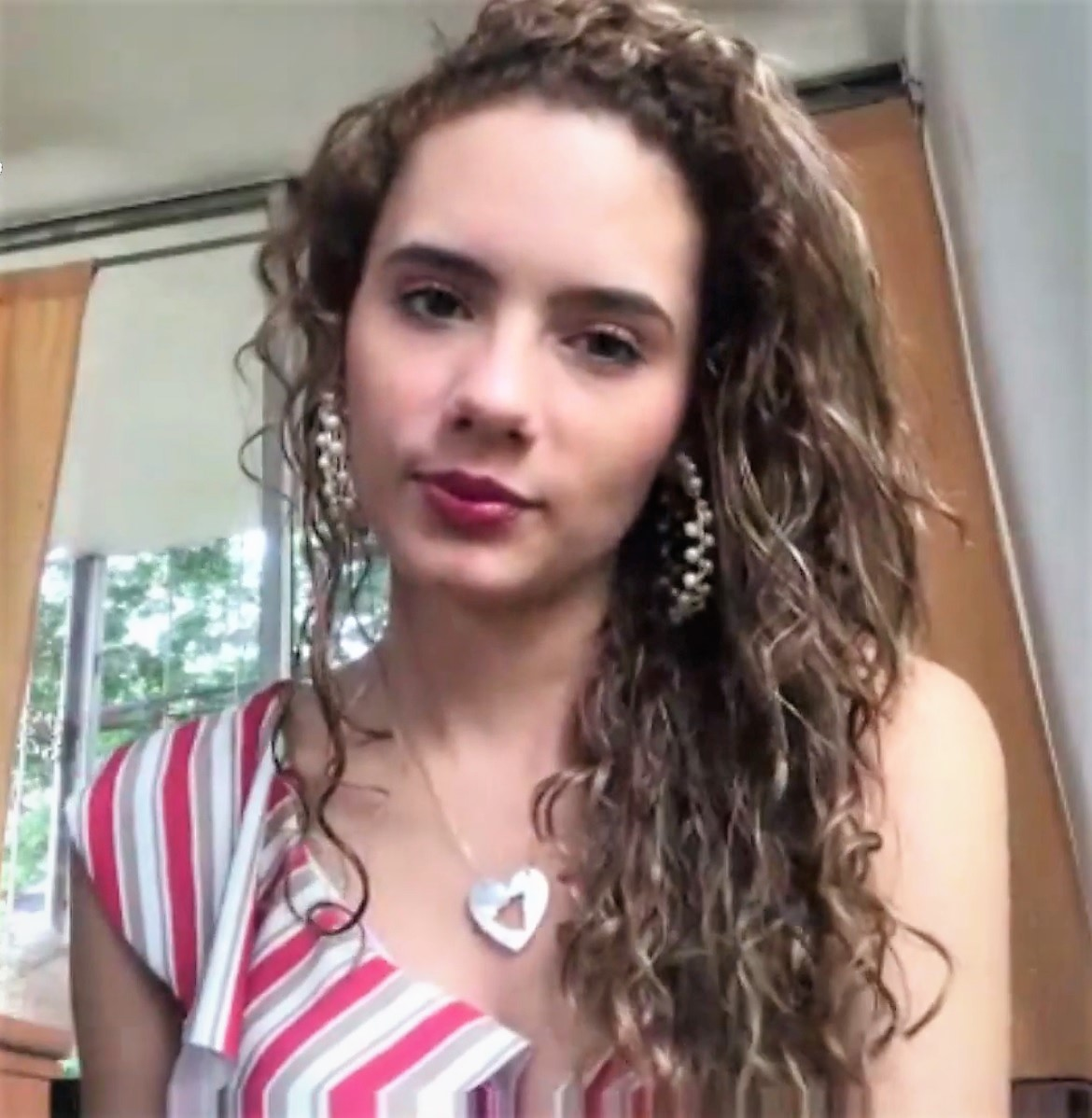
2019, Inés López

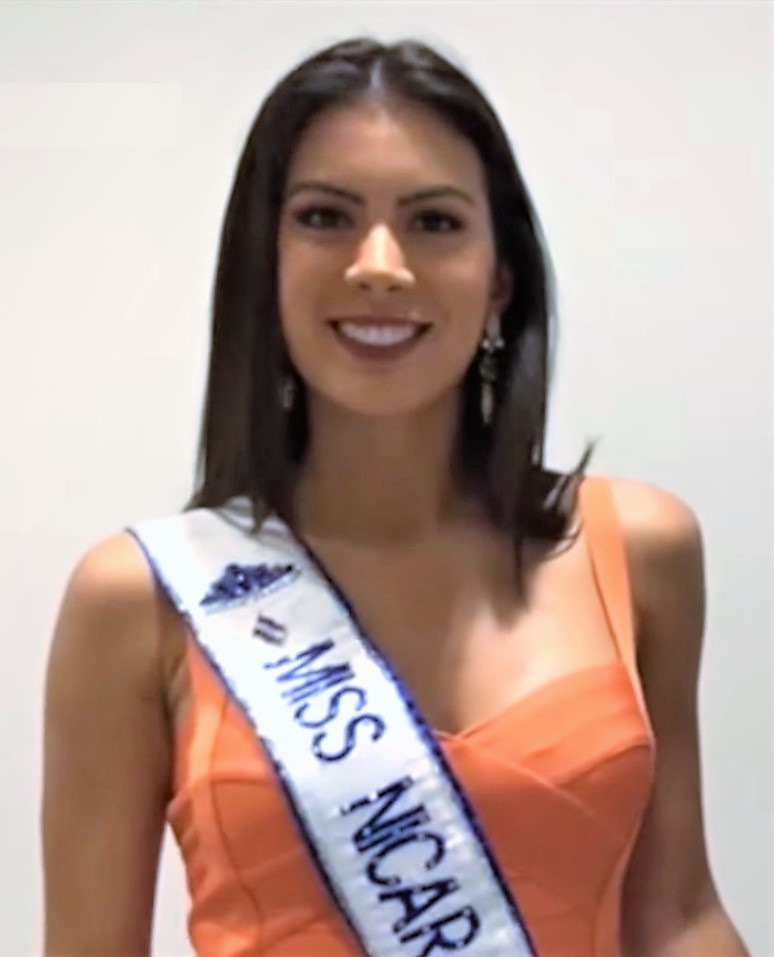
2018, Adriana Paniagua

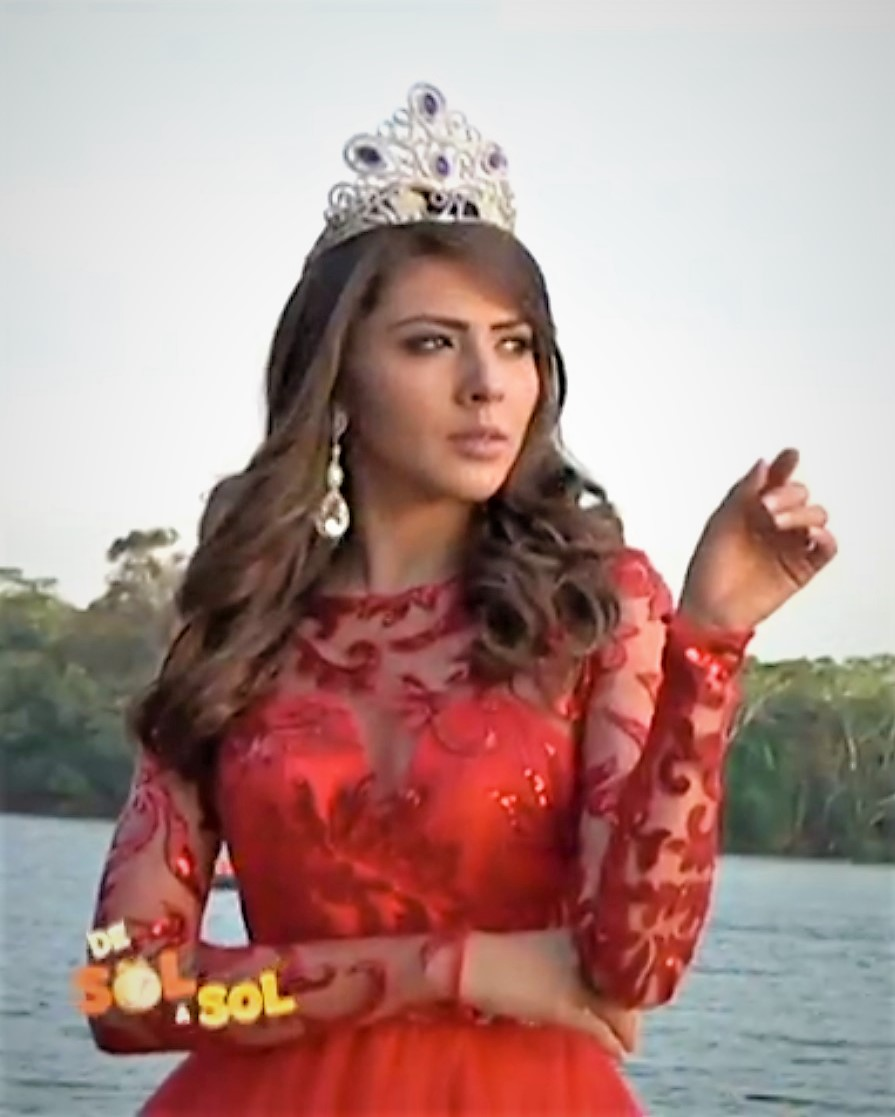
2017, Berenice Quezada

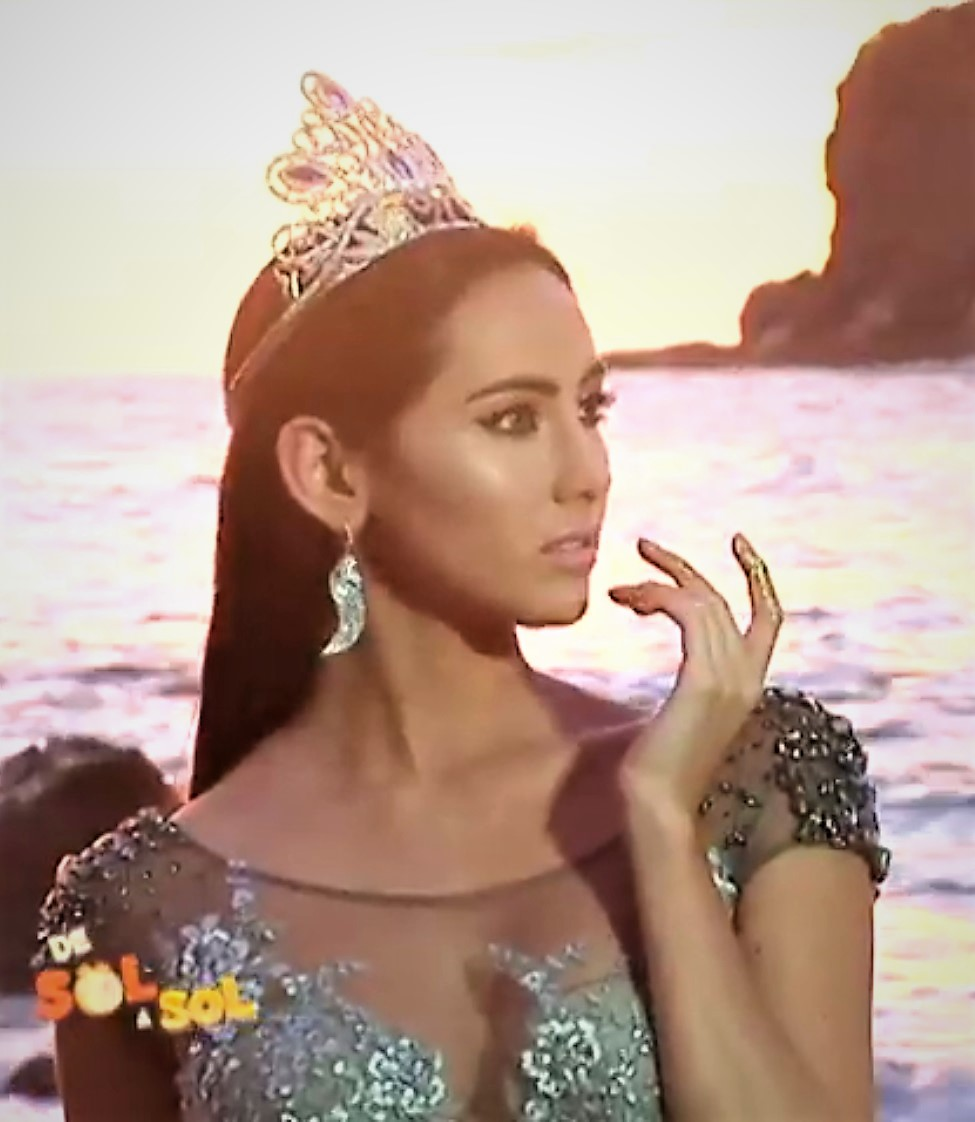
2016, Marina Jacoby

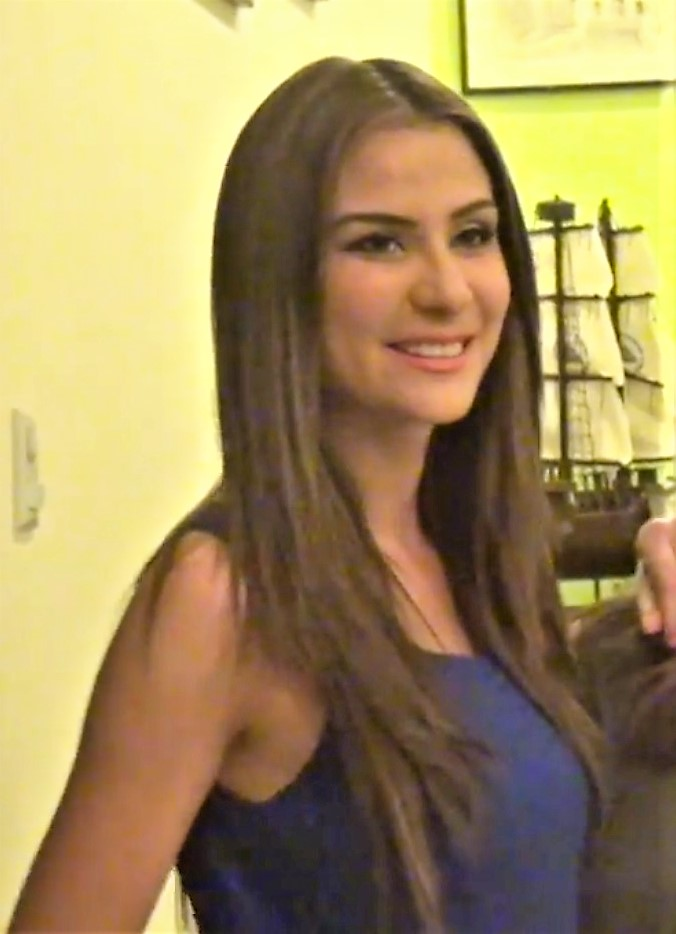
2015, Daniela Torres

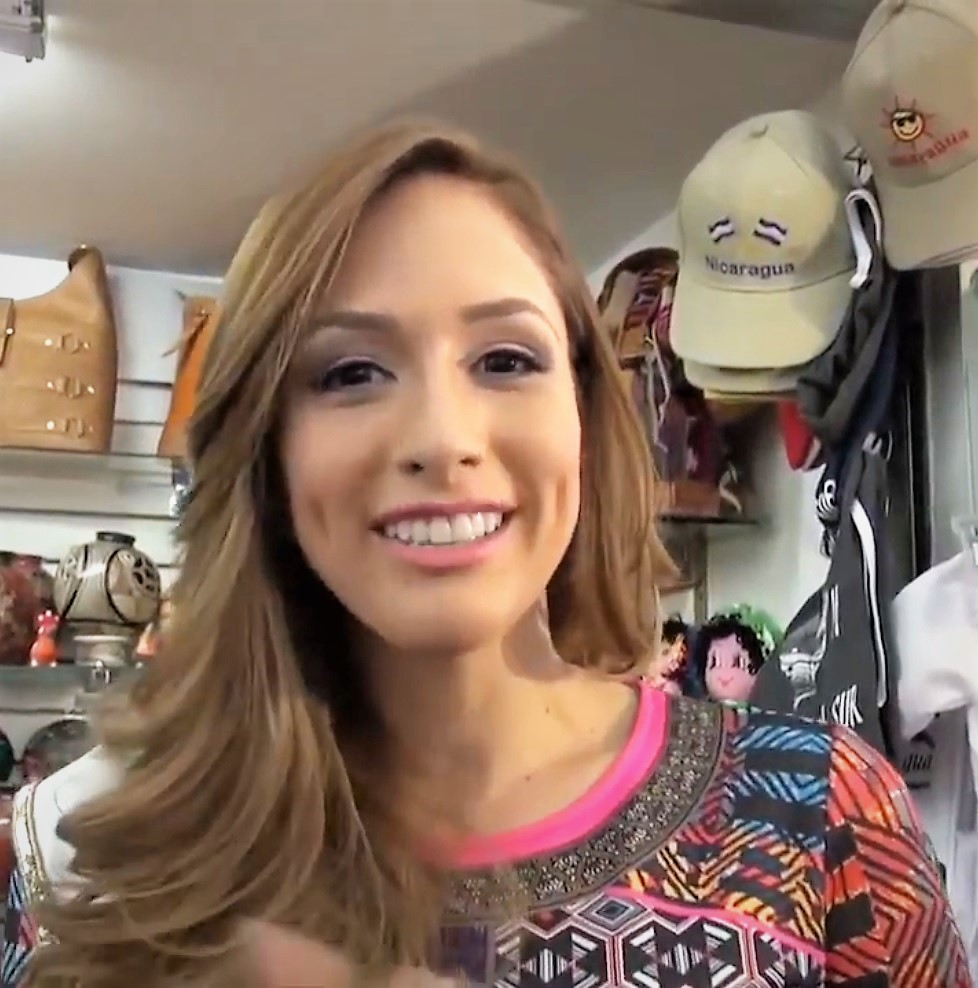
2014, Marline Barberena

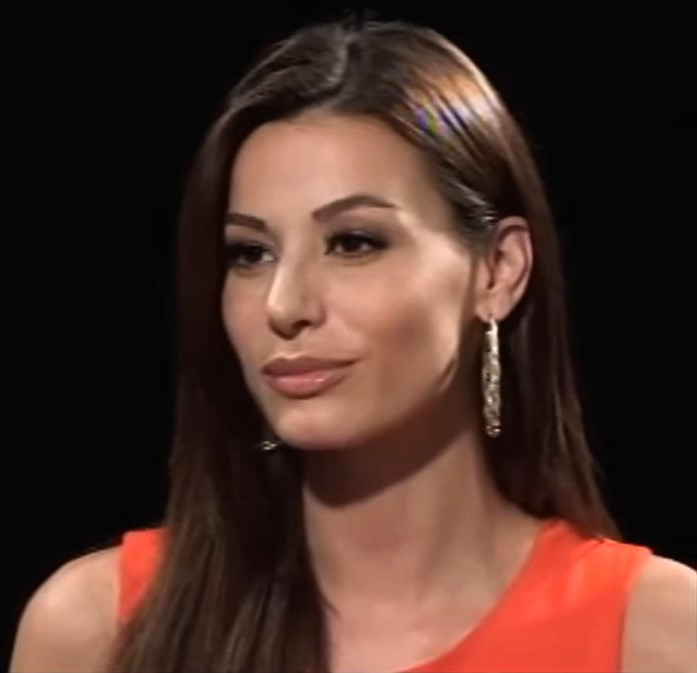
2013, Nastassja Bolívar

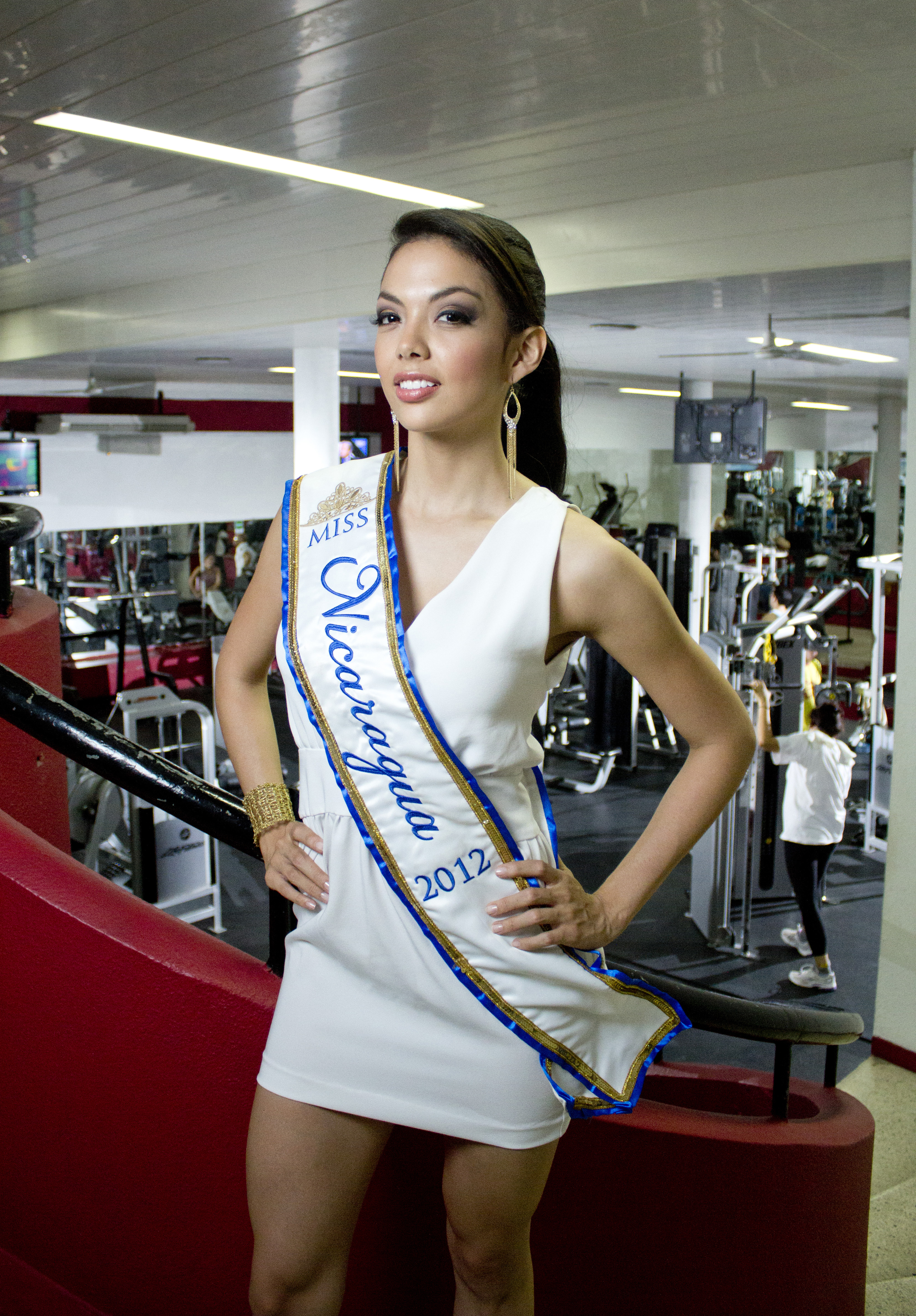
2012, Farah Eslaquit

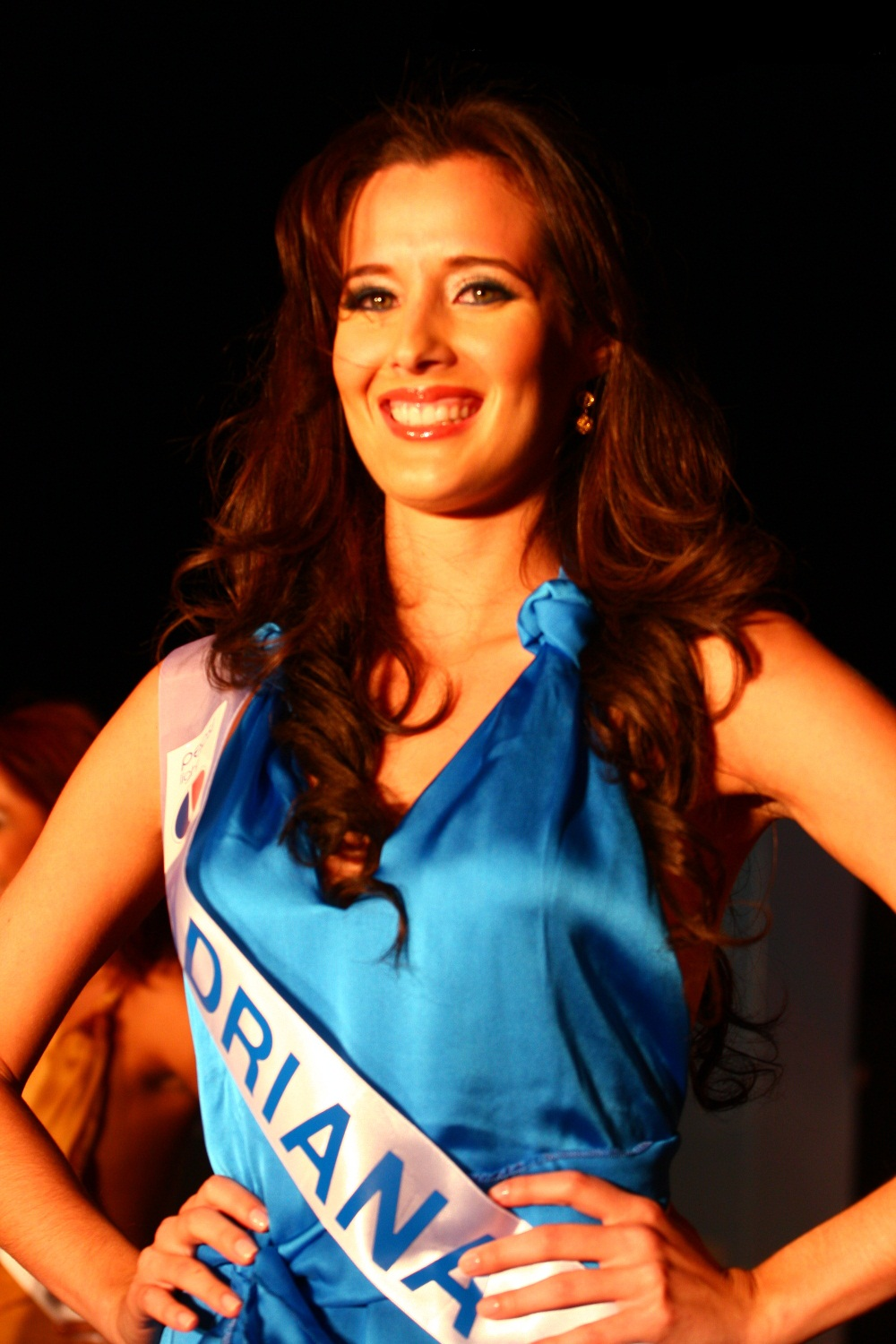
2011, Adriana Dorn

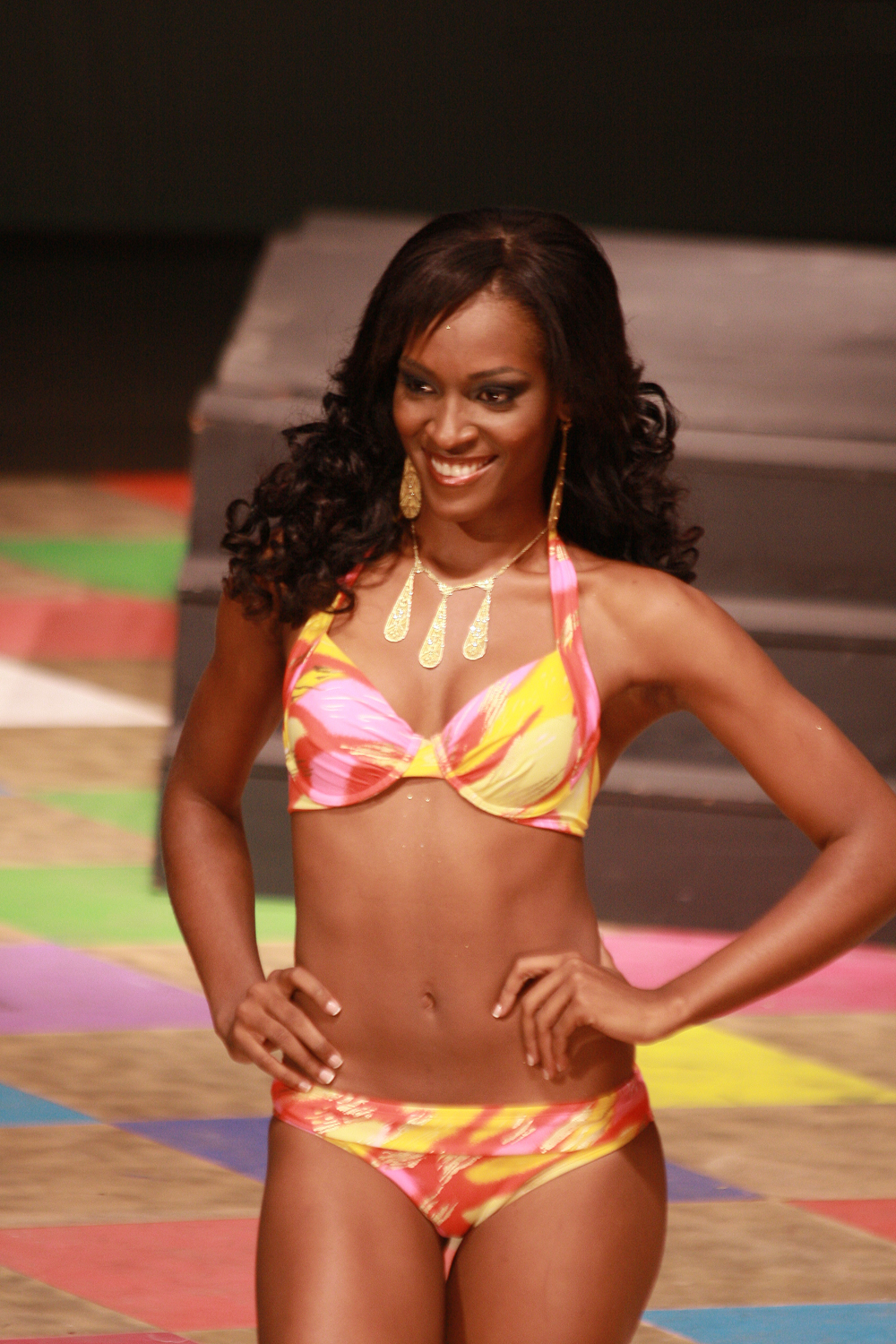
2010, Scharllette Allen

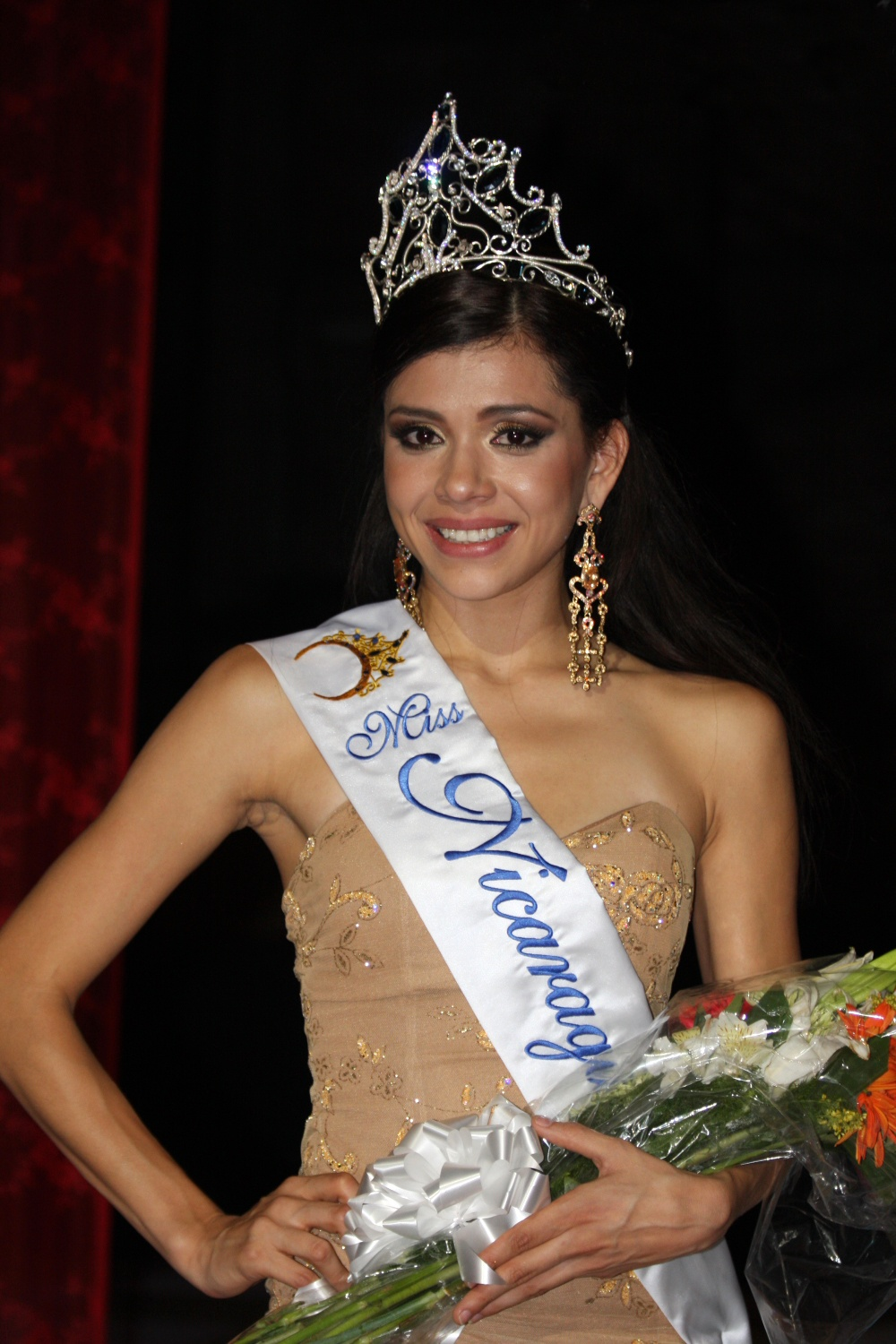
2009, Indiana Sánchez

2008, Thelma Rodríguez

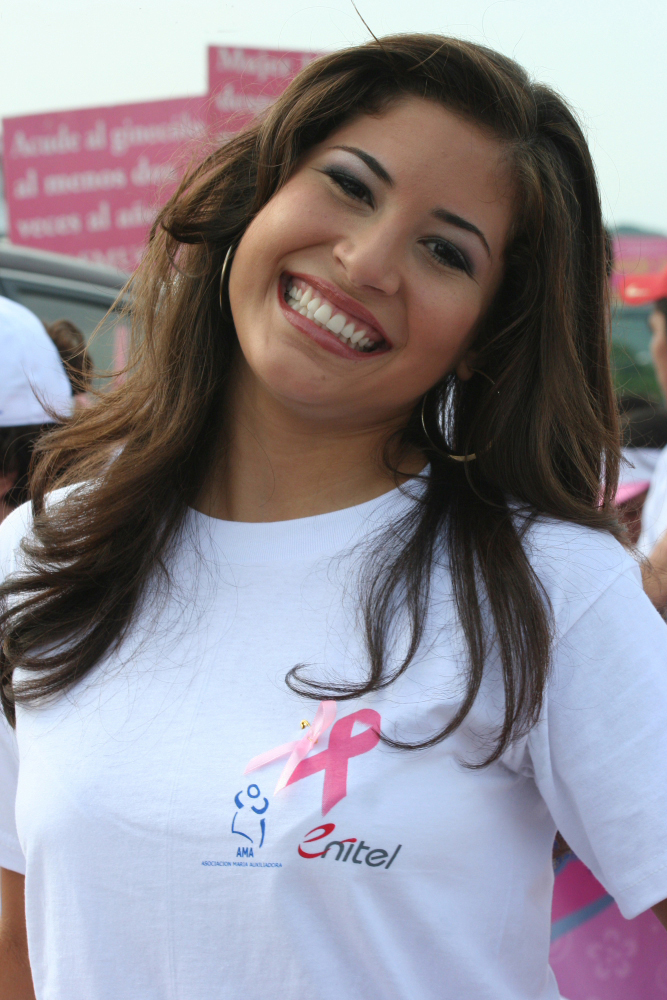
2007, Xiomara Blandino

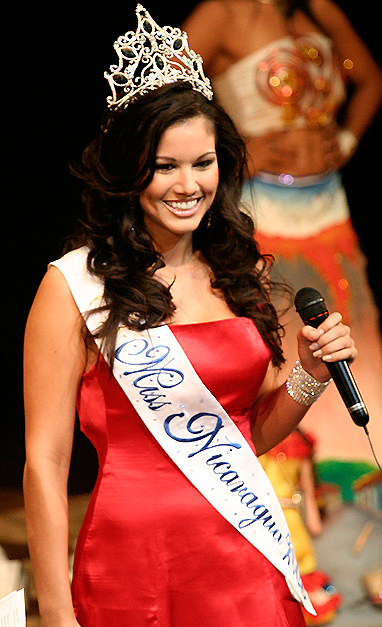
2006, Cristiana Frixione

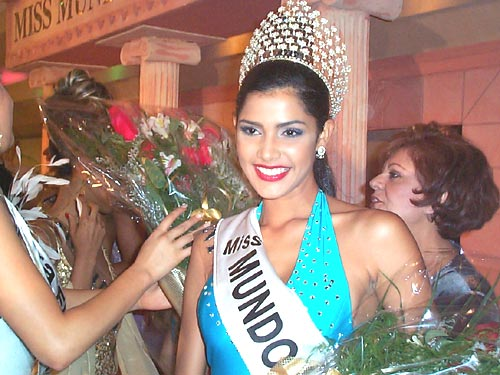
2002, Marianela Lacayo

=== Regional rankings ===
Department	Titles	Years
Managua	20	1955; 1969; 1971; 1991; 1992; 1995; 1996; 1998; 2001; 2002; 2003; 2004; 2005; 2006; 2007; 2009; 2011; 2015; 2019; 2021
Carazo	4	1963; 2013; 2022; 2023
Chinandega	3	2008; 2014; 2018
León	3	1970; 1973; 1974
Masaya	3	1975; 1978; 2012
Matagalpa	3	1968; 1976; 2016
Rivas	3	1977; 1979; 1993
South Caribbean Coast Autonomous Region	2	2010; 2017
Estelí	1	2020
Río San Juan	1	1999

=== Notes ===
==== Contestants ====
The runners-up and semi-finalists of the Miss Nicaragua pageant are sometimes sent to represent Nicaragua in other international beauty pageants. Winners include Sharon Amador, the first finalist in Miss Nicaragua 2006. Amador won Miss Ambar Mundial in 2006. In 2010, the franchise for Miss Earth Nicaragua was awarded to Nuestra Belleza Nicaragua. In 2023, Katherine Burgos Reyes, the first runner-up of Miss Nicaragua 2022 was appointed to compete at Miss Supranational 2023.

==== Removed ====
Miss Nicaragua 2013, Nastassja Bolívar was removed after competing at the Miss Universe 2013 in Moscow, Russia.

== See also ==
- Miss Universe Nicaragua
- Miss Mundo Nicaragua
