= Miss Nicaragua 2015 =

- Date: March 7, 2015
- Presenters: Jorge Hurtado; Valeria Sanchez
- Venue: Teatro Nacional Rubén Darío, Managua, Nicaragua
- Broadcaster: VosTV
- Entrants: 12
- Winner: Daniela Torres Bonilla; Managua

Miss Nicaragua 2015 was the thirty-fifth Miss Nicaragua pageant, held at the Teatro Nacional Rubén Darío in Managua, Nicaragua, on March 7, 2015.

Daniela Torres Bonilla of Managua was crowned Miss Nicaragua 2015 at the end of the event. She represented Nicaragua at Miss Universe 2015 in Las Vegas, Nevada later that year. The rest of the finalists would enter different pageants.

== Results ==
=== Placements ===
Placement	Contestant
Miss Nicaragua 2015	Managua – Daniela Torres Bonilla
Miss Nicaragua International 2015	Tipitapa – Yaoska Ruiz
1st Runner-Up	Granada – Ruth Angélica Martínez
Top 6	Ciudad Sandino – Gabriela Calero; Ciudad Darío – Liseth Balmaceda; Estelí – Yuliset Sotelo

== Special awards ==
- Miss Gillette Venus - Granada - Ruth Angélica Martínez
- Best Hair - Managua - Daniela Torres
- Most Beautiful Face - Tipitapa - Yaoska Ruiz
- Miss Photogenic - Managua - Daniela Torres
- Miss Congeniality - Matagalpa - Karen Salgado
- Best Smile - Managua - Daniela Torres
- Miss Fitness - Tipitapa - Yaoska Ruiz

== Official Contestants ==
State	Contestant
Bluefields	Catherine Koldergaard
Carazo	Diana Lopez
Chinandega	Amy Romero
Chontales	Karen Villalobos McField
Ciudad Dario	Liseth Balmaceda
Ciudad Sandino	Gabriela Calero
Estelí	Yuliset Sotelo
Granada	Ruth Angelica Martinez
Managua	Daniela Torres Bonilla
Matagalpa	Karen Salgado
Tipitapa	Yaoska Ruiz
Villanueva	Gabriela Sanchez

== Trivia ==
- Celeste Castillo Miss International Nicaragua 2013 roaming around backstage and spoke to misses for their take on whether couture has any influence on their street style or double check their answers, to report on the action for the live broadcasting Show.
- Viewers were able to interact with the pageant via Movistar. Fans were able to vote for their favorite contestant through the Miss Nicaragua website, from February 7 to March 7. Miss Tipitapa, Yaoska Ruiz, won the most MSM votes among the contestants, winning her a spot in the Top 6.

== Judges ==
- Mignone Vega - Fashion Designer
- Marianela Lacayo - Miss Nicaragua 2002
- Claudia Salmeron - Miss Nicaragua 2003
- Rafael Sanchez - Executive Director of AFN (American Nicaraguan Foundation)
- Vannesa Osorio - Marketing Manager of Contempo Hotel
- Tatiana Pilarte Arcia - Independent Consultor
- Indiana Sánchez - Miss Nicaragua 2009

== Live Music ==
- Opening Show – Ballet Macehuatl - "El Garañon"
- Swimsuit Competition – Alias Rhythm - "Closer"
- Evening Gown Competition – Mafia Funk & Polux - "Dias De Amar", "Fantasma Camaleon" & "Yo No Se Mañana"

== Special Guests ==
- Grupo de Danzas S.e.v.E.n - "Uptown Funk"
