= Miss Nicaragua 2006 =

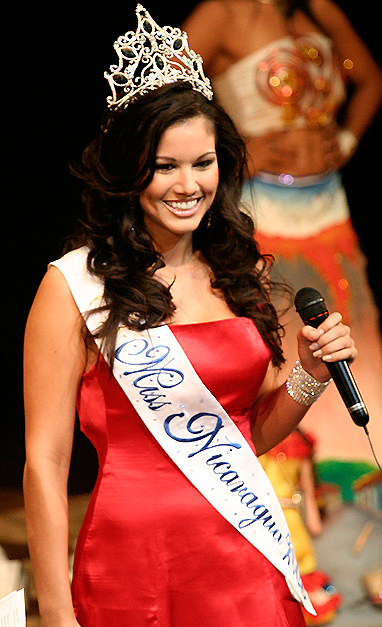
- Frixione at the Miss Nicaragua 2007 contest
- Date: March 4, 2006
- Presenters: Ivan Taylor
- Venue: Teatro Nacional Rubén Darío, Managua, Nicaragua
- Broadcaster: Televicentro
- Entrants: 16
- Winner: Cristiana Frixione; Managua

The Miss Nicaragua 2006 pageant, was held on March 4, 2006 in Managua, after several weeks of events. At the conclusion of the final night of competition, Cristiana Frixione from Managua won the title. She represented Nicaragua at Miss Universe 2006 held in Los Angeles later that year. The rest of the finalists would enter different pageants.

== Results ==
=== Placements ===
Placement	Contestant
Miss Nicaragua 2006	Managua – Cristiana Frixione
Miss Nicaragua Earth 2006	Matagalpa – Sharon Amador
1st Runner-Up	Ciudad Dario – Anahir Rocha
Top 7	Granada – Tanya Marenco; Nueva Segovia – Marjorie Tercero; Masaya – Mariana Navarrete; Bluefields – Dina Hodgson

== Special awards ==
- Miss Photogenic - Tipitapa - Rosalba Mejia
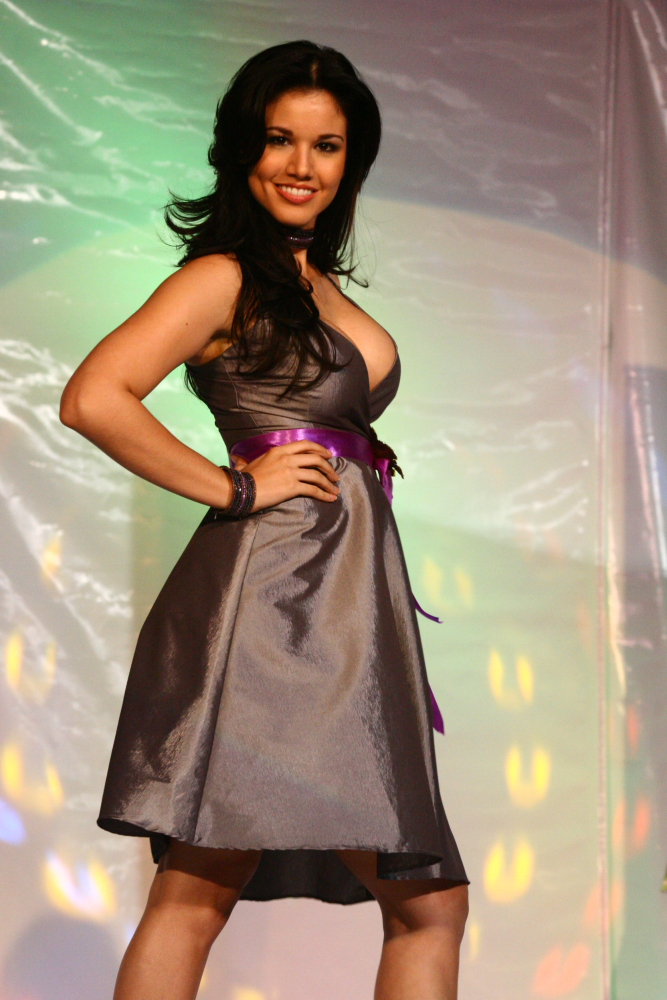
- Frixione in 2007 in Managua.
  Best Hair - Managua - Cristiana Frixione
- Best Smile - Jinotega - Silvia Flores
- Most Beautiful Face - Managua - Cristiana Frixione
- Miss Congeniality - Nueva Segovia - Marjorie Tercero
- Miss Fitness - Managua - Cristiana Frixione

== Contestants ==
Sixteen contestants competed for the two titles.

Department/City	Contestant
Achuapa	Nadia Flores
Bluefields	Dina Hodgson
Carazo	Arlen Lopez Calderón
Chinandega	Hazel Centeno
Ciudad Dario	Anahir Rocha
Estelí	Junieth Chavarria
Granada	Tanya Marenco
Jinotega	Silvia Flores
León	Iris Vega
Managua	Cristiana Frixione
Masaya	Mariana Navarrete
Matagalpa	Sharon Amador
Nueva Segovia	Marjorie Tercero
Río San Juan	Looryee Solorzano
Rivas	Sonia Mairena
Tipitapa	Rosalba Mejia
