= Miss Nicaragua 2005 =

- Date: March 5, 2005
- Presenters: Ivan Taylor & Marifely Argüello
- Venue: Teatro Nacional Rubén Darío, Managua, Nicaragua
- Broadcaster: Televicentro
- Entrants: 12
- Winner: Daniela Clerk; Managua

The Miss Nicaragua 2005 pageant was a Nicaraguan beauty pageant held on March 5, 2005 in Managua, after several weeks of events. At the conclusion of the final night of competition, Daniela Clerk -herself sister of Miss Nicaragua 1999, Linda Clerk- from Managua won the title.

== Results ==
=== Placements ===
Placement	Contestant
Miss Nicaragua 2005	Managua – Daniela Clerk
Miss World Nicaragua 2005	Managua – Johanna Madrigal
Miss Earth Nicaragua 2005	Leon - Sandra Rios
Top 5	Achuapa – Sandra Rios; Granada – Rebecca Reynoso Murillo; Estelí – Ariadna Urrutia

== Special awards ==
Other awards include:

- Miss Photogenic - Masaya - Meyling Vilchez
- Best Hair - Carazo - Fanny Ramirez
- Best Smile - Granada - Rebecca Reynoso
- Most Beautiful Face - Tipitapa - Shantall Quintero
- Miss Congeniality - Esteli - Ariadna Urrutia
- Miss Internet - Leon - Sandra Rios (by votes on Miss Nicaragua webpage)

== Contestants ==
Twelve contestants competed for the two titles.

Department/City	Contestant
Achuapa	Fátima Madrigal
Carazo	Fanny Ramirez
Chinandega	Arlen Montoya
Estelí	Ariadna Urrutia
Granada	Rebecca Reynoso Murillo
León	Sandra Rios
Madriz	Mayling Sobalvarro Sampson
Managua	Daniela Clerk
Masaya	Meyling Vilchez
Nueva Segovia	Maritza Campos
Rivas	Honey Hernandez
Tipitapa	Shantall Quintero

Daniela Clerk Castillo is Miss Nicaragua 1995 Linda Clerk Castillo's younger sister.

Shantall Quintero (who now goes by Shantall Lacayo) is an international fashion designer who became a runner up in Project Runway Latin America Season 1 and later won Project Runway (season 19) after relocating to the United States.

== Judges ==
- Pierre Pierson - Nicaragua Vice-Minister of Culture
- Luis Morales Alonso - Nicaraguan Painter
- Margarita Pasos - TV host of Margarita te voy a contar talk show and Director of Successfactor Internacional Business Coaching & Training
- Claudia Alaniz - Miss Nicaragua 1998
