= Miss Nicaragua 2008 =

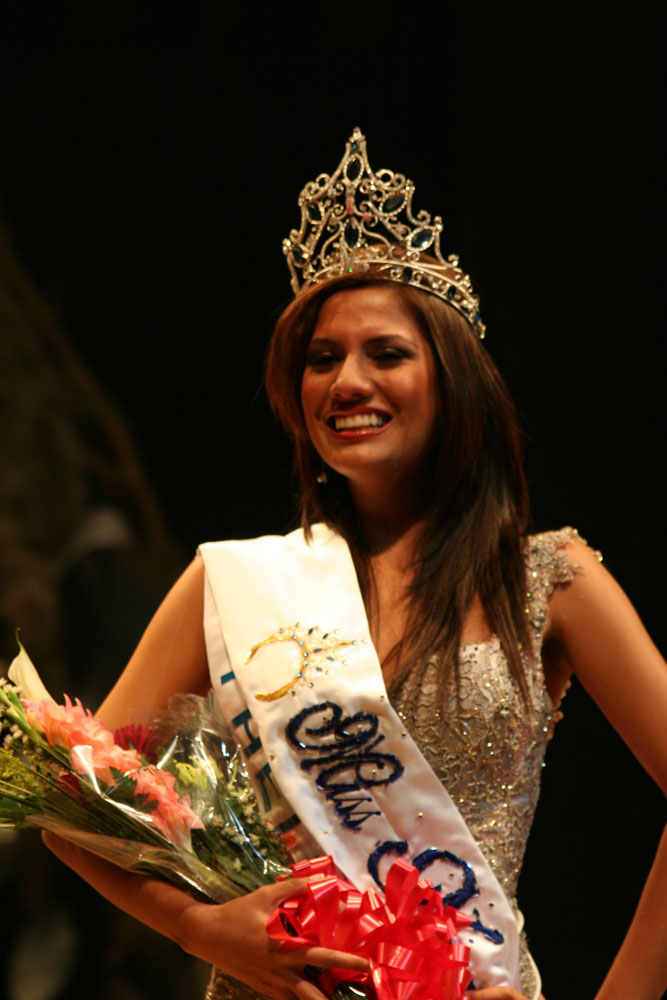
- Thelma Rodríguez, Miss Nicaragua 2008
- Date: February 23, 2008
- Presenters: Bertha Valle
- Venue: Teatro Nacional Rubén Darío, Managua, Nicaragua
- Broadcaster: Televicentro
- Entrants: 15
- Placements: 5
- Winner: Thelma Rodríguez; Chinandega

The Miss Nicaragua 2008 pageant was held on February 23, 2008 in Managua, after weeks of events. At the conclusion of the final night of competition, Thelma Rodríguez won the title of Miss Nicaragua Universe. She represented Nicaragua at Miss Universe 2008 held later in the year in Vietnam.

== Results ==
=== Placements ===
Placement	Contestant
Miss Nicaragua 2008	Chinandega – Thelma Rodríguez
1st Runner-Up	Bluefields – Karina Gordon
2nd Runner-Up	Managua - Gwendolyne García Leets
Top 6	León – Nydia Blandino; Madriz – Amalia Palacios; Tipitapa – Blanca García

== Special awards ==
- Most Beautiful Face - Managua - Gwendolyne García Leets
- Miss Lubriderm Cream - Tipitapa - Blanca García
- Miss Photogenic - Leon - Nydia Blandino
- Miss Congeniality - Leon - Nydia Blandino
- Miss Elegance - Managua - Gwendolyne García Leets
- Best Hair - Managua - Gwendolyne García Leets
- Best Smile - Tipitapa - Blanca García

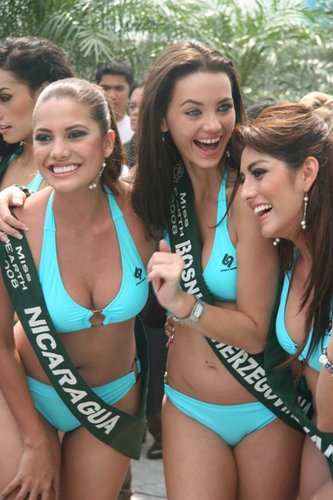
Rodriguez (left), at Miss Earth 2008.

.

== Official Contestants ==
State	Contestant
Bluefields	Karina Gordon
Chinandega	Thelma Rodríguez
Chontales	Cinthya Carolina Vega
Estelí	Belkyss Figueroa
Granada	Ligia Largaespada
Jinotega	Louise Paola Ubeda
Leon	Nydia Blandino
Madriz	Amalia Palacios
Managua	Gwendolyne García Leets
Masaya	Giselle Reyes
Matagalpa	Jassel Jiménez Artola
Nueva Segovia	Alexandra Castillo
RACCN	Ingni Lilka
Sebaco	Sonia Catalina Barba
Tipitapa	Blanca García

.
