= Miss Nicaragua 2014 =

- Date: March 15, 2014
- Presenters: Luis Baez, Valeria Sanchez
- Venue: Teatro Nacional Rubén Darío, Managua, Nicaragua
- Broadcaster: VosTV
- Entrants: 14
- Placements: 6
- Winner: Marline Barberena; Chinandega

The Miss Nicaragua 2014 pageant, was held on March 15, 2014, in Managua, after weeks of events.

The winner was Marline Barberena of Chinandega was crowned Miss Nicaragua 2014. She represented Nicaragua at Miss Universe 2014.

== Results ==
=== Placements ===
Placement	Contestant
Miss Nicaragua 2014	Chinandega – Marline Barberena
1st Runner-Up	Rivas – Jeymmy García
2nd Runner-Up	Masatepe – Paola Quintero
3rd Runner-Up	Masaya – Katherine Guadamuz
4th Runner-Up	Villanueva – Xilonem Quiñonez
5th Runner-up	Corn Islands – Elizabeth Hodson

== Special awards ==
- Most Beautiful Face - Masaya - Katherine Guadamuz
- Miss Photogenic - Masaya - Katherine Guadamuz
- Miss Congeniality - Chontales - Linda Yamaki
- Best Smile - Masaya - Katherine Guadamuz
- Miss Fitness - Chinandega - Marline Barberena
- Miss Popularity - Matagalpa - Kiutza Merdina (by Text votes of CLARO Telecom company)

== Official contestants ==
State	Contestant	Age
Bluefields	Liz Pasos	20
Carazo	Teresa López	25
Chinandega	Marline Barberena	26
Chontales	Linda Yamaki	18
Corn Islands	Elizabeth Hodson	25
Estelí	Gabriela Pauth	25
Jinotega	Heydi Rivera	19
Leon	Christiam López	24
Managua	Desireé Estrada	22
Masatepe	Paola Quintero	19
Masaya	Katherine Guadamuz	18
Matagalpa	Kiutza Merdina	23
Rivas	Jeymmy García	25
Villanueva	Xilonem Quiñonez	21

- This makes it the first time in the pageant's history that a Miss Nicaragua is not crowned by her predecessor, because Nastassja Bolívar got dethroned a month before this pageant. The reason for this dethronement is that Nastassja did not agree to the modeling agreement that is part of the contract that competitors have to sign to compete. According to reports, Nastassja backed out before the Miss Universe 2013 but because they were so short on time, the Miss Nicaragua Orzanization let her represent them anyway on the competition in Russia. Now that the competition is over, they are taking the crown away.
- Marline Barberena was crowned by the hostess Valeria Sanchez instead of the 1st runner-up of 2013 or Mrs. Karen Celebertti, National Director of the Miss Nicaragua Orzanization creating widespread controversy.

== Judges ==
- Luisa Amalia Urcuyo - Miss Nicaragua 1993
- Shantall Lacayo - Fashion Designer
- María Gabriela Vega Gutiérrez - Regional Director of Zoom Communications, LLC
- Mauricio Solorzano - Operations Manager of Compañía Licorera de Nicaragua, S.A
- Dra. Paula Arce - Nutritionist
- Jorge Antonio Vega Umaña - Fashion Designer

== Contestant notes ==
- Marline Barberena, has dual citizenships American and Nicaraguan.
- Desireé Estrada, is of American descent.
- Linda Yamaki, is of Japanese descent.
