= Farah Eslaquit =

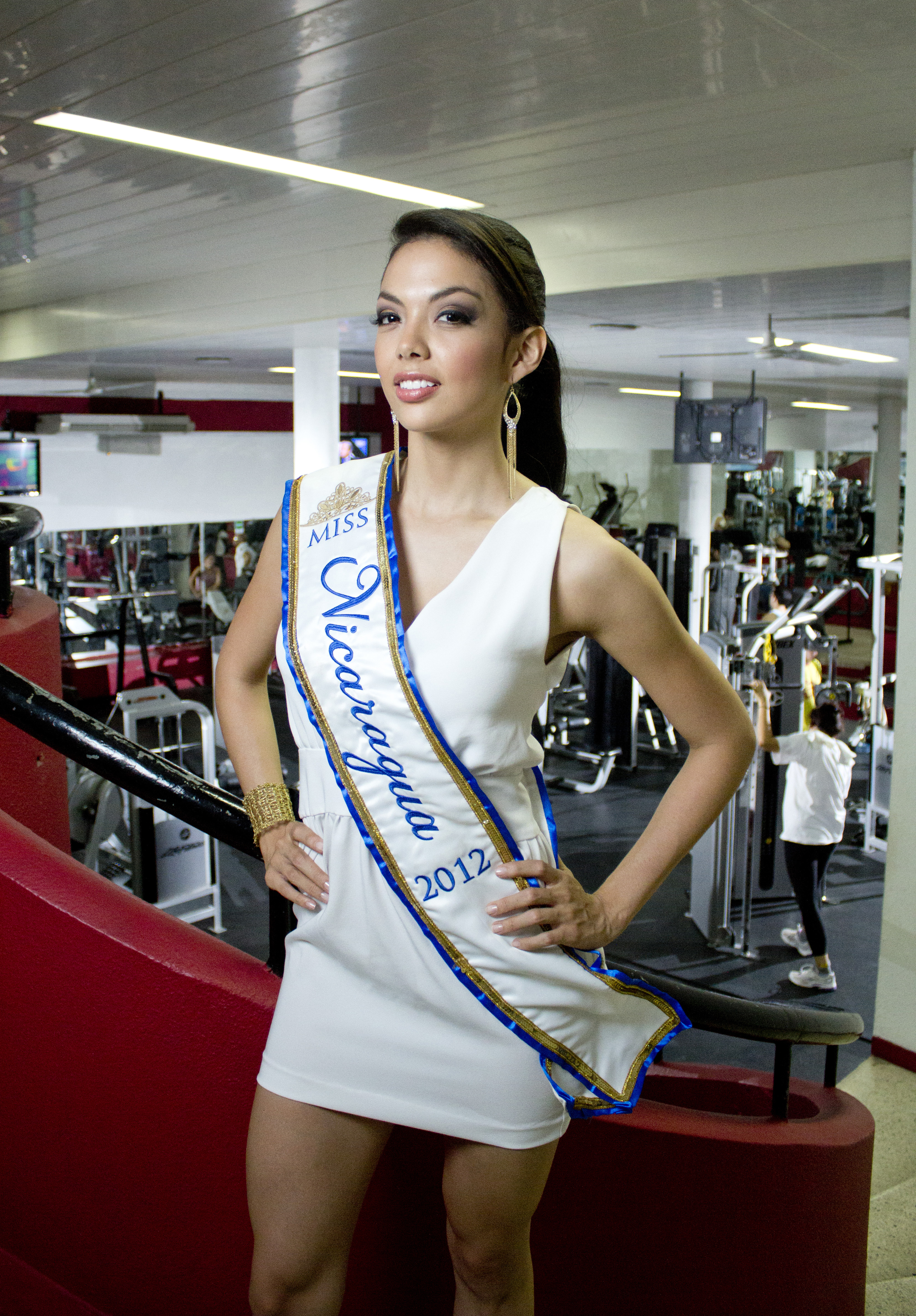
- Miss Nicaragua 2012, Farah Eslaquit.
- Born: Farah Guillermina Eslaquit Cano; 5 December 1991 (age 34); Monterrey, Nuevo León, Mexico
- Height: 1.68 m (5 ft 6 in)
- Beauty pageant titleholder
- Title: Miss Nicaragua 2012
- Major competitions: Miss Nicaragua 2012 (Winner); Miss Universe 2012 (Unplaced)

Farah Guillermina Eslaquit Cano is a Mexican-Nicaraguan model and beauty pageant titleholder who was crowned Miss Nicaragua 2012 and represented her country at Miss Universe 2012. She has a Diploma in Fashion, Modeling and Etiquette Course.

== Miss Nicaragua 2012 ==
The representative for Masaya, Farah Eslaquit was crowned "Miss Nicaragua 2012" by Miss Nicaragua 2011 Adriana Dorn at the Ruben Dario National Theater in Managua on Saturday night of March 17, 2012. Nicaraguan people who follow closely these pageants were a little apprehensive about her being chosen as the representative for Miss Universe 2012, because she was not born in Nicaragua. Claudia Cuadra Cardenal and Alejandra Borge were heavy favorites to win the crown for 2012. She also won the titles of Miss Popularity and Miss Virtual Nicaragua in the national pageant.

As Nicaragua's representative to the Miss Universe pageant, she took the title of 5th Runner-Up for the National Costume competition, ultimately won by China's Xu Jidan.

As of 2014, Eslaquit was modeling in Nicaragua and working with the country's tourism board, among other projects.

Awards and achievements
Preceded by Adriana Dorn	Miss Nicaragua; 2012	Succeeded by Nastassja Bolívar
