= Miss Nicaragua 2019 =

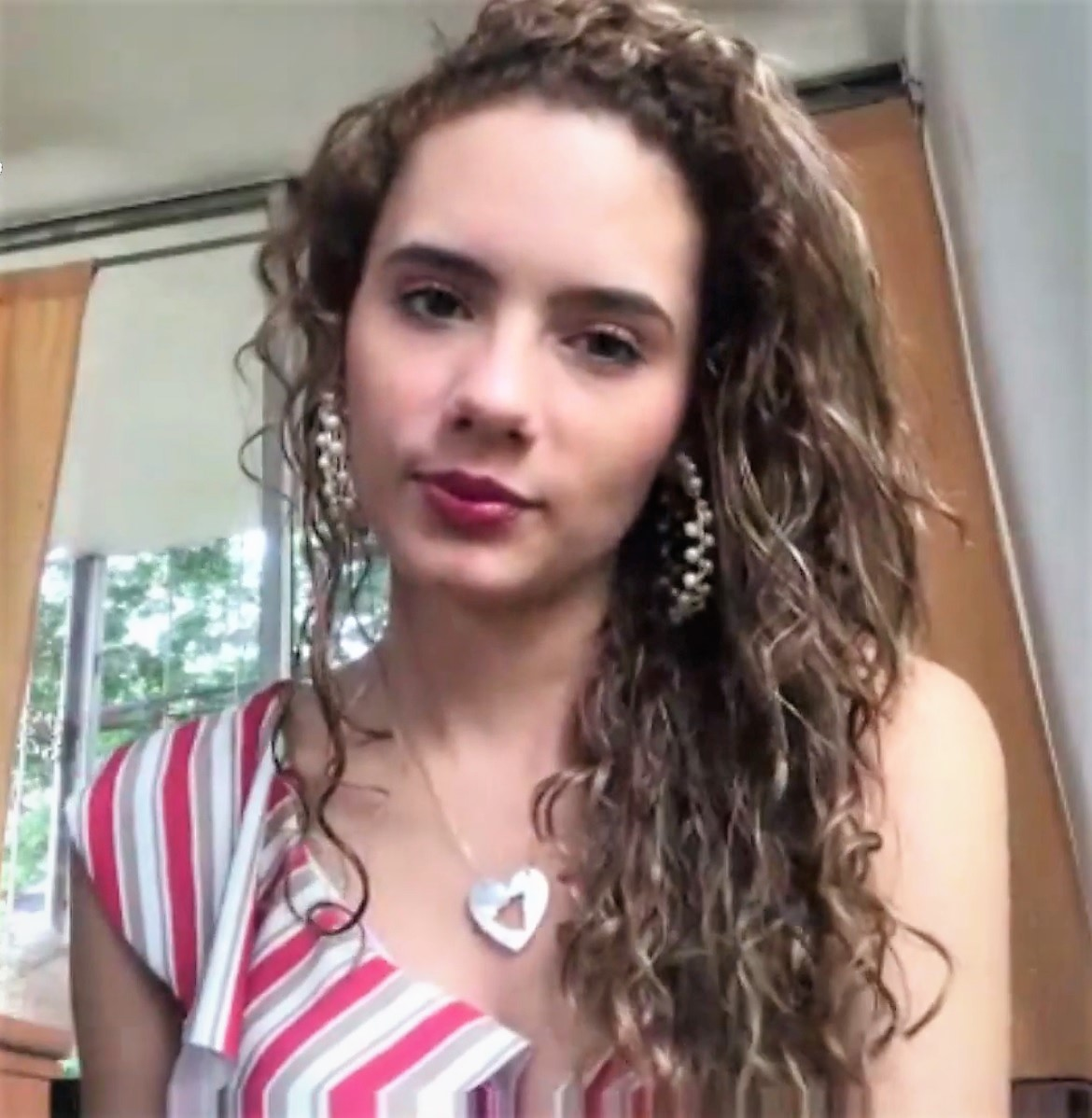
- Inés López Sevilla on Vos TV in 2020
- Date: August 17, 2019
- Presenters: Jorge Hurtado & Valeria Sánchez
- Venue: Holiday Inn Managua - Convention Center, Managua, Nicaragua
- Broadcaster: Live Streaming
- Entrants: 10
- Placements: 5
- Winner: Inés López; Managua

Miss Nicaragua 2019 was held on August 17, 2019, at the Holiday Inn Managua - Convention Center in Managua. At the conclusion of the final night of competition, Ingger Zepeda of Managua, first runner-up of Miss Nicaragua 2018, crowned Inés López of Managua as her successor at the end of the event. López represented Nicaragua at Miss Universe 2019.

== Results ==
=== Placements ===
Placement	Contestant
Miss Nicaragua 2019	Managua – Inés López
1st Runner-Up	Jinotega – Sugey Ruiz
2nd Runner-Up	Managua – Emily Julieta Moran
3rd Runner-Up	Managua – Jocelyn Berríos
4th Runner-Up	Estelí – Ingrid Tatiana Perez

== Special awards ==
Special Awards	Contestant
Miss Photogenic	Managua - Jocelyn Berríos
Best Smile	Managua - Emily Julieta Moran
Most Beautiful Face	Managua - Jocelyn Berríos
Best Style	Managua - Emily Julieta Moran

== Official Contestants ==
10 contestants competed for the title of Miss Nicaragua 2019.

#	Contestant	Age	Height	Hometown	Profession	Placements
1	Allison Lacayo	18	1.67 m (5 ft 6 in)	Leon	Law student	
2	Emily Julieta Moran	20	1.68 m (5 ft 6 in)	Managua	Dentistry student	2nd Runner-Up
3	Hellen Rojas	20	1.65 m (5 ft 5 in)	Carazo	Industrial engineering	
4	Inés López Sevilla	19	1.76 m (5 ft 9 in)	Managua	International right	Miss Nicaragua 2019
5	Ingrid Tatiana Perez	26	1.73 m (5 ft 8 in)	Estelí	Business administration and public notary	4th Runner-Up
6	Jocelyn Berríos	19	1.65 m (5 ft 5 in)	Managua	Businesswoman	3rd Runner-Up
7	Maria Celeste Esquivel	20	1.67 m (5 ft 6 in)	Masaya	Industrial engineering	
8	Sugey Ruiz	26	1.67 m (5 ft 6 in)	Jinotega	Industrial engineering	1st Runner-Up
9	Waymara Antonio	22	1.71 m (5 ft 7 in)	Puerto Cabezas	Styling	
10	Yorlene Esther Duarte	19	1.67 m (5 ft 6 in)	Managua	Medical student	
