= Miss Nicaragua 2011 =

Beauty pageant

- Date: February 26, 2011
- Presenters: Ivan Taylor; Xiomara Blandino
- Venue: Teatro Nacional Rubén Darío, Managua, Nicaragua
- Broadcaster: Televicentro
- Entrants: 14
- Placements: 5
- Winner: Adriana Dorn; Managua

The Miss Nicaragua 2011 pageant, was held on February 26, 2011 in Managua, after weeks of events. At the conclusion of the final night of competition, Adriana Dorn became the new Miss Nicaragua Universe. She represented Nicaragua at Miss Universe 2011 held in Sao Paulo, Brazil, later that year.

== Results ==
=== Placements ===
Placement	Contestant
Miss Nicaragua 2011	Managua – Adriana Dorn
1st Runner-Up	Granada – Lauren Lawson
2nd Runner-Up	Matagalpa – Priscilla Ferrufino
Top 5	Tipitapa – María Esther Cortes; Río San Juan – María Alejandra McConnell

== Special awards ==
- Best Regional Costume - Masaya - Marling Torrez
- Miss Silhouette - Granada - Lauren Lawson
- Most Beautiful Face - Managua - Adriana Dorn
- Miss Photogenic - Blufields - Angela Nicole Brooks
- Miss Congeniality - Tipitapa - María Esther Cortes
- Best Smile - Granada - Lauren Lawson

== Official Contestants ==
State	Contestant
Bluefields	Angela Brooks
Carazo	Kian Morales
Chontales	Guiselle Alvarez
Estelí	Ana Francis Lorente
Granada	Lauren Lawson
Leon	Fátima Flores
Madriz	Marling Torrez
Managua	Adriana Dorn
Masaya	Oriana Chamorro
Matagalpa	Priscilla Ferrufino
Nueva Segovia	Dania Lisseth Caceres
Río San Juan	María Alejandra McConnell
Rivas	Amalia Martinez
Tipitapa	María Esther Cortes

== Trivia ==
- Adriana Dorn was among the favorites contestants to take the title during Miss Universe 2011 but failed to place as a semifinalist.
- Lauren Lawson was appointed to represent her nation in Miss World 2012. She was chosen among other contestants to take part in the "Dances of the World" segment.
- Maria Esther Cortes was crowned Miss Mundo Nicaragua 2014 and she earned the right to represent her nation at Miss World 2014 but she was later dethroned for undisclosed reasons. Yumara López took over as the Nicaraguan entry for the aforementioned pageant.

.

== Judges ==
- Fernando Fuentes Fraile - Fashion Designer
- Dr. Ivan Mendieta Herdocia - - President of Centro Dental de Especialidades S.A
- Lorena Roque - Operations Manager of Univision Communications
- Rene Gonzalez Mejia - President of National Culture Institute
- Juan Ramon Luis Garcia - Professional Hair Stylist
- Maria Auxiliadora Bea Zamora - Representative of UNILEVER Nicaragua S.A
- Leonel Gonzalez Bendaña - Owner of G&B Boutique
- Rafael Garzon - Nicaraguan Goldsmith
- Luis Pastor Gonzalez - Nicaraguan Composer & Singer

.

== Background Music ==
- Opening Show – Camerata Bach - "Nicaragua Mia"
- Swimsuit Competition - Stromae - Alors on Danse
- Evening Gown Competition – Cuando Vuelva A Tu Lado (Instrumental)

.

== Special Guests ==
- Xolo Batucada - "Nicaragua Mia"

.
