= Miss Nicaragua 2016 =

- Date: March 5, 2016
- Presenters: Luis Báez; Claudia Salmerón
- Venue: Teatro Nacional Rubén Darío, Managua, Nicaragua
- Broadcaster: VosTV
- Entrants: 14
- Winner: Marina Jacoby; Matagalpa

The Miss Nicaragua 2016 pageant, was held on March 5, 2016 in Managua, after several weeks of events. At the conclusion of the final night of competition, Marina Jacoby from Matagalpa won the title.

== Results ==
=== Placements ===
Placement	Contestant
Miss Nicaragua 2016	Matagalpa – Marina Jacoby
Miss Nicaragua World 2016	Masaya – María Laura Ramírez
Miss Nicaragua International 2016	Managua – Brianny Chamorro
1st Runner-Up	RACCN – Virgina Chow
Top 7	Diriamba – Michelle Lacayo; Carazo – Bianca Gutiérrez; Chinandega – Maria José Salazar

== Special awards ==
- Best Hair - Managua - Brianny Chamorro
- Miss La Prensa - Chontales - Jahaira Rosales
- Miss Elegance - RACCN - Virgina Chow
- Best Smile - Matagalpa - Marina Jacoby
- Miss Photogenic - Managua - Brianny Chamorro
- Miss Congeniality - Mateare - Jeimy López
- Most Beautiful Face - Carazo - Bianca Gutiérrez

== Contestants ==
Fourteen contestants competed for the three titles.

Department/City	Contestant
Carazo	Bianca Gutiérrez
Chinandega	Maria José Salazar
Chontales	Jahaira Rosales
Diriamba	Michelle Lacayo
Estelí	Karla Luna
Granada	Francela Gutiérrez
Jinotega	María Alejandra Alfaro
Managua	Brianny Chamorro
Masaya	María Laura Ramírez
Matagalpa	Marina Jacoby
Mateare	Jeimy López
RACCN	Virgina Chow
Río San Juan	Fabiola Rodríguez
Tipitapa	Katiuska Vélez

== Trivia ==
- Matagalpa has to wait 40 years to recover the crown. Marina Jacoby became the third Queen from this region to win since the Miss Nicaragua pageant began in 1955. The first one was Margine Davidson, Miss Nicaragua 1968, and the other one was Ivania Navarro, Miss Nicaragua 1976.
- Viewers were able to interact with the pageant via Movistar. Fans were able to vote for their favorite contestant through the Miss Nicaragua website, from February 5 to March 5. Miss Chinandega, Maria José Salazar, won the most MSM votes among the contestants, winning her spot in the Top 6.

== Judges ==
- Dr. Luis Douglas Contreras - General Manager of Dental Care
- Arquimedes Gonzalez - Editor of La Prensa Magazine
- Julio Rosales - Professional Photographer
- Melissa Fagot - Administrative Manager of Med Spa©
- Juan Brenes - Professional Hair Stylist
- Maria Eugenia Cuadra - Representative of Ivana's Boutique
- Kelly Molina - Fashion Designer
- Rafael Garzon - Nicaraguan Goldsmith

== Background Music ==
- Opening Show – Luis Enrique Mejía Godoy & Tierra Fértil - "Raíces Americanas"
- Swimsuit Competition – Party Station - "DJ Techno Re-Mix Medley"
- Evening Gown Competition – James Pants - "Neverland"
