= Miss Nicaragua 2012 =

- Date: March 17, 2012
- Presenters: Ivan Peña & Cindy Regidor
- Venue: Teatro Nacional Rubén Darío, Managua, Nicaragua
- Broadcaster: Televicentro
- Entrants: 13
- Winner: Farah Eslaquit; Masaya

The Miss Nicaragua 2012 pageant, was held on March 17, 2012, in Managua, after weeks of events.

== Results ==
=== Placements ===
Placement	Contestant
Miss Nicaragua 2012	Masaya – Farah Eslaquit
Miss Nicaragua International 2012	Chinandega – Reyna Peréz
Miss Nicaragua Earth 2012	Río San Juan – Braxis Alvarez
Top 6	León – Keykoll Montalván; Granada – Violeta Majano; Managua – Claudia Cuadra Cardenal

== Special awards ==
- Most Beautiful Face - Diriamba - Alejandra Borge
- Miss Congeniality - Bluefields - Ivy Hunter
- Miss Photogenic - Leon - Keykoll Montalván
- Best Smile - Diriamba - Alejandra Borge
- Miss Fitness - Managua - Claudia Cuadra Cardenal
- Miss Popularity - Masaya - Farah Eslaquit (by Text votes of Llamadas Heladas®)

== Official Contestants ==
State	Contestant
Bluefields	Ivy Hunter
Boaco	Katherine Ivonn Salinas
Carazo	Ana Verónica Arellano
Chinandega	Reyna Perez
Diriamba	Alejandra Borge
Estelí	Dania Gonzàlez
Granada	Violeta Majano
Jinotega	Leydi Zeledon
Leon	Keykoll Montalvan
Managua	Claudia Cuadra Cardenal
Masaya	Farah Eslaquit
Río San Juan	Braxis Alvarez Ochomogo
Tipitapa	Alma Huerta

== Trivia ==
- This was the last Miss Nicaragua show to be aired on Televicentro. Beginning with the next Miss Nicaragua pageant, VosTV assumed co-ownership of the pageant along with Silhuetas Models S.A, and as a result began televising the pageant.

.

== Judges ==
- Carlos Mejia Godoy - Nicaraguan Composer & Singer
- Ashley Lauren Kerr - Fashion Designer
- Eduardo Guevara - Representative of Delta Air Lines, Inc.
- Graciela Fontecha - Puerto Rican Beauty Queen's Coach
- Luis Morales Alonso - Director of National Culture Institute
- Dra. Yelrana Pereira - Regional Manager of FABRIZIO GIANNONE©
- Dr. Luis Raez - Vice-president of CONANCA

.

== Special Guests ==
- Luis Pastor Gonzalez - "La Cumbia Chinandegana" & "Como te quiero Nicaragua"

.
