= Miss Nicaragua 2010 =

- Date: February 27, 2010
- Presenters: Ivan Taylor; Bertha Valles; Xiomara Blandino
- Venue: Teatro Nacional Rubén Darío, Managua, Nicaragua
- Broadcaster: Televicentro
- Entrants: 12
- Placements: 6
- Winner: Scharllette Allen Moses; Bluefields

The Miss Nicaragua 2010 pageant, was held on February 27, 2010 in Managua, after weeks of events. At the conclusion of the final night of competition, Scharllette Allen Moses became the first Miss Nicaragua titleholder from the Caribbean Coast of Nicaragua. She represented Nicaragua at Miss Universe 2010 held later that year in Las Vegas, Nevada.

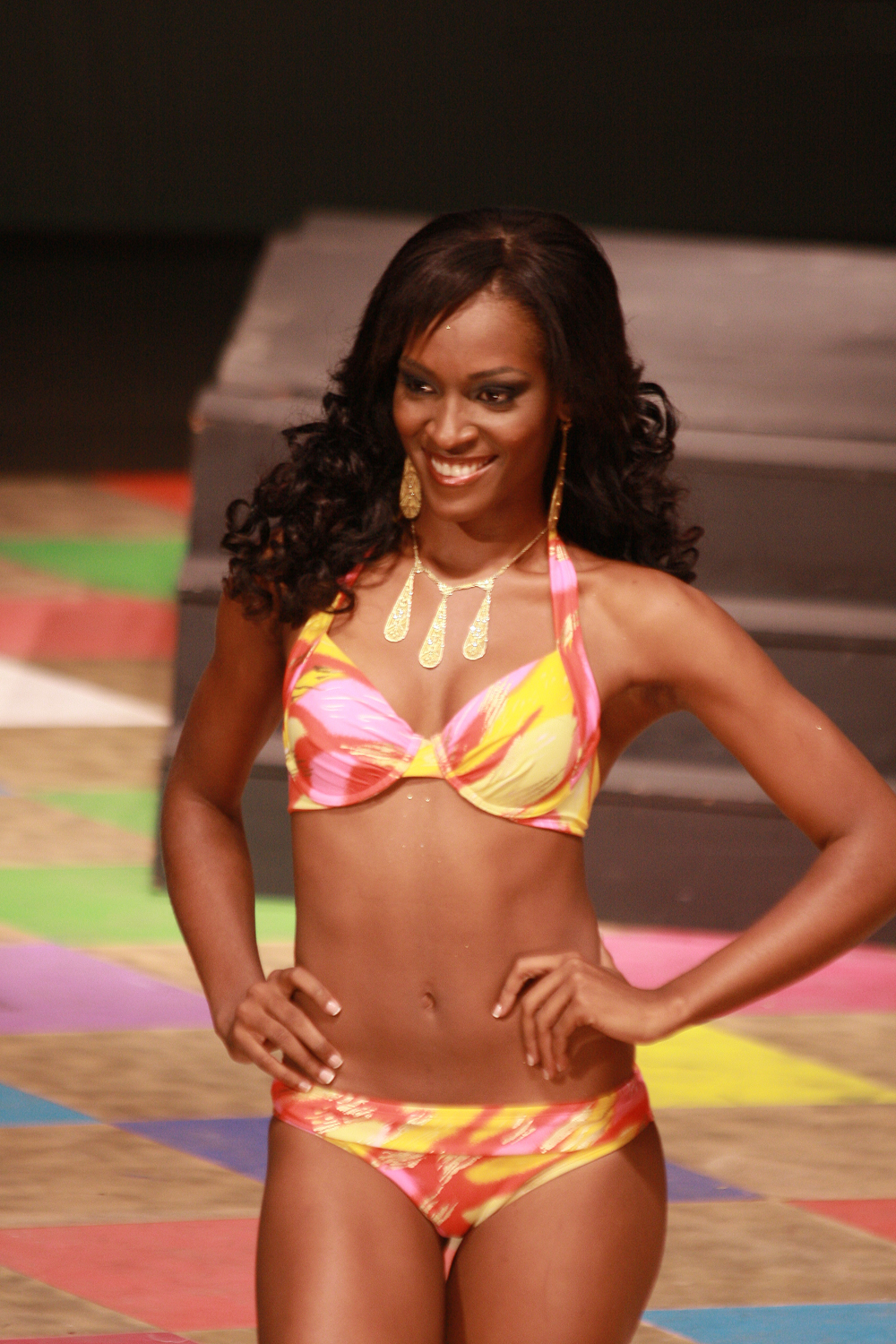
Allen in 2010.

== Results ==
=== Placements ===
| Placement | Contestant |
|---|---|
| Miss Nicaragua 2010 | Bluefields – Scharllette Allen Moses |
| Miss Nicaragua International 2010 | Rivas – Indira Rojas |
| 1st Runner-Up | León – Claudia Trejos |
| Top 6 | Granada – Bianca Martínez; Carazo – Myriam Alejandra Cerda; Nandaime – Jennifer Cuadra |

== Special awards ==
- Best Regional Costume - Managua - Maryoli Cabezas
- Most Beautiful Face - Bluefields - Scharllette Allen
- Miss Photogenic - Estelí - Meyling Merlo
- Miss Congeniality - San Juan de Limay - Jeyzzell Rivera
- Miss Nicaraguan Proud - Carazo - Myriam Alejandra Cerda
- Best Hair - Rivas - Indira Rojas

== Contestants ==
The following people were contestants:

| State | Contestant |
|---|---|
| Bluefields | Scharllette Allen Moses |
| Carazo | Myriam Alejandra Cerda |
| Estelí | Meyling Merlo |
| Granada | Bianca Martínez |
| Jinotega | Georgina Benavides |
| Leon | Claudia Trejos |
| Managua | Maryoli Cabezas |
| Nandaime | Jennifer Cuadra |
| Nueva Segovia | Karen Somarriba |
| Rivas | Indira Rojas |
| San Juan de Limay | Jeyzzell Rivera |
| Tipitapa | Ludy Prado |
