= Sheynnis Palacios =

Nicaraguan beauty pageant titleholder and Miss Universe 2023 (born 2000)

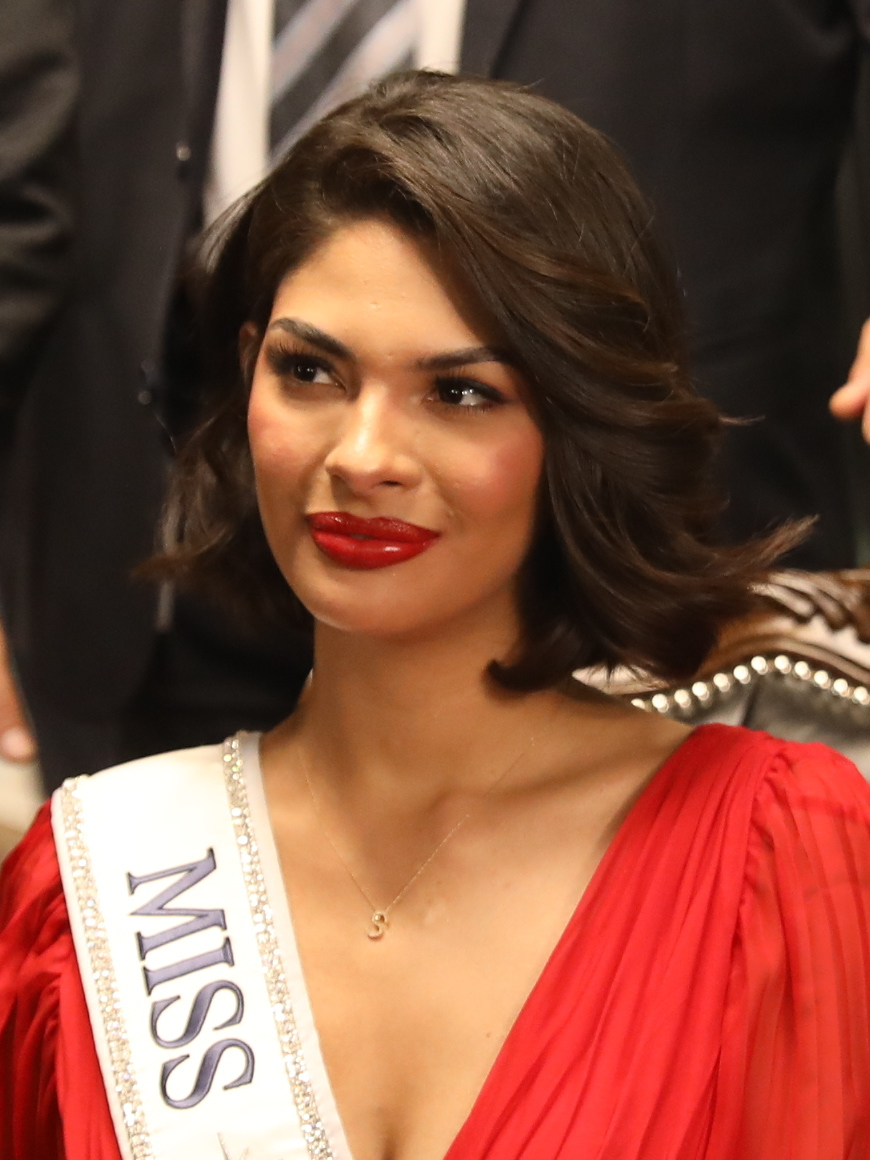
- Palacios in 2024
- Born: Sheynnis Alondra Palacios Cornejo; 30 May 2000 (age 26); Managua, Nicaragua
- Education: Central American University
- Height: 1.80 m (5 ft 11 in)
- Beauty pageant titleholder
- Title: Miss Teen Nicaragua 2016; Miss Mundo Nicaragua 2020; Miss Nicaragua 2023; Miss Universe 2023
- Major competitions: Miss Mundo Nicaragua 2020; (Winner); Miss World 2022; (Top 40); Miss Nicaragua 2023; (Winner); Miss Universe 2023; (Winner)

Sheynnis Alondra Palacios Cornejo (Latin American Spanish pronunciation: [ʃejˈnis palaˈsjos]; born 30 May 2000) is a Nicaraguan model and beauty pageant titleholder who won Miss Universe 2023. Having previously won Miss Nicaragua 2023, she is the first Nicaraguan to win Miss Universe.

Prior to Miss Universe, Palacios competed in Miss World 2021 as Miss World Nicaragua 2020, reaching the top 40.

== Early life and education ==
Sheynnis Alondra Palacios Cornejo was born on 30 May 2000, at Hospital Alemán Nicaragüense in Managua to parents Raquel Guadalupe Cornejo Pichardo and Édgar Arístides Palacios García. Palacios later grew up in the town of Diriamba in Carazo Department, and was educated at La Salle Managua Pedagogical Institute in Managua. At the school, she won the Miss Lasallista beauty pageant, beginning her interest in pageantry. Afterwards, Palacios enrolled in the Central American University in Managua, graduating with a bachelor's degree in mass communication in 2022. While a university student, Palacios played on her school's varsity volleyball team. In order to pay for her education, Palacios made and sold buñuelos with her mother and maternal grandmother, for which she was bullied at school. In her youth, Palacios suffered from anxiety attacks, which later inspired her to adopt mental health awareness as her pageant platform.

Prior to becoming Miss Universe, Palacios was working as a model, television presenter, and journalist in Nicaragua, and presented a show called Entiende tu mente, which discussed topics related to mental health.

== Pageantry ==
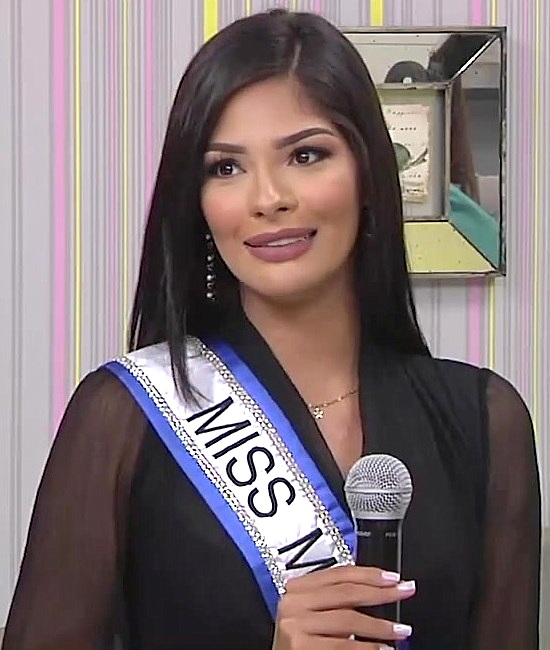
Palacios as Miss World Nicaragua 2020

Palacios's first national pageant was in 2016, where she won Miss Teen Nicaragua 2016. She went on to represent her country at Teen Universe 2017, where she reached the top six.

She later took a break from pageantry until returning to compete in Miss World Nicaragua 2020, which she went on to win. As Miss World Nicaragua, Palacios represented Nicaragua at Miss World 2021. Miss World 2021 was originally planned to be held in San Juan, Puerto Rico on 16 December 2021. Two days prior to the pageant's broadcast, several cases of COVID-19 were reported amongst contestants and staff. This led to the postponement of the pageant's final show, to 16 March 2022, with only the 40 selected semi-finalists being invited to return to compete. Palacios was selected as one of the 40, but did not advance further.

Palacios won Miss Nicaragua 2023 in August 2023, earning the right to represent her country at Miss Universe 2023.

=== Miss Universe 2023 ===
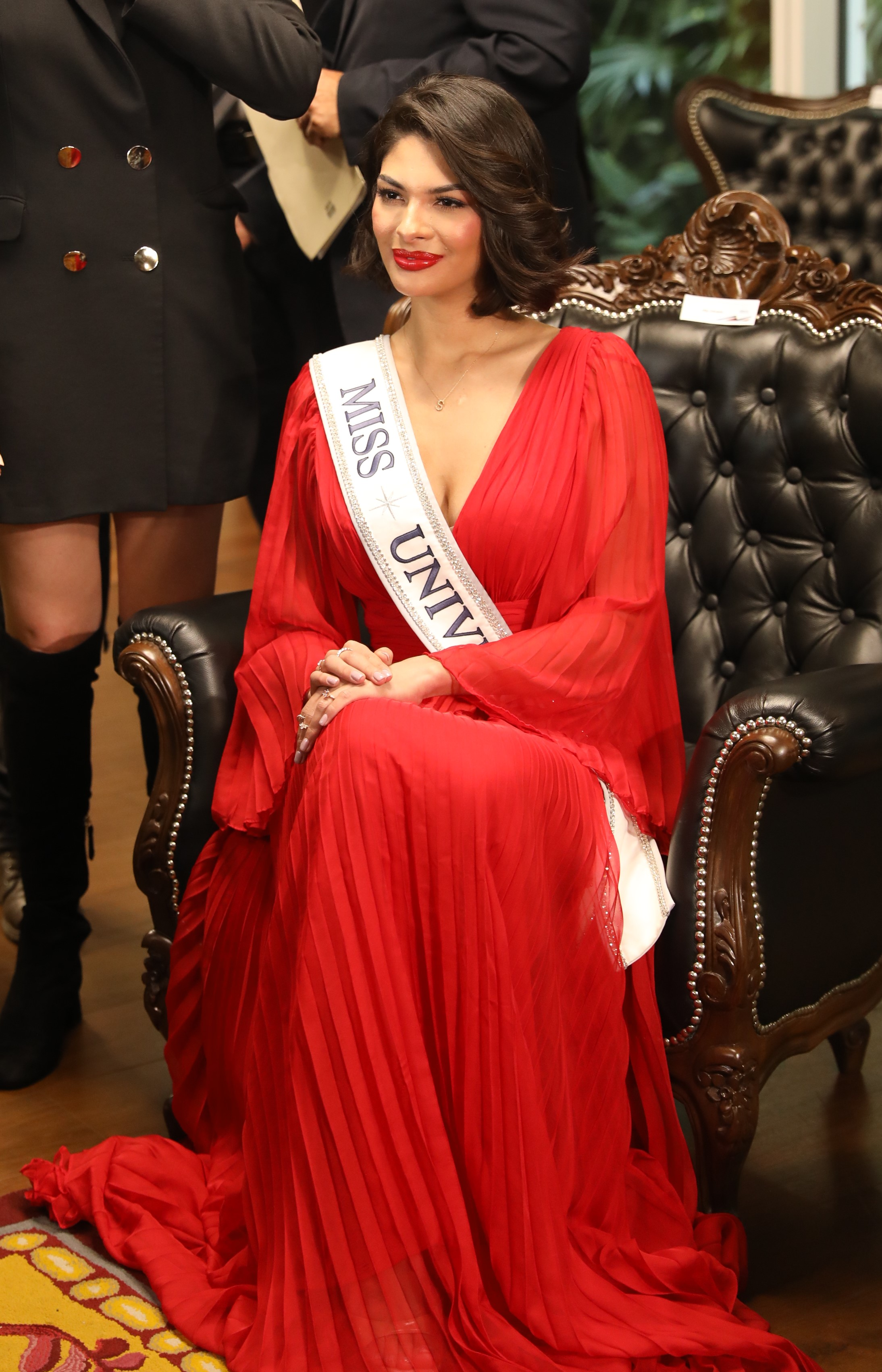
Palacios in Costa Rica.

As Miss Nicaragua, Palacios competed in and won Miss Universe 2023, on 18 November in San Salvador, El Salvador. She was crowned wearing a crystal-embellished gown in blue and white, possibly inspired by the national flags of both Nicaragua and El Salvador. The dress was also interpreted as a symbol against the Ortega government because these colors have been adopted by the opposition as a sign of resistance to Ortega’s regime. Some commentary during and after the event also noted interpretations that the colors and styling referenced depictions of the Virgin Mary.

Palacios became the first Nicaraguan to be crowned Miss Universe, and the first Nicaraguan to win any of the Big Four international beauty pageants. She is also the first Central American to win Miss Universe outright, following Justine Pasek of Panama who became Miss Universe 2002 following the resignation of original winner Oxana Fedorova.

During her reign as Miss Universe she visited at least 31 countries, becoming the most traveled Miss Universe winner and international beauty queen overall of all time. Palacios visited countries in Asia, Europe, the Americas and Africa. In total, she went to 31 countries, including: United States, Mexico, Indonesia, Qatar, Brazil, Costa Rica, Thailand, Laos, Cambodia, China, Philippines, India, Albania, France, Greece, Colombia, Ecuador, Puerto Rico, Dominican Republic, Bahamas, Turks and Caicos, Kenya, Zimbabwe, Nepal, Peru, Monaco, Jamaica and Bolivia.

==== Reception in Nicaragua ====
Palacios's Miss Universe win was controversial in Nicaragua due to pictures of her participation in the 2018–2022 Nicaraguan protests against President Daniel Ortega. Palacios's win was celebrated by members of the Nicaraguan opposition, which led to Vice President and First Lady Rosario Murillo denouncing what she called "evil, terrorist commentators making a clumsy and insulting attempt to turn what should be a beautiful and well-deserved moment of pride into destructive coup-mongering." Ortega's government initially expressed "legitimate joy and pride" following Palacios's win at the pageant, but later reportedly prevented two artists from completing a mural dedicated to Palacios in the city of Estelí.

Nicaraguan police also accused Karen Celebertti, the owner of the Miss Nicaragua franchise, of deliberately rigging beauty contests in favor of competitors critical of the government as part of a coup plot, leading to her retiring from the Nicaraguan pageant industry shortly afterwards. On 13 February 2024, Celebertti announced she would be the new director of talent development for the Miss Universe Organization.

== Personal life ==
In September 2024, she confirmed that she was in a relationship with Carlos Gómez "El Cañón", a former Venezuelan baseball player.

Awards and achievements
Preceded by (United States) R'Bonney Gabriel	Miss Universe; 2023	Succeeded by (Denmark) Victoria Kjær Theilvig
Preceded by Norma Huembes (Carazo)	Miss Nicaragua; 2023	Succeeded by Geyssell García (Chontales)
Preceded by María Teresa Cortez	Miss World Nicaragua; 2020	Succeeded by Mariela Cerros
