= Adriana Dorn =

Nicaraguan beauty pageant titleholder

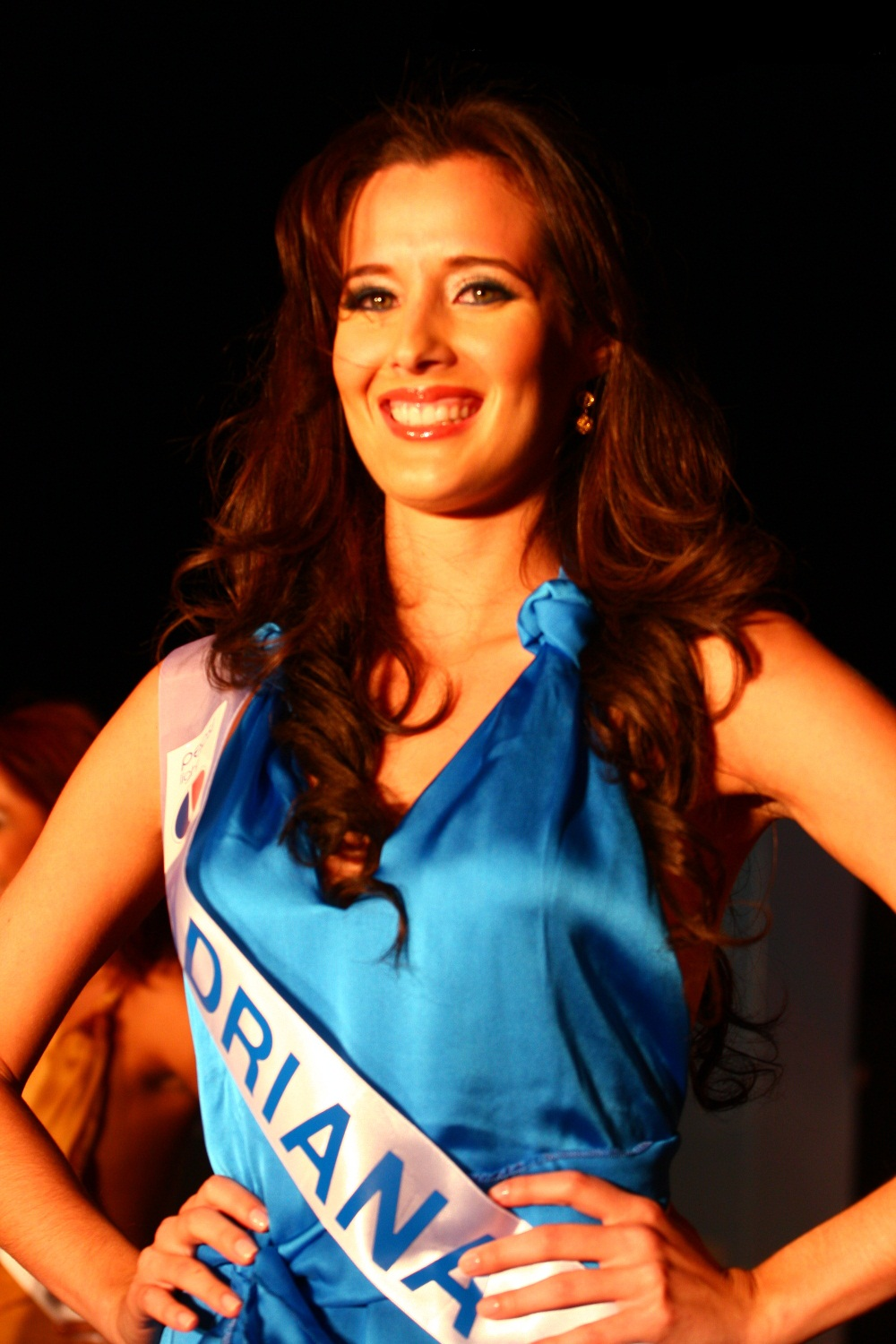
- Born: Adriana de Lourdes Dorn Rodríguez; December 30, 1986 (age 39); Managua, Nicaragua
- Education: Penn State University
- Occupation: Public relations executive
- Height: 1.75 m (5 ft 9 in)
- Beauty pageant titleholder
- Title: Miss Nicaragua 2011
- Hair color: Brown
- Eye color: Green
- Major competitions: Miss Nicaragua 2011 (Winner) (Best Face); Miss Universe 2011

Adriana de Lourdes Dorn Rodríguez (born December 30, 1986) is a Nicaraguan beauty pageant titleholder who was crowned Miss Nicaragua 2011 and represented her country in the 2011 Miss Universe.

== Early life ==
Born in Managua, Dorn holds a bachelor's degree in public relations with a minor in business management, human development and family studies at Penn State University. She is currently completing postgraduate studies in marketing management.

== Miss Nicaragua ==
Dorn, who stands 1.75 m (5 ft 9 in) tall, competed as one of 14 finalists in her country's national beauty pageant, Miss Nicaragua, held in Managua on February 26, 2011, where she obtained the Best Face award and became the eventual winner of the title, gaining the right to represent Nicaragua in the 2011 Miss Universe pageant, broadcast live from São Paulo, Brazil on September 12, 2011.

Awards and achievements
Preceded by Scharllette Allen	Miss Nicaragua; 2011	Succeeded by Farah Eslaquit
