= Scharllette Allen Moses =

Nicaraguan beauty pageant titleholder (born 1991)

Scharllette Allen
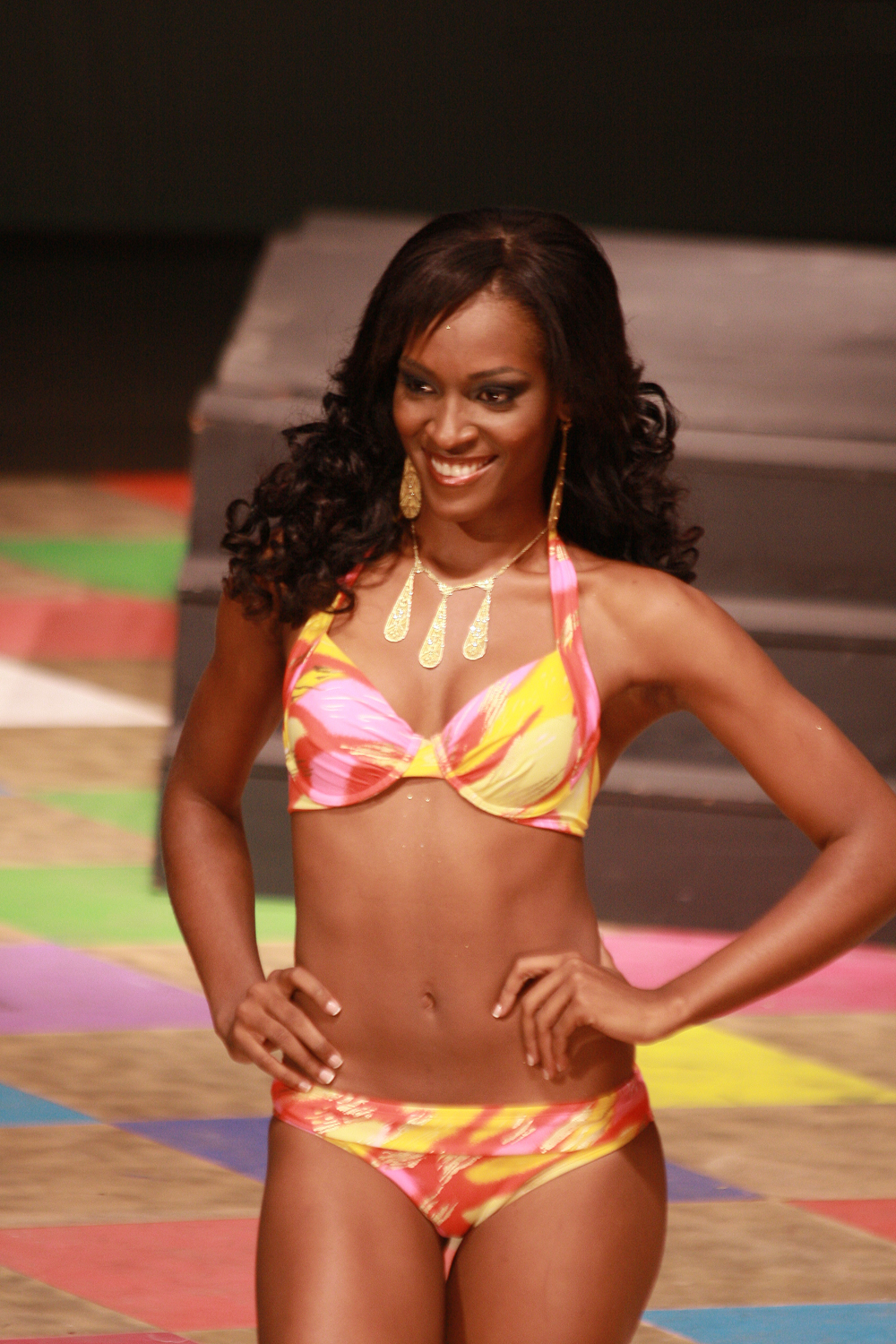
- Born: Scharllette Alexandra Allen Moses; September 18, 1991 (age 35); Bluefields, Nicaragua
- Height: 5 ft 11 in (1.80 m)
- Beauty pageant titleholder
- Title: Miss Nicaragua 2010
- Hair color: Black
- Eye color: Brown
- Major competitions: Miss Nicaragua 2010 (Winner) (Best Face); Miss Universe 2010 (Unplaced)

Scharllette Alexandra Allen Moses (born September 18, 1991) is a Nicaraguan beauty pageant titleholder from Bluefields who became the first woman of Afro-Nicaraguan background to win the title of Miss Nicaragua and represent her country in the 2010 Miss Universe pageant.

== Miss Nicaragua ==
Allen, who stands 1.80 m (5 ft 11 in) tall, competed as one of 12 finalists in her country's national beauty pageant, Miss Nicaragua, held in Managua on February 27, 2011, where she obtained the Best Face award and became the first black woman to ever win the national crown, gaining the right to represent Nicaragua in Miss Universe 2010.

Allen was also on the list of those named Personalities of the Year in her home country, announced in the national and local media on December 31, 2010.

== Miss Universe 2010 ==
As the official representative of her country to the 2010 Miss Universe pageant broadcast live from Las Vegas, Nevada on August 23, Allen participated as one of the 83 delegates who vied for the crown of eventual winner, Ximena Navarrete of Mexico.

Awards and achievements
Preceded by Indiana Sánchez	Miss Nicaragua; 2010	Succeeded by Adriana Dorn
Preceded by Indiana Sánchez	Miss Continente Americano Nicaragua; 2010	Succeeded by Fátima Flores
