= Marina Jacoby =

Nicaraguan beauty queen

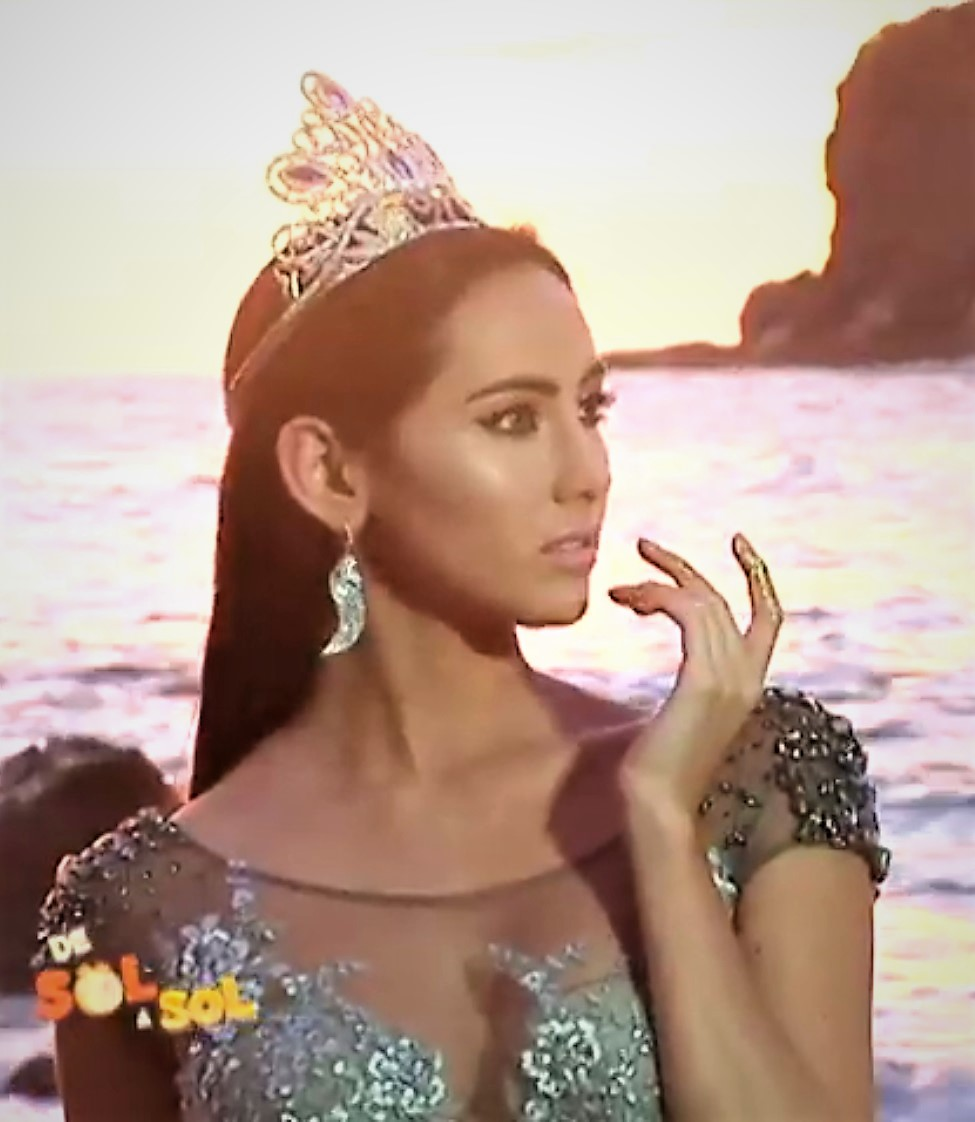
- Jacoby in 2016
- Born: 3 August 1995 (age 31); Matagalpa, Nicaragua
- Height: 1.75 m (5 ft 9 in)
- Beauty pageant titleholder
- Title: Miss Nicaragua 2016
- Hair color: Brown
- Eye color: Brown
- Major competitions: Miss Teen Nicaragua 2011 (1st runner-up); Miss Teenager Universe 2011 (4th runner-up); Miss Nicaragua 2016 (Winner); Miss Universe 2016 (Unplaced)

Marina Eugenia Jacoby Santos (born August 3, 1995) is a Nicaraguan beauty pageant titleholder who was crowned Miss Nicaragua 2016. She represented Nicaragua at the Miss Universe 2016 pageant.

== Miss Nicaragua 2016 ==
Jacoby said that, as Miss Nicaragua, she would be involved in initiatives to eradicate harassment, whether physical, verbal or cyber bullying . “Your best recipe for this type of attack has been to ignore them and turn the page.” I want to make kids raise their self-esteem so they can develop their potential."

Jacoby won the title of Miss Nicaragua 2016 on March 5, 2016. She was crowned by her predecessor, Daniela Torres of Managua.

As Miss Nicaragua 2016, Jacoby competed at the Miss Universe 2016 pageant but unplaced despite being one of the favorite misses to win the Miss Universe title. At the end of the event the fortunate winner of the Miss Universe title was Iris Mittenaere, Miss France.

Awards and achievements
Preceded by Daniela Torres	Miss Nicaragua; 2016	Succeeded by Berenice Quezada
