= Miss Nicaragua 2020 =

- Date: August 8, 2020
- Presenters: Berenice Quezada; Valeria Sánchez
- Entertainment: Academia de danza de Francisco Gonzales; Evenor Gonzales; Dj Lydia; Mr.Saxobeat
- Venue: Holiday INN, Managua, Nicaragua
- Broadcaster: Vos TV
- Entrants: 8
- Placements: 4
- Debuts: Siuna
- Withdrawals: Masaya; Puerto Cabezas
- Returns: Chinandega; Chontales
- Winner: Ana Marcelo; Esteli
- Congeniality: Ana Silva Toledo; Managua

Miss Nicaragua 2020 was held in Managua, Nicaragua on August 8, 2020. Out of eight entrants, Ana Marcelo, of Corinto, Nicaragua, won.

== Results ==
=== Placements ===
Placement	Contestant
Miss Nicaragua 2020	Estelí – Ana Marcelo
1st Runner-Up (Miss Universe Nicaragua 2024)	Chontales – Geyssell García
2nd Runner-Up	Chinandega – Cindy Bustamante
3rd Runner-Up	RACCN – Magdalena Jarquín

== Delegates ==
Department	Contestant	Age (Note: Ages at the time of the pageant)	Hometown	Placement	Notes
Carazo	Leyani Luna Ruiz	23	Diriamba		
Chinandega	Cindy Bustamante	24	Chichigalpa	2nd Runner-up	Miss Teen Nicaragua 2014
Chontales	Geyssell García	25	Santo Tomás	1st Runner-up	Later Miss Universe Nicaragua 2024
Esteli	Ana Marcelo	24	Corinto	Miss Nicaragua 2020	Miss Teen Américas Nicaragua 2015
Leon	Jennifer Cáceres	26	León		
Managua	Tamara Elizabeth Ríos	26	Managua		
Managua	Ana Silva Toledo	27	Ciudad Sandino		
RACCN	Magdalena Jarquín	26	Siuna	3rd Runner Up	
