= Norma Huembes =

Nicaraguan model

- Born: San Marcos, Nicaragua

Norma Huembes is a Nicaraguan beauty pageant titleholder who won Miss Nicaragua 2022 on August 6, 2022, at the Crowne Plaza Convention Cente, Managua, Nicaragua. She represented Nicaragua at the Miss Universe 2022 pageant and was unplaced.

Awards and achievements
Preceded by Allison Wassmer	Miss Nicaragua; 2022	Succeeded by Sheynnis Palacios
