= Miss Nicaragua 2001 =

- Date: February 3, 2001
- Presenters: Cid Largaespada & Claudia Alaniz
- Venue: Teatro Nacional Rubén Darío, Managua, Nicaragua
- Broadcaster: Televicentro
- Entrants: 12
- Winner: Ligia Argüello Roa; Managua

The Miss Nicaragua 2001 pageant, was held on February 3, 2001 in Managua, after several weeks of events. At the conclusion of the final night of competition, Ligia Cristina Argüello Roa from Managua won the title. She represented Nicaragua at Miss Universe 2001 held in Puerto Rico where she was unplaced and also Miss World 2001 held in Sun City, South Africa where she was in the Top 5 and received the Miss World Americas title. The rest of the finalists would enter different pageants.

== Placements ==
Final Results	Contestant
Miss Nicaragua 2001	Managua - Ligia Argüello Roa
Miss International Nicaragua 2001	Tipitapa - Renee Fabiola Davila
Miss Earth Nicaragua 2001	Matagalpa - Karla Leclair
Top 5	Managua - Leslie Gonzalez Rosales; Jinotega - Indra Palma

== Special awards ==
- Miss Photogenic - Matagalpa - Karla Leclair Monzón
- Miss Dorian Gray - Jinotega - Indra Palma
- Miss Congeniality - Managua- Leslie Gonzalez Rosales
- Miss Internet - Tipitapa - Renee Fabiola Davila, Managua-Leslie Gonzalez Rosales (by votes of Global Beauties Webpage)

.

== Official contestants ==
State	Contestant
Boaco	Jessie Rico Salgado
Managua	Leslie Gonzalez Rosales
Estelí	Martha Lucia Castillo Farach
Jinotega	Indra Palma Soza
Madriz	Maria Jose Villavicencio
Managua	Ligia Cristina Argüello Roa
Matagalpa	Karla Leclair Monzón
Nueva Segovia	Nancy Lafayette Fonseca
RACCN	Sherry Cunningham
Río San Juan	Valeria Guzman Romero
Rivas	Norma Gonzalez
Tipitapa	Renee Fabiola Davila

== Judges ==
- Dennis Davila - Director of Miss Nicaragua Organization
- Lucía Salvo Horvilleur - Nicaragua Minister of Health
- Roberto Courtney - Regional Director of Ethics and Transparency & (UN) Advisor
- Luisa Amalia Urcuyo - Miss Nicaragua 1993
- Oscar Miranda - Director of Sales of Televicentro
- Pierre Pierson - Nicaragua Vice-Minister of Culture
- Celia Lacayo - Nicaraguan Painter
