= Berenice Quezada =

Nicaraguan model and beauty pageant titleholder

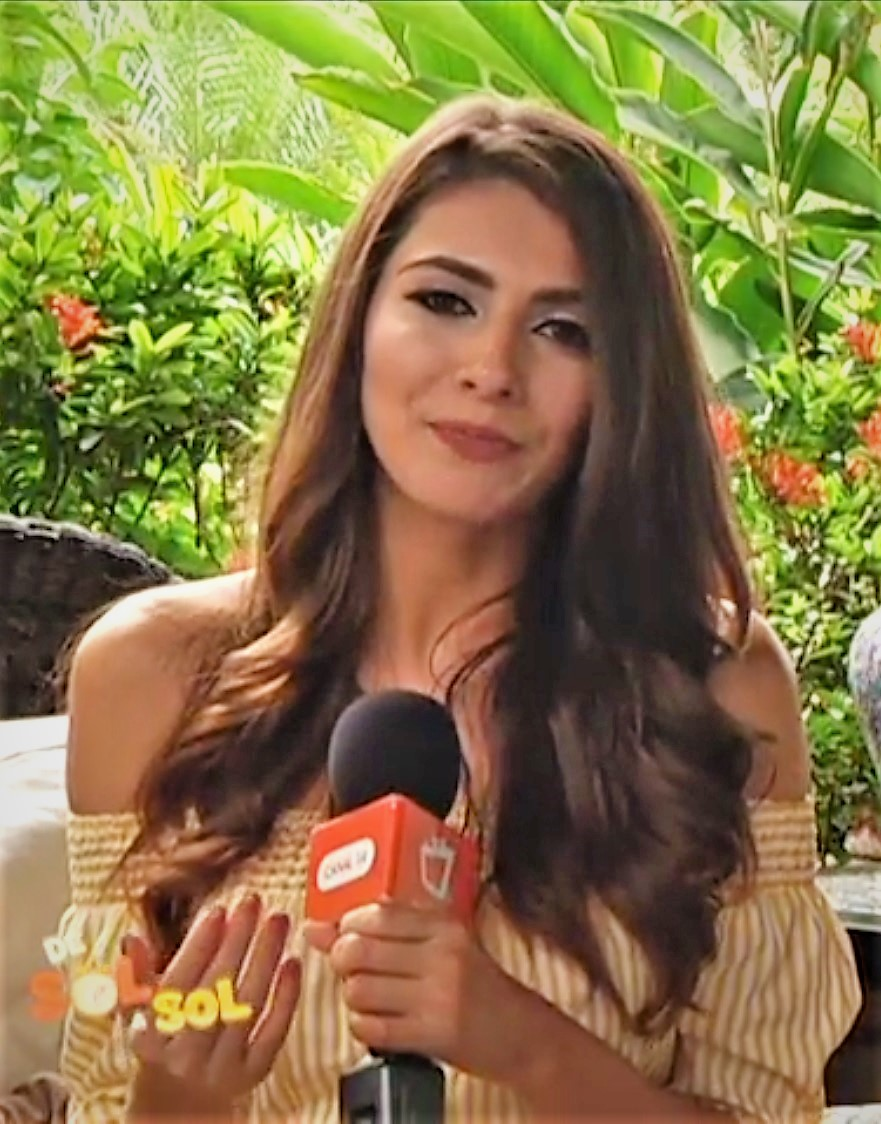
- Quezada interviewed on VOS TV in 2017
- Born: Berenice Xuyami Quezada Herrera; 28 September 1993 (age 33); Rama, Nicaragua
- Height: 1.73 m (5 ft 8 in)
- Beauty pageant titleholder
- Title: Miss Oneness 2012; Miss Nicaragua 2017
- Hair color: Brown
- Eye color: Brown
- Major competitions: Miss Model of The World 2012 (Top 7); Miss Oneness 2012 (Winner); Miss Nicaragua 2017 (Winner); Miss Universe 2017 (Unplaced)

Berenice Xuyami Quezada Herrera (born 28 September 1993) is a Nicaraguan model and beauty pageant titleholder who was crowned Miss Nicaragua 2017 and represented Nicaragua at the Miss Universe 2017 pageant.

In the 2021 Nicaraguan general election, Quezada was the running mate of Oscar Sobalvarro, presidential candidate for the Citizens for Liberty (CxL) party. However, on August 3, she was placed under house arrest and barred from running.

== Early life and education ==
Quezada was born in Rama, Nicaragua.

Quezada holds a degree in Tourism and Hotel Management.

== Miss Nicaragua 2017 ==
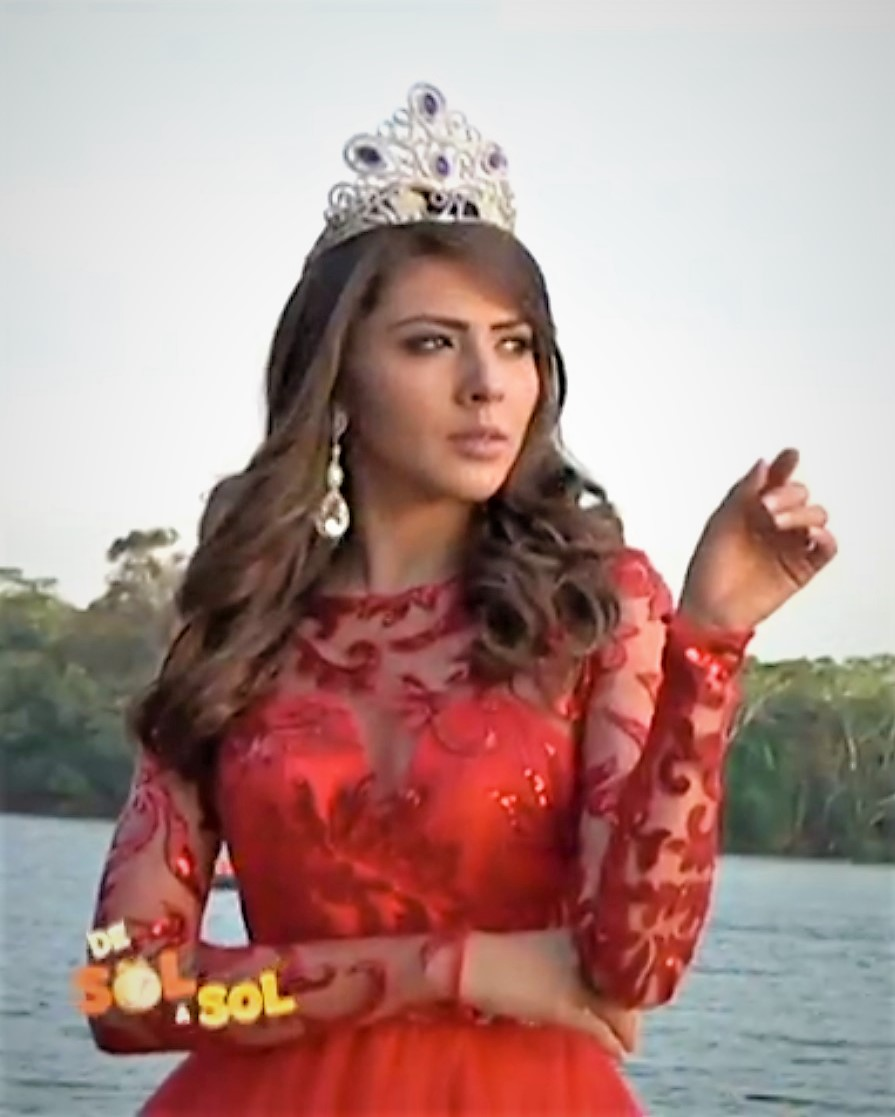
Quezada as Miss Nicaragua in 2017 photoshoot

On March 25, 2017, Quezada was crowned Miss Nicaragua 2017 by her predecessor Marina Jacoby. Quezada represented Nicaragua at Miss Universe 2017 but did not place.

== Politics ==
Following mass arrests of opposition candidates for president in the 2021 Nicaraguan general election as well as other civic leaders, and the cancellation of the legal status of other opposition parties, the Citizens for Liberty (CxL) party declared its own vice-president, former Contra commander Oscar Sobalvarro, to be its nominee for president, and Quezada was named his running mate.

Quezada was a visible participant in the 2018–2021 Nicaraguan protests; however she also modeled for Nicaragua Diseña, one of the media outlets directed by Camila Ortega, daughter of incumbent president Daniel Ortega and his wife vice-president Rosario Murillo, whom she and Sobalvarro were running against in the 2021 election. Quezada has also made social media posts about supporting their party, the Sandinista National Liberation Front.

On the night of August 3, 2021, Quezada was put under house arrest and barred from running.

Awards and achievements
Preceded by Marina Jacoby	Miss Nicaragua; 2017	Succeeded by Adriana Paniagua
