= Miss Nicaragua 2003 =

- Date: March 01, 2003
- Presenters: Gabriel Traversari
- Venue: Teatro Nacional Rubén Darío, Managua, Nicaragua
- Broadcaster: Televicentro
- Entrants: 12
- Winner: Claudia Salmerón; Tipitapa

The Miss Nicaragua 2003 pageant was held on March 1, 2003 in Managua, after several weeks of events. At the conclusion of the final night of competition, Claudia Salmerón from Tipitapa won the title. She represented Nicaragua at Miss Universe 2003 held in Panama later that year. The rest of the finalists would enter in different pageants.

== Placements ==
Final Results	Contestant
Miss Nicaragua 2003	Tipitapa - Claudia Salmerón
Miss World Nicaragua 2003	Bluefields - Hailey Britton Brooks
Miss Earth Nicaragua 2003	Managua - Marynés Argüello
Top 5	Nueva Segovia - Marisela Rodríguez; Estelí - Jamila Abdalah

== Special awards ==
- Most Beautiful Face - Tipitapa - Claudia Salmerón
- Miss Congeniality - Leon - Karen Paola Galo
- Miss Photogenic - Jinotega - Nadia Martinez
- Best Hair - Jinotega - Nadia Martinez
- Miss Internet - Managua - Marynés Argüello (by votes of Miss Nicaragua Webpage)
- Miss Global Beauties - Nueva Segovia - Marisela Rodríguez (by votes of GB Webpage)

.

== Official Contestants ==
State	Contestant
Bluefields	Hailey Britton Brooks
Boaco	Heidi Robelo
Estelí	Jamila Abdalah
Granada	Maritza Silva
Jinotega	Nadia Martinez
Leon	Karen Paola Galo
Managua	Marynés Argüello
Masaya	Myriam Zuñiga
Nueva Segovia	Marisela Rodríguez
Río San Juan	Christian Estrada
Rivas	Arlen Solórzano
Tipitapa	Claudia Salmerón

== Judges ==
- Ivania Navarro - Miss Nicaragua 1976 & Miss Teenage Intercontinental 1976
- Piero P. Coen Ubilla - Executive President of Coen Group S.A
- Ausberto Narvaez - Adivisor of National Tourism Institute
- Henrique Fontes - Director of Global Beauties Webpage
- Tiffany Roberts - Journalist
- Edwin Rosario - Fashion Designer
- Julio Castillo - CEO of Supermercados Unidos S.A
