= Ciudad Darío =

- Municipality
- Flag Coat of arms

- Location within Nicaragua
- Coordinates: 12°43′0″N 86°07′0″W
- Country: Nicaragua
- Department: Matagalpa Department

Area
  - Municipality: 735 km^{2} (284 sq mi)
- Elevation: 433 m (1,421 ft)

Population (2022 estimate)
  - Municipality: 54,063
  - Density: 73.6/km^{2} (191/sq mi)
  - Urban: 23,327
- Time zone: UTC-6 (Central (CST))
- Climate: Aw

Ciudad Darío (Spanish pronunciation: [sjuˈðað ðaˈɾi.o]) is a town and a municipality in the Matagalpa department of Nicaragua. It is the birthplace of poet Rubén Darío and the legendary guerilla leader Edén Pastora.

Previously known as Metapa and Chocoyos, Ciudad Darío is located 90 km (about 56 miles) from Managua.

== History ==
=== Precolonial ===
In prehistoric times, the area was probably part of an ancient lake, from where the Ucumulali River flowed on its way to the Pacific Ocean. Some geologists believe that over time, cataclysmic movements of the Earth created mountain ranges and diverted the river to its present course. The area was originally inhabited by Matagalpa Indians, whose main settlement was located in the vicinity of the lagoon of Moyua. It was here that archaeologists discovered pre-colonial stone columns which may have belonged to a temple.

=== Colonial ===
In the year 1528, the Spanish seem to have found some small Indian villages. The Acting Governor, Diego de Castañeda ordered captain Gabriel de Rojas to search for a passage from this location to the sea in the north. On his journey, he brought people on foot and on horses, the number of people ranging potentially from fifty to two hundred.(Indian Archives, Seville, Spain)

In 1627, Fray Garcia de Loaysa lured several Matagalpa Indians to settle in this region of Metapa. (Jaime Incer. Viajes, Rutas y Encuentros, p. 254). The town was originally known as Chocoyos, named after a small green parrot that can be seen there in great numbers, and also due to the custom of the locals to build their homes from green branches. During the Spanish colonial times the town which is along the route to the mountain towns of Matagalpa and Nueva Segovia regions, was an important resting place for missionaries and troops that were on their way to the interior of the country, . In 1685, the Bishop of Nicaragua and Costa Rica, Fray Ramon Rojas, died in Metapa (then called Chocoyos), exhausted after escaping from a pirate attack. In 1703, Chocoyos was visited by the Franciscan missionary, Fray Antonio Margil de Jesus and then by Bishop Fray Agustin Morel de Santa Cruz in 1752, when the town was renamed Metapa.

=== Post-independence ===
In 1856, Metapa was the base for the "Junta de Recursos" formed by Nicaraguan patriots to collect funds for creating the "Ejército del Septentrión" (Northern Army). This army fought against the "Filibustero" troops of the American adventurer William Walker, who had proclaimed himself President of Nicaragua. In 1857, Metapa was included in the newly formed Matagalpa Department by the government of General Tomás Martínez.

On 1867, Felix Rubén García, later known as Rubén Darío, one of the greatest poets of the Spanish language, was born in Metapa to Rosa Sarmiento. In 1883 Jorge Choiseul Praslin, widely believed to be the Duke Theobald de Choiseul Praslin, who escaped from France in 1847, died in Metapa. On February 20, 1920, Metapa changed its name to Ciudad Darío by a Decree of the Government of President Emiliano Chamorro.

In 1943, the house in which Darío was born was declared a national museum. Located near the center of the city, the building retains its original look, despite its restorations since 1999. Every January 18, his birth anniversary, people congregate at the house for poetry readings, dance performances, and other cultural activities.
