= Achuapa =

- Municipality
- Location in Nicaragua
- Coordinates: 13°03′N 86°35′W
- Country: Nicaragua
- Department: León

Area
  - Municipality: 161 sq mi (416 km^{2})

Population (2005)
  - Municipality: 13,797
  - Density: 85.9/sq mi (33.2/km^{2})
  - Urban: 2,207

San José de Achuapa (or Achuapa) is a municipality in the León department of Nicaragua.
