= Villanueva, Chinandega =

Villanueva
- Municipality
- Location in Nicaragua
- Coordinates: 12°57′49″N 86°48′53″W
- Country: Nicaragua
- Department: Chinandega

Area
  - Municipality: 300 sq mi (780 km^{2})

Population (2022 estimate)
  - Municipality: 32,271
  - Density: 110/sq mi (41/km^{2})
  - Urban: 12,421

Villanueva is a town and a municipality in the Chinandega department of Nicaragua.
