= León Department =

Department of Nicaragua

Coordinates: 12°26′N 86°53′W

León Department Departamento de León (Spanish)
- Department
- Flag Coat of arms

- Country: Nicaragua
- Capital: León

Area
  - Total: 5,138 km^{2} (1,984 sq mi)

Population (2023 estimate)
  - Total: 426,850
  - Density: 83.08/km^{2} (215.2/sq mi)
- ISO 3166-2: NI-LE

León (Spanish pronunciation: [leˈon]) is a department in Nicaragua. It covers an area of 5,138 km^{2} (1,984 sq mi) and has a population of 426,850 (2023 estimate). The capital is the city of León. There are several volcanoes in the department, including the Momotombo and Cerro Negro.

== History ==
León was established on 15 June 1524 by Francisco Hernández de Córdoba on the slopes of the Momotombo volcano. However, it was damaged by the eruption of the Momotombo volcano in 1578, and further destroyed in an earthquake in 1610. After the destruction of the city, the current settlement of León, was established about 30 km (19 mi) from the site, and León served as the capital of Nicaragua until the early 19th century. The old destroyed city became part of the Ruins of León Viejo. It also houses a cathedral, the largest in Central America, which was built between 1747 and 1860. The ruins of León Viejo was inscribed as a UNESCO World Heritage Site in 2000.

== Geography ==
León is one of the fifteen departments of Nicaragua. It is spread over an area of 5,138 km^{2} (1,984 sq mi). Its capital, León, is located 93 km (58 mi) from the national capital of Managua. It is bordered by Matagalpa, Estelí, Managua and Chinandega Departments. There are ten municipalities–Achuapa, El Jicaral, El Sauce, La Paz Centro, Larreynaga, León, Nagarote, Quezalguaque, Santa Rosa del Peñón, and Telica, in the department. The department hosts several sandy beaches along the Pacific coast. The Juan Venado Island, is located off the Pacific coast, and forms part of a protected reserve since 1983.

There are several volcanoes in the Maribios mountains. Momotombo, which raises to 1,297 m (4,255 ft) is located near the town of Puerto Momotombo, on the shores of Lake Managua. The Cerro Negro, which raises to an elevation of 728 m (2,388 ft), was formed in 1850 and is the youngest volcano in Central America. It is located close to the city of Leon and is amongst the most active volcanoes in Nicaragua.

== Demographics ==
As per 2023 estimate, Leon department had a population of 436,850 inhabitants. The population consists of 51% females and 49% males. About 64.5% of the population were classified as urban, and rest 35.5% as rural.

== Sister State ==
León is a sister state with Minnesota, USA through Project Minnesota/León.
