= Managua Department =

Department of Nicaragua

Coordinates: 12°8′N 86°15′W

Managua Departamento de Managua
- Department
- Flag Coat of arms
- Nickname: The Bride of the Xolotlan
- Country: Nicaragua
- Capital: Managua

Area
  - Total: 3,465 km^{2} (1,338 sq mi)

Population (2023 estimate)
  - Total: 1,585,800
  - Density: 457.7/km^{2} (1,185/sq mi)
- ISO 3166-2: NI-MN

Managua (Spanish pronunciation: [maˈna.ɣwa]) is a department in Nicaragua. It covers an area of 3,465 km^{2} (1,338 sq mi) and had a population of 1,585,800 (2023 estimate), making it the country's most populated department. The seat of the department is the city of Managua, the capital of Nicaragua. The department extends from Pacific Ocean to the shores of Lake Managua.

== History ==
The Nahua chiefdom of Tekwantepek was located in the region, and according to Spanish conquistador and historian Gonzalo Fernández de Oviedo y Valdés, Tekwantepek was one of the last chiefdoms in present-day Nicaragua to fall to the conquistadors and their central-Mexican allies. The chiefdom's name is a combination of the Nawat words tēkwani (jaguar), and tepek (hill), therefore Tekwantepek roughly translates to "hill of jaguars" or "jaguar hill". The name Managua itself comes the Nahuatl language word "managuac" meaning "surrounded by ponds". After the Nicaraguan independence from the Spanish in 1821, Managua became the capital of Nicaragua in 1852.

== Geography ==
Managua is one of the departments of Nicaragua. It covers an area of 3,465 km^{2} (1,338 sq mi). It is bordered by the departments of Granada, Masaya, Matagalpa, Carazo, Boaco, and León. Managua, the capital of Nicaragua, is the largest city and seat of the department. The department extends from the shores of Lake Managua to the Pacific coast through the Sierras de Managua mountains.

The department experiences a tropical climate with the mountains of Sierras de Managua experiencing a different climate. There are three natural reserves–Chiltepe Peninsula, El Chocoyero – El Brujo natural reserve and Montibelli Natural Reserve. There are two lagoons within the Chiltepe Peninsula. Being the capital, the city of Managua hosts the administrative and government buildings, in addition to the National Museum, the Rubén Darío National Theater, and the Cathedral of Santiago.

The department includes nine municipalities–Ciudad Sandino, El Crucero, Managua, Mateare, San Francisco Libre, San Rafael del Sur, Ticuantepe, Tipitapa, and Villa Carlos Fonseca

== Demographics ==
As per 2023 estimate, the department had a population of 1,585,800 inhabitants, making it the most populous department in Nicaragua.
