= Masaya Department =

Department of Nicaragua

Coordinates: 11°58′N 86°06′W

Masaya Masāyān Departamento de Masaya
- Department
- Flag Coat of arms

- Location within Nicaragua
- Country: Nicaragua
- Capital: Masaya

Area
  - Department: 611 km^{2} (236 sq mi)

Population (2021 estimate)
  - Department: 397,632
  - Density: 651/km^{2} (1,690/sq mi)
  - Urban: 238,345
- ISO 3166-2: NI-MS

Masaya (Formerly Masayan), (Spanish pronunciation: [maˈsaʝa]), (Nahuatl languages: Masāyān) is a department in Nicaragua. It is the country's smallest department by area (611 km^{2}) and has a population of 397,632 (2021 estimate). The capital is the city of Masaya. It is famous among Nicaraguan people for its nickname, "La Cuna Del Folklore" which translates to (The Cradle of Folklore). It is also the site of the Masaya Volcano, an active 635m volcano which last erupted in 2016. The Indigenous inhabitants of Masaya are the Nahuas and the Chorotegas, and was the location of the pre-Columbian Nahua chiefdom of Masatepek. The Nahuas dominate the cultivation and production of cocoa beans in the municipality of Masatepe.

== Etymology ==
The name Masaya is a combination of the Nahuat words Masat (deer), and -yan (a locative meaning habitation). Therefore the meaning of Masaya is "place where deer inhabit", which was named by the Nahuas in reference to the White-tailed deer that inhabit the region. In addition, a Nahua chiefdom called Masatepek (meaning "deer hill" in Nahuat) was located in the Masaya department. Furthermore, the Nahuas of Masatepek inhabited Nindiri, Niquinohomo, Monimbó, and Masatepe.

== Municipalities ==
1. Catarina
2. La Concepción
3. Masatepe
4. Masaya
5. Nandasmo
6. Nindirí
7. Niquinohomo
8. San Juan de Oriente
9. Tisma
