= Carlos Javier Jarquín =

Nicaraguan journalist, poet and cultural activist

- Born: June 26, 1990 (age 36); Rancho Grande; Matagalpa Department; Nicaragua
- Other names: El chico poeta Corazón de poeta
- Occupations: writer, poet, columnist, cultural journalist, music producer, cultural activist
- Notable work: Antología del Bicentenario de Centroamérica (2021); Canto planetario: hermandad en la tierra (2023)

Carlos Javier Jarquín (born 26 June 1990 in Rancho Grande, Matagalpa Department) is a Nicaraguan-born writer, poet, columnist, cultural journalist music producer, and cultural activist, currently residing in Costa Rica.

== Biography ==
Jarquín was born in a lower-income neighbourhood of the Nicaraguan town Rancho Grande. Brought up by his grandmother, he struggled to get established as a cultural journalist. Nowadays he is a columnist in several newspapers, such as Diario 16 (Madrid), Diario Siglo XXI (Valencia), La Prensa (Managua), El Siglo (Guatemala), La Onda Digital (Montevideo), among others. Through these media outlets, he has contributed to promoting the work of numerous artists and intellectuals.

During the COVID-19 pandemic he promoted the organization of a virtual event, the First International Literary Festival "Honrando la muerte y celebrando la vida" (Spanish for "Honoring Death and Celebrating Life").

In 2021, Jarquín coordinated Antología del Bicentenario de Centroamérica, celebrating two centuries of Central American independence. The book includes works by Julio Sanabria, Gilberto Arriza, Roberto de León, Rina Rodríguez and Niki Sáenz. In 2023, he coordinated the edition of Canto planetario: hermandad en la tierra, a two-volume multilingual poetry anthology advocating of a better future for the Earth and mankind. Over 200 authors took part in this work, such as Gustavo Gac-Artigas, David Eggleton, Les Wicks, Beatriz Copello, Marion May Campbell, Víctor Ramos (member of the Honduran Academy of Language), Hebert Abimorad, etc.

== Selected publications ==
- Antología del Bicentenario de Centroamérica (general coordinator). Mexico: Ayame Editorial, 2021.
- Canto planetario: hermandad en la tierra (compiler). Costa Rica: HC Editores, 2023.

== Memberships ==
- Corresponding member of the Academia Espírito-santense de Letras, Vitória, Espírito Santo, Brazil

== Awards ==
- Premio Mundial Águila de Oro 2024, awarded by the Unión Hispanomundial de Escritores (UHE)
- Premio Mundial Cesar Vallejo; Unión Hispanomundial de Escritores, 2024
