= Yvan Leyvraz =

Swiss humanitarian killed by the Sandinistas

Yvan Leyvraz (born 1954 – 28 July 1986) was a Swiss employee of Solidar Suisse and part of the international solidarity brigades in Nicaragua after the taking of power by Daniel Ortega and the Sandinistas and the ensuing Contra war. He was the second Swiss national to be killed by rebel contras in Nicaragua.

== Commitment in Nicaragua ==
Leyvraz was sent to Nicaragua as an employee of Solidar Suisse at the beginning of 1983 and was helping the work brigades there. In the summer of 1983, he led the first Swiss work brigade to rebuild a bridge in Matagalpa.

In 1984, Solidar Suisse took over responsibility for a Swiss-Nicaraguan construction work brigade. With them, he helped found several cooperatives for farmers resettled out of the war regions. As of March 1986, he was working around El Cuá-Bocay in Jinotega. In April 1985, he was managing the construction of several houses near Wiwilí. In May 1986, three of his Nicaraguan technicians were murdered by a group of Contras. Another of the first projects of the brigade was the Yale cooperative, attacked by contras on 31 May 1986.

In the morning of 28 July 1986, Leyvraz was the driver of one of two pickups leaving Wiwilí. At Zompopera—a region at the headwater of Río Coco between Wiwilí and the city of Jinotega—the pickups were ambushed by the contras and Leyvraz' truck was hit by an anti-tank grenade launcher, which killed him and four companions. After Maurice Demierre, who was murdered in February 1986, he became the second Swiss national killed in the international solidarity movement in Nicaragua. In 2016, a number of Leyvras' former colleagues went back to Nicaragua to commemorate the 30th anniversary of his death. The twentieth anniversary had been similarly memorialized.

== Reactions ==
The Federal Department of Foreign Affairs expressed its regrets over the death of Leyvraz but did not officially protest to the United States. A secretary of state even declared that he was cowed by the Americans into admitting that the murdered Swiss men were "left-wing people".

As a political consequence of the deaths of Leyvraz and Demierre, Switzerland banned some regions of Nicaragua from receiving project support from the Swiss federal government. This reaction also affected a Swiss auxiliary.

=== Books ===
- Jacques Depallens, Nicaragua 1986: l'aventure internationaliste de Maurice, Yvan, Joel et Berndt (Centre Europe-Tiers Monde) Geneva 1996, ISBN 978-2880530235

=== Movies ===
- Olivia Heussler, Der Tod von Yvan Leyvraz (The Death of Yvan Leyvraz). Swiss-German TV production, Nicaragua, 1986
- Kristina Konrad, Unser America (Our America). Documentary, Germany/Switzerland, 2006. - Part of the movie refers to Leyvraz.

== Music ==
The Bern-based chanteur Michel Bühler dedicated Chanson Pour Yvan Leyvraz (Song for Yvan Leyvraz) on his 2007 album "Jusqu'à Quand?" (Until When?) to Leyvraz.

== See also ==
- List of unsolved murders (1980–1999)
