= Peperomia versicolor =

Scientific classification
- Kingdom: Plantae
- Clade: Embryophytes
- Clade: Tracheophytes
- Clade: Angiosperms
- Clade: Magnoliids
- Order: Piperales
- Family: Piperaceae
- Genus: Peperomia
- Species: P. versicolor

Binomial name
- Peperomia versicolor Trel.

Synonyms
- Peperomia niveopunctulata Trel. Peperomia pilulifera Trel.

Species of plant

Peperomia versicolor is a species of epiphyte or lithophyte from the genus Peperomia. It grows in wet tropical biomes. It was discovered by William Trelease and published the species in the book "Contributions from the United States National Herbarium 26(4): 200. 1929". First-ever specimens were founded in Costa Rica and 1926. Versicolor means particolored or changes its color.

== Distribution ==
Peperomia versicolor is native from Nicaragua to Ecuador. Specimens can be collected at an elevation of 780–2,000 meters (2,560–6,560 ft).

- Costa Rica
  - Cartago
    - Reventazón River
  - Alajuela
    - San Carlos
      - Fortuna
    - San Ramón
      - Angeles
    - Upala
      - Aguas Claras
  - Limón
    - Siquirres
      - Florida
  - Puntarenas
    - Golfito
      - Jiménez
  - San José
    - Pérez Zeledón
      - Rivas
- Colombia
  - Antioquia
    - Sopetrán
    - Jardín
    - Frontino
    - Urrao
    - Envigado
    - Campamento
    - Amalfi
  - Valle del Cauca
    - Yotoco
    - Restrepo
  - Santander
    - Encino
  - Nariño
    - Barbacoas
      - Altaquer
  - Risaralda
    - Pereira
  - Meta
    - La Macarena
- Panama
  - Coclé
  - Chiriquí
- Ecuador
  - Manabi
    - Flavio Alfaro
  - Zamora-Chinchipe
  - Napo
  - Carchi
  - Pichincha
- Nicaragua
  - Granada
  - Estelí
  - Jinotega
    - Bocay
  - Río San Juan
  - Matagalpa
  - Atlántico Norte
- Belize
  - Toledo

Peperomia niveo-punctulata

- Costa Rica
  - Limón

Peperomia pilulifera

- Costa Rica
  - Limón

== Description ==
It is a small stoloniferous-erect glabrous epiphytic herb. Its stem is 2 millimeters thick with short internodes. Leaves alternate, they are lance-shaped and acute at both ends. It is 5-nerved, thin-leathered, opaque, and purple-red beneath. Its petioles are 3 millimeters long. It has terminal spikes and axillary and a peduncle that is 5 millimeters long, leaves are round-peltate.

== Subtaxa ==
The following are recognized as synonyms.

- Peperomia niveopunctulata Trel.
- Peperomia pilulifera Trel.
