= Tuma-La Dalia =

El Tuma-La Dalia
- Municipality
- Location in Nicaragua
- Coordinates: 13°08′N 85°44′W
- Country: Nicaragua
- Department: Matagalpa

Area
  - Municipality: 252 sq mi (652 km^{2})

Population (2022 estimate)
  - Municipality: 79,740
  - Density: 317/sq mi (122/km^{2})
  - Urban: 13,472

Tuma-La Dalia is a municipality in the Matagalpa Department of Nicaragua. The municipal seat is the town of La Dalia. The municipality takes its name from its two main towns: El Tuma and La Dalia. It is located 175 kilometers from the capital, Managua, and 45 kilometers from the city of Matagalpa, the departmental capital of the same name.

== Geography ==
The municipal area is bordered to the north by the municipalities of Jinotega and El Cuá, to the south by the municipalities of Matiguás and San Ramón, to the east by the municipality of Rancho Grande, and to the west by the municipality of Matagalpa. The region is predominantly characterized by rugged and mountainous terrain with remnants of pine and cloud forests due to the elevations of the Darien and Isabelia mountain ranges. It has a small amount of flat land, followed by fewer hills, indicating a variety of land types. It is estimated that 40% of the terrain is flat and 60% is rugged.

== History ==
The municipality dates back to the early 1920s when a budding road connected the town of "El Tuma" with the city of Matagalpa. At that time, the town consisted of a scattered hamlet. With the introduction of coffee cultivation, the population concentration in the territory increased, many families from Matagalpa migrated to the town, starting coffee plantations which flourished around that time. In the 1960s, several families settled in the emerging town of "La Dalia," which was a crossroads between Wasaka and the "La Dalia" estate. With the country's political administrative division, approved on August 17, 1989, it was elevated to a municipality, named El Tuma - La Dalia.

== Demographics ==
El Tuma - La Dalia has a current population of 79,740 inhabitants. Of the total population, 49.8% are men and 50.2% are women. Nearly 16.9% of the population lives in the urban area.

== Nature and Climate ==
The municipality has a subtropical forest climate, semi-humid, corresponding to the semi-wet tropical climate, with precipitation between 2000 and 2500 mm. The temperature ranges from 22 to 24 °C.

The degree of soil slopes ranges from strongly undulating, moderately steep, steep, very steep, mountainous to cliff, that is, from 8% to more than 75% slope. Forest production use predominates with 62%, followed by forest protection use with 17%, and agroforestry use with 14%, while agricultural and agro-industrial use only cover 6% of the municipality's surface area.

== Localities ==
The urban center is divided into three neighborhoods; whereas, the rural area has 26 districts: Peñas Blancas, Bijao Arriba, Bull Bull Arriba, Bull Bull Abajo, Wasaka Arriba, Wasaka Abajo, El Pavón, El Castillo, La Tronca, Yale, El Granadillo, El Coyolar, El Tigre, Piedra Luna, Aguas Amarillas, Quililito, Quililon, El Guapotal, Yayule, Yasica Norte y Cuatro Esquinas, Wassaka Central, Wassaka Southeast.

== Economy ==
The main economic activity of Tuma-La Dalia is agriculture, particularly in coffee. Its major attractions are:

- San Martín Hydroelectric Plant
- Tuma River
- "El Edén" Waterfall
- Agroecological coffee farms where one can observe the primary processes for coffee cultivation.
