= Esquipulas, Nicaragua =

Esquipulas
- Municipality
- Location in Nicaragua
- Coordinates: 12°40′N 85°47′W
- Country: Nicaragua
- Department: Matagalpa

Area
  - Municipality: 85 sq mi (219 km^{2})

Population (2005)
  - Municipality: 15,877
  - Density: 188/sq mi (72.5/km^{2})
  - Urban: 5,474
- Climate: Aw

Esquipulas is a municipality in the Matagalpa department of Nicaragua.

== Geography ==
To the north, Esquipulas borders the municipalities of San Dionisio and Matagalpa, and to the south Boaco and San José de los Remates.

=== Climate ===
The municipality enjoys mild temperatures with a rainy season from May - December and a dry season between January and April.

Climate data for Esquipulas, Nicaragua (1971–1990)
| Month | Jan | Feb | Mar | Apr | May | Jun | Jul | Aug | Sep | Oct | Nov | Dec | Year |
|---|---|---|---|---|---|---|---|---|---|---|---|---|---|
| Mean daily maximum °C (°F) | 26.2 (79.2) | 27.7 (81.9) | 29.8 (85.6) | 30.8 (87.4) | 30.9 (87.6) | 28.3 (82.9) | 27.0 (80.6) | 27.6 (81.7) | 27.9 (82.2) | 27.8 (82.0) | 27.1 (80.8) | 26.1 (79.0) | 28.1 (82.6) |
| Daily mean °C (°F) | 22.6 (72.7) | 24.5 (76.1) | 24.9 (76.8) | 25.8 (78.4) | 26.3 (79.3) | 24.9 (76.8) | 23.9 (75.0) | 24.2 (75.6) | 24.2 (75.6) | 24.2 (75.6) | 23.8 (74.8) | 23.1 (73.6) | 24.4 (75.9) |
| Mean daily minimum °C (°F) | 19.0 (66.2) | 19.3 (66.7) | 19.9 (67.8) | 20.7 (69.3) | 21.7 (71.1) | 21.4 (70.5) | 20.7 (69.3) | 20.8 (69.4) | 20.5 (68.9) | 20.5 (68.9) | 20.4 (68.7) | 20.0 (68.0) | 20.4 (68.7) |
| Average precipitation mm (inches) | 25 (1.0) | 13 (0.5) | 8 (0.3) | 17 (0.7) | 153 (6.0) | 210 (8.3) | 143 (5.6) | 160 (6.3) | 185 (7.3) | 182 (7.2) | 69 (2.7) | 32 (1.3) | 1,197 (47.1) |
| Average precipitation days (≥ 1 mm) | 5 | 3 | 1 | 3 | 8 | 16 | 18 | 18 | 17 | 16 | 10 | 9 | 124 |
Source: National Oceanic and Atmospheric Administration
