= Culture Monks =

Indian creative enterprise

Culture Monks is a creative enterprise based in Kolkata, India, working since 2012. They are engaged in cultural activism, capacity building of the creative sector, production, training, research and development. Its areas of work includes theatre, storytelling, performance art, visual arts and film making. It is also involved in using art intervention to transform communities towards social development.

Culture Monks has started a theatre training program for children which is called Young Monks.
