= Petrona Hernández López =

Nicaraguan revolutionary

- Born: Maria de la Cruz; 3 May 1890 or 6 may 1890? El Carmen, La Dalia, Matagalpa
- Died: 14 February 2007 (aged 116 years, 287 days); El Carmen
- Other name: Amanda Aguilar
- Occupation: Revolutionary

Petrona Hernández López (3 May 1890 or 6 may 1890? - 14 February 2007), born Maria de la Cruz, better known as Amanda Aguilar, was a revolutionary from Nicaragua. She was a member of the Sandinista National Liberation Front (FSLN) and participated in the struggle against the Somocista dynasty from the 1930s until 1979. She was also a supercentenarian whose age was not confirmed by either the Gerontology Research Group and LongeviQuest, but was confirmed by Centenarian – Oldest People. If her age was correct, she would have been the oldest person on earth from 27 August 2006 after the death of Maria Esther de Capovilla until her own death on 14 February 2007. Her reported age was 116 years 287 days.

== Biography ==
=== Early life ===
Hernández was born as Maria de la Cruz in rural Nicaragua. She was reportedly born on 3 May 1890. Her family lived in poverty.

Both Hernández and her mother, María Hernandez Venancia, collaborated with Sandino against the occupation by US Marines.

Hernández adopted the name Amanda Aguilar as a revolutionary and then later adopted the name Petrona Hernández López for her own protection.

=== Membership in the FSLN (1920-1979) ===
Hernández and her family supported Augusto César Sandino during the 1920s to oppose the United States occupation.

She was an active member of the Sandinista National Liberation Front (FSLN) from the 1930s until 1979, fighting for Nicaraguan independence against the Somocista dynasty.

By 1961, her whole family had joined the FSLN. During the conflict, she lost two children and two brothers, Juan and Esteban Hernández, to the Somoza regime. Her brothers died when they were thrown from an aeroplane.

=== Membership in Las Mujeres del Cuá (1960s) ===
During the 1960s, many women from the municipality of El Cuá organised themselves to support the guerrillas. In the 1960s, Hernández became a member of the group that later became known as Las Mujeres del Cuá (lit. 'Women of Cuá'). The group was composed of women from El Cuá who supported guerrilla operations.

In 1968, the area was attacked by the Somocista National Guard. The men were killed, and the women were imprisoned. Following the 1968 attack, Hernández was imprisoned, tortured, and raped. Hernández's mother, María Venancia was also taken into captivity.

The National Guard sought information about guerrilla activity. However, the women refused to collaborate. As a result, nineteen of the women were raped and tortured.

After six months of imprisonment, rape and torture, the women were released. These nineteen women became known as the Women of Cua. Other members included Gladys Baez, Gloria Martinez, Doris Tijerino. Hernández was the oldest member of the group and their leader. Hernández's mother, María Venancia, died during captivity.

Upon her release, Hernández gave public testimony regarding the group's treatment. Hernández's testimony brought to light the systemic nature of the repression carried out by the National Guard. The accounts provided by survivors, like Hernández, provided documented evidence of the conditions faced by those labelled as political prisoners.

=== Death ===
Hernández died on 14 February 2007 at the claimed age of 116 years and 287 days. After her death, the president at the time, Daniel Ortega, paid tribute to her.

She was buried in El Carmen, Rancho Grande, at the church of the Assemblies of God.

== Recognition and legacy ==
Hernández’s account of the events at El Cuá and testimony, along with that of other women in the group, became the subject of the song "Las Mujeres del Cuá," written by Carlos Mejía Godoy. The song served as a form of canto testimonial (testimonial song), a genre used to document experiences of state repression and broadcast them to a broader audience during the conflict.

Las Mujeres del Cuá, were commemorated in poems, including by Ernesto Cardenal. The members were also described in both his 1974 poem "Las campesinas del Cua" and within the 1999 publication of "Cantiga 16" from his work Cántico cósmico.

The Order of Augusto Cesar Sandino was posthumously awarded to her in 2017.

In 2019 The Women Militants of the FSLN “Amanda Aguilar” were established as a campaign group for gender equality. The group was named after Lopez's revolutionary alias.

== Personal life ==
She had three children, two of whom were killed by the dictatorship.
