= El Cuá =

El Cuá El Cuá
- Municipality
- El Cuá
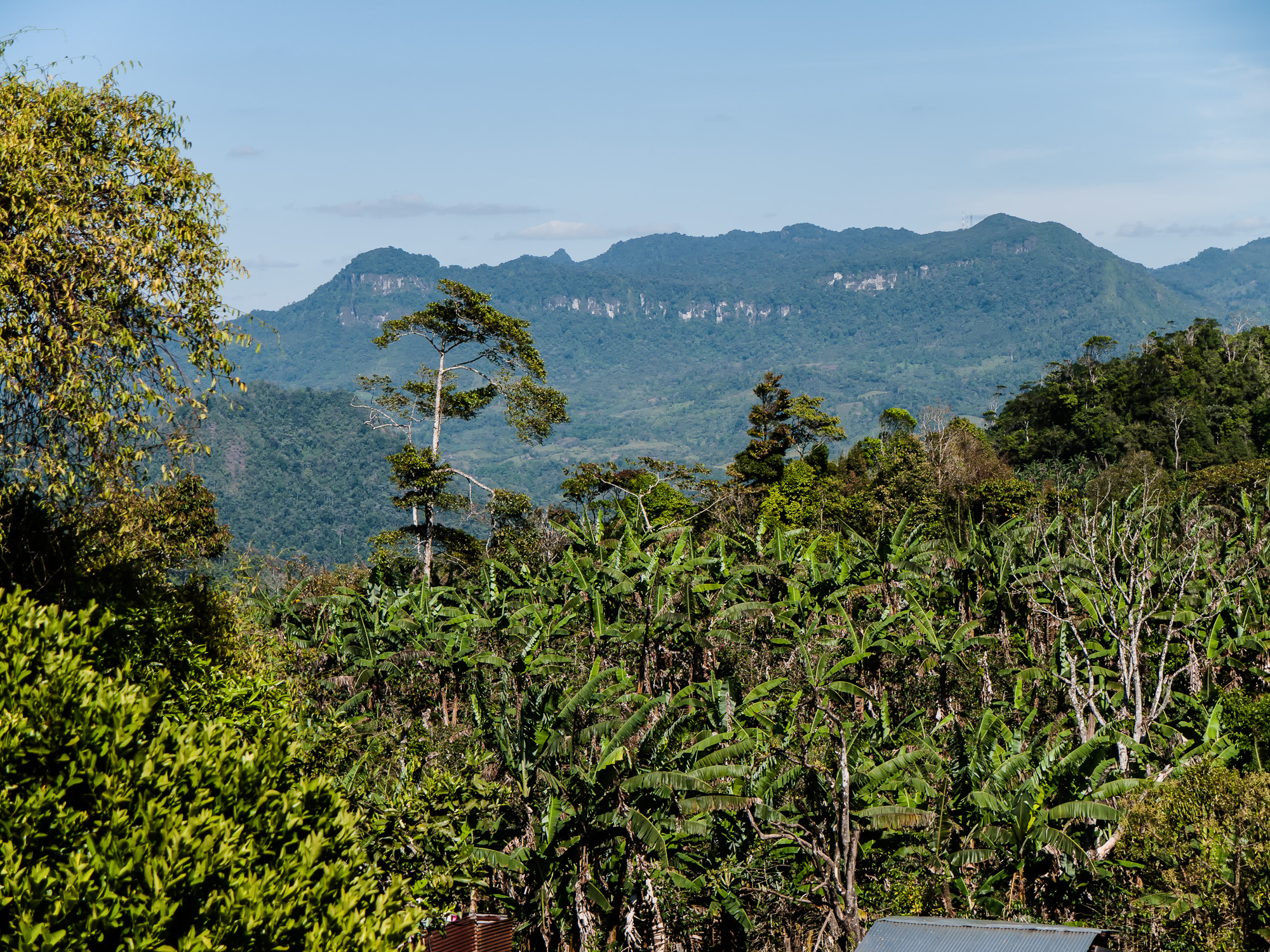
- Bosawás nature reserve
- Interactive map of El Cuá
- Location of El Cuá in Nicaragua
- Coordinates: 13°22′3″N 85°40′24″W
- Country: Nicaragua
- Department: Jinotega
- Established: 2002 (separated from El Cuá-Bocay)

Government
  - Type: Local government
  - Mayor: Dr. Raúl Lara Acevedo

Area
  - Municipality: 246 sq mi (637 km^{2})

Population (2022 estimate)
  - Municipality: 61,689
  - Density: 251/sq mi (96.8/km^{2})
  - Urban: 11,280
- Time zone: UTC-6 (Central: UTC-6)
  - Summer (DST): Central: UTC-6
- Postal code: 66500
- Population estimate from National Institute of Development Information, Nicaragua 2022

El Cuá (Spanish pronunciation: [el 'kwa]) is a municipality in the Jinotega department of Nicaragua.

== Geography ==
El Cuá is mountainous. Much of it is covered with vegetation. The altitude is highly variable, ranging from 300 meters above sea level at the Coco River up to 1,745 meters above sea level in the Peñas Blancas massif and Kilambé hill. Many rivers continue flowing throughout the year, making the area ideal for the generation of hydroelectric power. Fish and crustaceans are a part of the local diet. The main rivers in the area include the Cua, Gusanera, Bocay, and Lakus rivers and the Coco or Segovia river in its upper basin, marking the border between Nicaragua and Honduras.

== Climate ==
The area has a tropical climate, with temperatures ranging between 24º and 25 °C and abundant rainfall between 1,600 and 2,000 mm per year. The wet season lasts approximately eight months and the remainder of the year is the dry season.

== Localities ==
Formerly part of the municipality of El Cuá-Bocay, it became a separate municipality in 2002. Its population rose from 43,305 in 2005 to 56,897 in 2012.

The municipality is divided into three different areas based on physical characteristics, the South, Central, and North Zones. El Cuá is part of the South Zone and is made up of 11 comarcas and 74 communities.

El Cuá borders the municipalities of Wiwilí de Nueva Segovia and San José de Bocay to the north, El Tuma-La Dalia and Rancho Grande to the south, Waslala and Siuna to the east, and Santa María de Pantasma and Jinotega to the west.

== History ==
The name El Cuá originates from the Sumo Mayangna language, combining the terms "Kuah," meaning turtle, and "Huas," meaning river or stream. The phrase is interpreted as meaning "River with turtles" or "Place of waters with turtles." Historically, the territory was considered a sacred space by indigenous peoples, who performed ceremonies within the Peñas Blancas Massif. The indigenous population of the area were the Caribiés, later known as the Chontales.

Until 1897, El Cuá was the administrative seat of the Bocay District. When the Bocay district was annexed to the department of Jinotega, the municipal territory was unpopulated, although the area contained substantial natural resources. The territory of Cua-Bocay was part of the municipality of Jinotega until 1989, when the municipality of Cua-Bocay was created due to the Law of Administrative Political Division issued by the National Assembly.

El Cuá municipality was a logistical hub for the Sandinistas during the Nicaraguan Revolution and the ensuing Contra War of the 1980s.

The mountainous terrain of Jinotega provided strategic cover for Sandinista National Liberation Front military operations and regional defense lines. The area is associated with Las Mujeres del Cuá, who participated in the Nicaraguan revolution. During the 1970s, the National Guard established regional command posts in El Cuá, San José de Bocay, and Bocaycito to conduct military operations against guerrilla groups. According to contemporary reports, these operations involved the systemic imprisonment, torture, and forced displacement of local farmers suspected of supporting the insurgency. The Guard also compelled residents to clear land for an unused airstrip and destroyed civilian homes and agricultural fields to dismantle the insurgents' local support networks.

In the 1980s, the deployment of international workers facilitated the repair of local infrastructure, including a hydroelectric plant. American engineer Ben Linder who was killed during the Contra war was part of a team that worked on a hydroelectric plant which gave power to El Cuá and neighboring San José de Bocay.

== Culture ==
The municipality of El Cuá observes the San Isidro Festival on May 15 in honour of the patron saint of farmers, featuring religious activities and community gatherings. Patron saint festivities dedicated to Our Lady of Mercy take place on September 24, incorporating masses, processions, fairs, horse parades, floats, and band performances.

Culinary traditions centre on local agricultural ingredients such as corn, tubers, and coffee. Traditional products include local root vegetables and fruits such as yucca, malanga, banana, and pijibay, are accompanied by baked goods like perrerreque, corn cake, doughnuts, and coconut bread. Typical local foods include chicken in broth, spotted rooster, nacatamales, tortillas and güirilas with curd and cream, and beef, tripe, or meatball soups. Traditional drinks include coffee, pinolillo, warm corn beverages, pozol, chicha bruja, cocoa, and natural fruit drinks.

The architecture in El Cuá combines vernacular elements with modern structures, featuring public and recreational spaces that support community life. Key structures include the Our Lady of Mercy Parish Church, rebuilt in 2014, alongside a municipal park, a sports court, a stadium, and a local market.

== Attractions ==
There is archaeological evidence of ancient indigenous settlements at the Siete Piedras Historical Center located in Yaoska. Both the Peñas Blancas Massif Nature Reserve and the Los Nogales Reserve have nature trails. Sites of interest in El Cuá include the Rainbow Waterfall, the El Caño hot springs, and agricultural properties such as the Don Chico Agrotourism Farm. The area also has a nature centre which supports environmental education and regional conservation efforts.

== Economy ==
Agriculture is the principal economic sector. There are approximately 4,000 landowners, mainly small producers with farms smaller than 20 Manzanas (a Manzana in Nicaragua is equivalent to 1.74 acres).
