= Caraphia lingafelteri =

Scientific classification
- Domain: Eukaryota
- Kingdom: Animalia
- Phylum: Arthropoda
- Class: Insecta
- Order: Coleoptera
- Suborder: Polyphaga
- Infraorder: Cucujiformia
- Family: Cerambycidae
- Genus: Caraphia
- Species: C. lingafelteri

Binomial name
- Caraphia lingafelteri (Ohbayashi & Yamasako, 2016)

Species of beetle

Caraphia lingafelteri is a species of beetle in the family Cerambycidae. It was described by Ohbayashi and Yamasako in 2016. It is found in Matagalpa Department in Nicaragua.
