= Otto de la Rocha =

Nicaraguan musician (1933–2020)

- Born: Otto Benjamín de la Rocha López; 23 August 1933; Jinotega, Nicaragua
- Died: 25 May 2020 (aged 86) Managua, Nicaragua
- Occupations: Singer; composer; radio actor
- Instruments: Vocals; guitar
- Years active: 1948–2019

Otto Benjamín de la Rocha López (23 August 1933 – 25 May 2020) was a Nicaraguan singer, songwriter and radio actor, best known for his characterization of the picaresque persona Aniceto Prieto.

== Biography ==
Otto de la Rocha was born to Benjamín de la Rocha and Graciela López in Jinotega, Nicaragua, on 23 August 1933. Although he never studied music, he inherited his love of music from his maternal grandfather, Juan Fajardo, who was related to the brothers Carlos and Luis Enrique Mejía Godoy.

He was married three times and fathered 10 children. He worked alongside his third wife, radio actress Georgina Valdivia, appearing together in radio plays and television commercials.

== Early life ==
At 13 years of age de la Rocha travelled to the capital Managua in search of a radio station where he would be able to perform- even though at the time it was extremely difficult to break into the then newly available radio broadcasting.

According to de la Rocha in 1948 he began to find fame via the broadcast of "Voz de la Victoria" (The Voice of Victory) on an amateur talent program hosted by the well known baccalaureate Oscar Pérez Valdivia, after he began to listen to the music of Nicaraguan greats such as Camilo Zapata.

== Pancho Madrigal ==
It was thanks to this trio that de la Rocha was able to create one of the characters that would bring him nationwide fame. After the three performed on a live radio program hosted by radio entrepreneur Fabio Gadea Mantilla, he was asked to read a script in the style of a peasant farmer- thus "Pancho Madrigal" was born. The program, also called Pancho Madrigal, was broadcast on Radio Mundial (Worldwide Radio), replacing the character Tío Popo played by Rodolfo Arana Sándigo who, due to health issues, was unable to continue performing.

The program was subsequently transferred to Radio Corporación where de la Rocha continued to work for 20 years. De la Rocha continued creating much loved characters, the most well known of which include Aniceto Prieto (an annoying native, according to de la Rocha), Indio Filomeno (the protagonist of another radio program which is also broadcast on television), Filito, as well as La Chepona, Mustafá the Turk and Policarpio Matute among others.

The character of Aniceto Prieto is much loved in Nicaragua, according to de la Rocha.

"the name can be translated into many languages: 'Anice Price' in English, 'Anicetof Pietrovich' in Parluski, 'Aniceté Petrua' in Fransua, 'Anicetini Pietronini' in Italianini and Aniceto Prieto in Chapiollo."

Due to his work on the program "El Indio Filomeno" de la Rocha was sued on three occasions by the then head of National Guard radio and television Colonel Alberto Luna Solórzano.

De la Rocha maintained that the program did not express the names of figures from the then present era of repressive politics in Nicaragua.

"...but I would say 'Sodom and Gomorra, get the point Somoza', so colonel Luna Solórzano would call me before he would sue me to say 'Don't think that we're stupid, because we know perfectly well who you're talking about and we know you're badmouthing the Guard."

He recalls that at Radio Corporación he, along with Carlos Mejía Godoy, ran a program called "Corporito" and

"...it was there he (Luna Solórzano) finally got me, but since Carlos owned the program he got stuck with the first fine in 1965."

The fine was for 10,000 córdobas ($1,428 USD at the time), which the populace helped to fund out of affection for the characters and actors.

== Radio production ==
After the triumph of the Sandinista Revolution in 1979, de la Rocha created a program called "El tronco de los mensajeros" (The Messenger's Trunk) at the recently opened "Radio Sandino", as well as an agricultural program for farmers.

In 1982 he transferred to radio broadcasting station "Voz de Nicaragua" (Voice of Nicaragua) with the programs "La Palomita Mensajera" (The Messenger Bird) and "Lencho Catarrán". In 1990 he and his programs moved to Radio Ya.

In "Lencho Catarrán", his current wife plays the role of "Lupita", whom his character Aniceto Prieto is constantly trying to seduce. He and Lupita together appear in various television commercials.

In his musical career, de la Rocha has composed at least 100 songs, although he hasn't recorded them all. His repertoire comprises only around 30 tracks. They include: "Una Canción", "La Pelo’e Mais", "Managua, linda Managua", "A Mi Mama", "Primera Dama", "Plutarco Malpaisillo", "Soledad", "El Peón", "Pancho Madrigal", "Lencho Catarrán" and "Amor Florecido", among others.

Some of his tracks have gained international recognition. His track "Una Canción" from the album of the same name was covered by Cuban singer Elsa Baeza in 1978 which gained her a golden disc in Spain; however, de la Rocha did not receive any recognition as the composer.

De la Rocha lived in Managua where he continued his work in music and radio.

== List of radio programs ==
- Lencho Catarrán (currently on air)
- La Palomita Mensajera (currently on air)
- El Tronco De Los Mensajeros
- La Guantanamera
- Corporito
- Juan Chocoyo y Mincho Colorado
- Tu Canto Pinolero
- El Indio Filomeno (including television appearances)
- Pancho Madrigal

== List of top tracks ==
- Una Canción
- La Pelo’e Mais
- Managua, linda Managua
- Diluvio De Amor
- Plutarco Malpaisillo
- A Mi Mama
- Primera Dama
- Soledad
- Brumas
- El Peón
- Amor Florecido
- En Tú Cumpleaños
- La Canción del Marinero
- La Hojita
- Mancotal
- La Pipiridonga
- Una Tarde De Primavera
- Ay, Mi Mujercita
- El Pichelito De Agua
- La Petrona
- El Pitero
- Pañuelito
- Lencho Catarrán (program theme song)
- Pancho Madrigal (program theme song)

== Acknowledgements ==
- Rubén Darío Cultural Order from the Mayor of Managua
- Salvador Cardenal Cultural order from the Mayor of Managua
- Declared "Beloved Son of Managua" in 2008 for his contribution to culture, history and education of the citizens of Managua by the Mayor of Managua.
- Dedicator of the Ninth Inter-university Festival
- Acknowledged in 2004 for his artistic work and contribution to the national culture by the directors of the Rubén Darío National Theatre.
