= Las Mujeres del Cuá =

Group of revolutionary women from Nicaragua

The Women of El Cuá
- Las Mujeres del Cuá
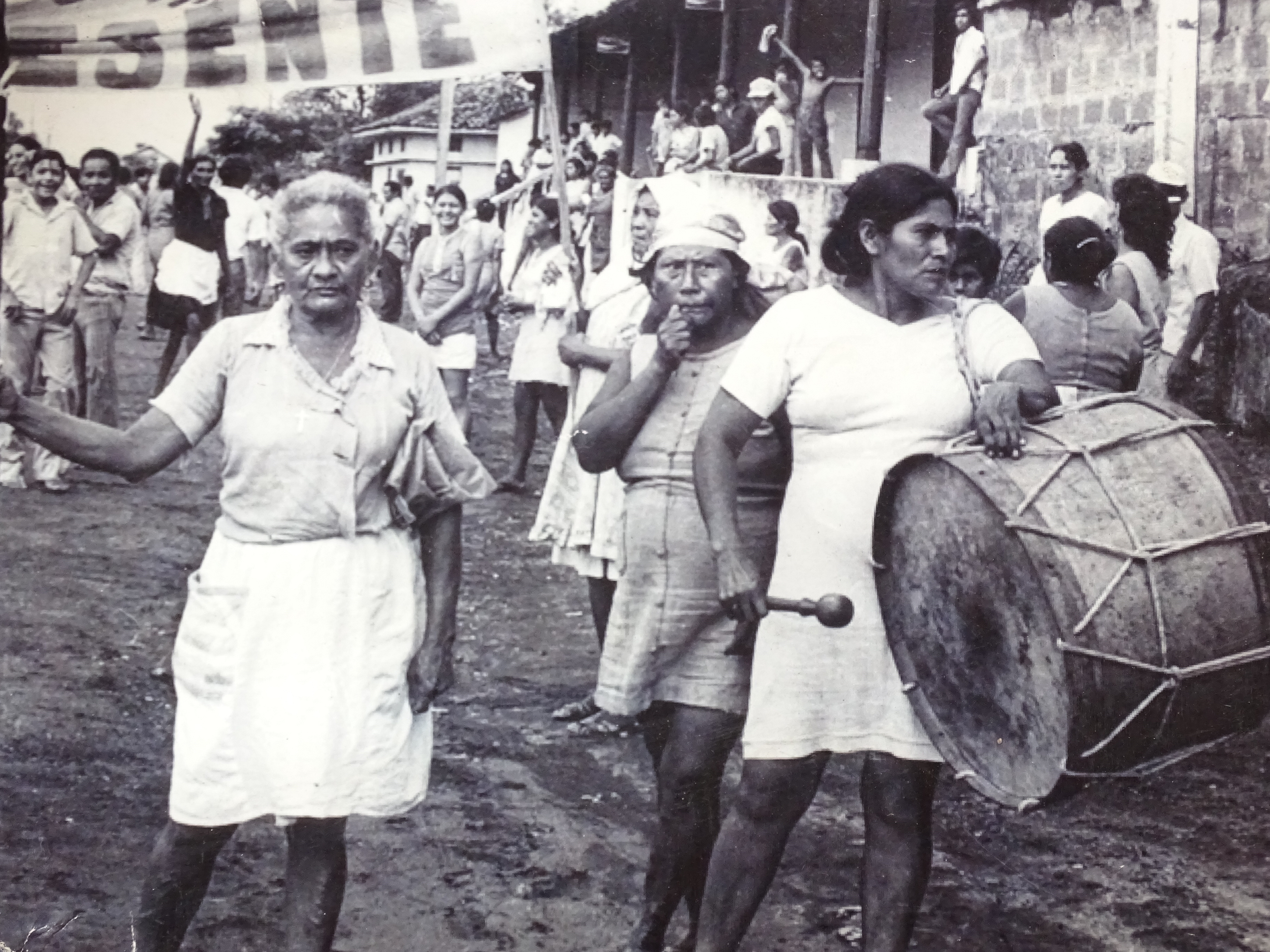
- Women participating in the revolution (1970)
- Established: 1960s
- Headquarters: El Cuá, Nicaragua
- Leader: Petrona Hernández López

Las Mujeres del Cuá (lit. 'Women of El Cuá') were a group of Nicaraguan peasant women from El Cuá who were Sandinoists supporting Augusto Sandino against the dictatorship of Anastasio Somoza Debayle in the 1960s and 1970s. They were affiliated with the guerrillas of the Sandinista National Liberation Front (FSLN). Many were eventually imprisoned and subjected to torture, rape, and murder at the barracks of the National Guard.

== Overview ==
The Women of El Cuá were a group of Nicaraguan peasant women who opposed the Somoza regime. Benigna Mendiola, a Sandinista guerrilla who became a deputy, commented:

Sin las Mujeres del Cuá no se puede hablar de la guerrilla. Ellas fueron un baluarte de las columnas guerrilleras, les pasaban información, servían de correo, los escondían, les hacían la comida, arriesgaban su vida por los "muchachos" de entonces.

Without the Women of El Cuá, one cannot speak of the guerrilla. They were a bastion for the guerrilla columns; they passed information, acted as couriers, hid them, cooked for them, and risked their lives for our "boys."

During the Nicaraguan Revolution, many women joined groups similar to Las Mujeres del Cuá. Many of the women who joined were peasants. In doing so, they often challenged traditional domestic roles as mothers and caregivers. Many women joined guerrilla units in 1967. Women who joined groups affiliated with the FSLN were often involved in opposing political repression directed at women and youth under the Somoza regime. Within the FSLN, female members participated in combat roles alongside their male counterparts. Somewhat more progressive views on gender equality emerged due to the need to grow their numbers and strengthen the movement. Women often also supported logistics and provided protection and shelter.

The women of the group came from the communities of El Carmen, Cuskawás, El Bijao, and La Tronca. None of them were native to the municipality of El Cuá.

== Capture ==
In 1968, the National Guard, the armed branch of the Somoza government, carried out a campaign of repression and intelligence gathering in the community. The guard destroyed the town. Many of the inhabitants fled to a camp held by the guerrillas in the mountains of Zinica, in Matagalpa. After being discovered by government forces, the camp was attacked. Although many inhabitants managed to flee, some were detained in Santa María de Tasuá, in El Cuá, and taken to the nearby military facilities. Among those arrested were 19 peasant women.

Those taken prisoner included Matilde Hernández, María Venancia Aguilar (from El Carmen), Luz Amanda Aguilar (from El Carmen, Rancho Grande), Natividad de Jesús Martínez Sánchez (from Cuskawás), Benigna Mendiola (from La Tronca), Petrona Hernández, and Marling Hernández.

The women refused to provide information about the activities or the location of Bernardino Díaz Ochoa, a member of the National Directorate. The prisoners were tortured. Some also disappeared. After the interrogations, Esteban Hernández and Juan Hernández were dropped from the air over El Chachagón hill and were never found.

Hostilities between FSLN and the Somoza regime ended with the guerrillas entering the mountains and proceeding to Managua, on 19 July 1979. Community members of Jinotega in El Cuá provided shelter to members of the FSLN. They also formed a type of intelligence service, assisting with logistical tasks such as relaying messages, managing supplies, and hiding guerrillas.

== Members ==
Two lead members of the group were Petrona Hernández López and Natividad Martínez Sánchez. Hernández was born María de la Cruz and was known by her pseudonym Amanda Aguilar. She was a cook for General Sandino in his struggle in the 1930s against the United States occupation of the country. She lived in the district of El Carmen, Rancho Grande, in Matagalpa. Angelina Díaz, Hernández's daughter-in-law, her son, Jacinto Hernández, and her mother, María Venancia, also were guerillas. Her mother María Venancia died in captivity with the group. Her son Jacinto Hernández was killed in 1975.

Natividad Martínez Sánchez was known as "Conchita". She was the daughter of the union leader Máximo Martínez Salgado "Policarpo", patriarch of Cuskawás, and was the wife of Matías Granados Guillén "Reynaldo", who fell fighting the Somoza Battalion of the National Guard on 4 October 1974, in Cuskawás. She had six children, the eldest being Víctor Hugo Granados Martínez "Carlito Matías", who joined the ranks of the Sandinista National Liberation Front in the same year his father fell. In 1974, she was interrogated and tortured for a second time, in the Church of San Antonio de Cuskawás, which the National Guard had converted into a prison.

Other members included Cándida María González Donaire, Martina González Hernández, Aurelia Hernández, Facunda Catalina González, Marling Hernández, María González Hernández, Luz Marina Hernández, Apolonia González Romero, Esperanza Hernández García, Maclovia Sánchez Pérez, Vicenta de López, Marcelina Aguilar Rodríguez, Aura Esthela Martínez, Juana Docea Aguilar Rodríguez, Isaiz Mendoza, as well as Pedro and Estheban Jiménez.

It was common for very young women and children to join the movement.Younger members who joined the group were Cándida Martínez, Víctor Hugo Granados Martínez (7 years old), Justo Pastor Guillén Martínez (10 years old), Rufino Aguilar (12 years old), and Camilo Aguilar Rodríguez (14 years old).

== Legacy ==
The women inspired works by Nicaraguan cultural and political figures. Poet Ernesto Cardenal wrote about them in his 1974 poem "Las campesinas del Cuá" and later in "Cantiga 16" in his 1999 publication Cántico cósmico. Cardenal's poetry later inspired Carlos Mejía Godoy to write the song about them.

I am going to tell you, comrades, about the women of El Cuá, who came down from the hills on the General's orders. About María Venancia and Amanda Aguilar, two daughters of the mountain who refused to speak...

Alberto Monzón Fornos, a correspondent for La Prensa in Matagalpa, reported on what happened to the women. He commented that:

Hay que tener muchos pantalones para decir con nombres y apellidos los nombres de los campesinos que fueron montados a un avión y ya jamás volvieron.

You have to have a lot of guts to say the names...peasants who were loaded onto a plane and never returned.

== See also ==
- Nicaraguan revolution
- Sandinista National Liberation Front
