= San Isidro, Nicaragua =

San Isidro
- Municipality
- Location in Nicaragua
- Coordinates: 12°56′N 86°12′W
- Country: Nicaragua
- Department: Matagalpa

Area
  - Municipality: 109 sq mi (283 km^{2})

Population (2005)
  - Municipality: 17,412
  - Density: 159/sq mi (61.5/km^{2})
  - Urban: 8,015
- Climate: Aw

San Isidro (Spanish pronunciation: [san iˈsiðɾo]) is a municipality in the Matagalpa department of Nicaragua.

== Climate ==
Climate data for San Isidro, Nicaragua
Month	Jan	Feb	Mar	Apr	May	Jun	Jul	Aug	Sep	Oct	Nov	Dec	Year
Mean daily maximum °C (°F)	30.2 (86.4)	31.1 (88.0)	32.6 (90.7)	33.5 (92.3)	32.7 (90.9)	30.8 (87.4)	28.6 (83.5)	31.3 (88.3)	30.7 (87.3)	30.1 (86.2)	30.0 (86.0)	30.0 (86.0)	31.0 (87.8)
Daily mean °C (°F)	24.6 (76.3)	24.9 (76.8)	28.1 (82.6)	26.9 (80.4)	26.9 (80.4)	26.1 (79.0)	26.0 (78.8)	26.1 (79.0)	25.4 (77.7)	24.1 (75.4)	24.7 (76.5)	24.8 (76.6)	25.7 (78.3)
Mean daily minimum °C (°F)	19.1 (66.4)	18.6 (65.5)	19.5 (67.1)	19.4 (66.9)	21.2 (70.2)	21.2 (70.2)	20.8 (69.4)	20.9 (69.6)	20.3 (68.5)	19.9 (67.8)	19.5 (67.1)	19.4 (66.9)	20.0 (68.0)
Average precipitation mm (inches)	2 (0.1)	1 (0.0)	5 (0.2)	22 (0.9)	125 (4.9)	160 (6.3)	71 (2.8)	102 (4.0)	176 (6.9)	150 (5.9)	42 (1.7)	6 (0.2)	863 (34.0)
Average precipitation days (≥ 1.0 mm)	1	0	1	2	8	13	9	11	14	14	5	2	79
Source: National Oceanic and Atmospheric Administration (temperatures 1961–1987, precipitation 1961–1990)
