= Caraphia =

Scientific classification
- Kingdom: Animalia
- Phylum: Arthropoda
- Class: Insecta
- Order: Coleoptera
- Suborder: Polyphaga
- Infraorder: Cucujiformia
- Family: Cerambycidae
- Subfamily: Lepturinae
- Tribe: Caraphiini; Ohbayashi, Lin & Yamasako, 2016
- Genus: Caraphia; Matsushita, 1933

Genus of beetles

Caraphia is a genus of longhorned beetles in the family Cerambycidae, found in Central America.

The species Caraphia seriata and Caraphia squamosa formerly made up the genus Noctileptura, which was determined to be a taxonomic synonym of the genus Caraphia.

== Species ==
These species are members of the genus Caraphia:

- Caraphia lingafelteri Ohbayashi & Yamasako, 2016 - Honduras, El Salvador, Nicaragua (Matagalpa)
- Caraphia seriata (Chemsak & Linsley, 1984) - Southern Mexico, Guatemala
- Caraphia squamosa (Chemsak & Linsley, 1984) - Southern Mexico
- Caraphia warneri Wappes & Santos-Silva, 2018 - Guatemala
- Caraphia woodruffi Wappes & Santos-Silva, 2018 - Guatemala, Honduras
