= Hebert Abimorad =

Uruguayan writer

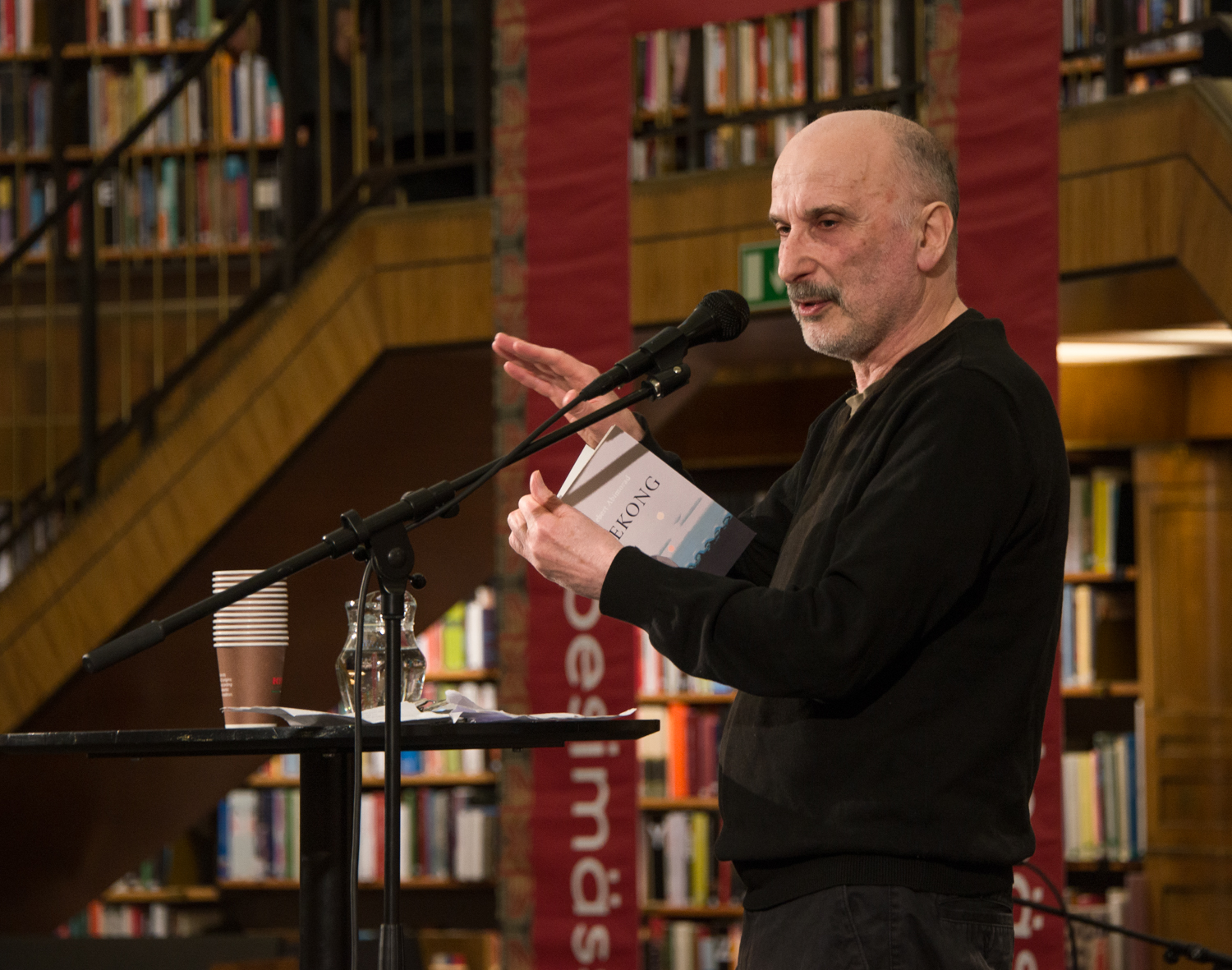
Hebert Abimorad during a poetry event in the Stockholm Public Library (2018).

Hebert Abimorad (born 1946 in Montevideo) is a Uruguayan-born journalist, translator and poet.

Abimorad went into exile to Sweden due to the civic-military dictatorship in Uruguay. He settled in Gothenburg and developed a journalist career, writing for Göteborgs-Posten and Arbetet. He also wrote poetry and translated Swedish works into Spanish.

== Works ==
His works are:

In Spanish

- Gotemburgo, amor y destino (bilingual, 1982)
- Gestos distantes (bilingual, 1985)
- Voces ecos (bilingual, 1988)
- Poemas Frugálicos (1994)
- Poemas frugálicos 2 (1995)
- Malena y Cíber (Ediciones Trilce, Montevideo, 1996; under the heteronym Martina Martínez)
- Poemas Frugálicos 3 (Ediciones Trilce, Montevideo, 1998, compilation of previous writings)
- Conversaciones y Volverá la loba... (Ediciones Trilce, Montevideo, 2000, under the heteronyms José José and Camilo Alegre)
- Nuevos poemas frugálicos y otros textos heterónimos- Antología 1982-2007 (Baile del sol, Spain, 2008)
- Hermatario (Botella al mar, 2011, Montevideo, under the heteronym Silvestre del Bosque)
- Invento ad Gotemburgum (La Torre degli Arabeschi, Italy, 2001)
- Mekong (Aedas, Montevideo, 2012, illustrations by Sandra Petrovich)
- dios (Yaugurú, Montevideo, 2013, under the heteronym Flor de Condominio)
- 100 poemas frugálicos (Ediciones Oblicuas, Spain, 2014)
- Poemas y dibujos frugálicos (Yaugurú, Montevideo, 2015)
- La Plaza ( Vitruvio, Madrid, 2018)
- Profecías frugálicas ( Vitruvio, Madrid, 2020)
- Frugálicas variaciones estacionales ( Madrid 2022)
- En la plaza 33, 33 días, 33 minutos, 33 poemas frugálicos ( Montevideo, Yaugurú, 2023 )
- El perro tuerto ( Buenos Aires, 2026)

In English

- Frugal poems ( Amazon, 2023, translation by Karen Hoflin)
- Canto planetario: hermandad en la Tierra. Volumen I (various authors, ed. Carlos Javier Jarquín). Antology. Costa Rica: H.C. Editores, 2023.

In Swedish

- Korta dikter (Heterogénesis, 2000, translation by Lena E. Heyman)
- Samtal (Libertad, Suecia, 2006, translation by Lena E. Heyman)
- Mekong ( Styx, Suecia, 2018, translation by Maria Nääs)
- Torget ( Styx, Suecia, translation by Siri Hultén, 2020 )
- Frugaliska profetior (translation by Siri Hulté, 2024)
- På torg 33, 33 dagar, 33 minuter, 33 frugaliska dikter (2025, translation by Siri Hultén )

In French

- Poémes frugaux-Poemas frugálicos (Fondation littéraire Fleur de Lys, Canada, 2010, translation by Marie-C Seguin)

In Italian

- Nuove poesie frugali ed altri testi eteronimi ( Liberaij, Edizione privata, 2017, translation by Karen Hofling, Italia)

Translations

- Barn kammare (The Children's Room) for Atelier teater, Gothemburg (1984)
- Poesía sueca contemporánea (Baile del sol, Spain, 2011)
- Edith Södergran, Karin Boye, un encuentro entre dos poetas suecas ( Ediciones oblicuas, 2017, Spain)
- "Un encuentro con tres poetas suecas, Edith Södergran, Karin Boye, Agnes von Krusenstjerna (Editorial Yaugurú, Montevideo)
