= Marion May Campbell =

Australian novelist and academic

- Born: Sydney, New South Wales
- Occupations: novelist and academic

Marion May Campbell (born 1948) is a contemporary Australian novelist and an academician.

== Biography ==
Marion May Campbell was born in Sydney, New South Wales, 1948. Campbell earned a BA in French Literature studying first at the University of New South Wales and completing her degree at the University of Western Australia. She then pursued her post-graduate study at Aix en Provence, writing a dissertation on the work of Stéphane Mallarmé and completed a PhD in Literary Studies and Creative Writing at Victoria University in 2011.

Campbell's novels explore professional and personal relationships between women and literary theoretical concerns, often in a non-standard 'experimental' writing style. In addition to novels, her work includes short fiction, poetry, and essays and reviews for journals. For the stage, Campbell has written the musical theatre piece Dr. Memory in the Dream Home which was first performed in 1990 and an adaption of Not Being Miriam entitled Ariadne's Understudies in 1991.

In 2013, Campbell was appointed Associate Professor of Professional and Creative Writing at Deakin University. Campbell has previously coordinated the creative writing program at the University of Melbourne.

== Awards ==
- Shortlisted twice for the Canada-Australia Prize
- 1989 – winner of the Western Australian Premier's Book Awards for Not Being Miriam
- 1999 – shortlisted for the Western Australian Premier's Book Awards for Prowler
- 2006 – shortlisted for the Western Australian Premier's Book Awards for Shadow Thief

== Selected works ==
=== Novels ===
- Campbell, Marion May (1985). Lines of flight : a novel. Fremantle, WA: Fremantle Arts Centre Press.
- — (1988). Not being Miriam. Fremantle, WA: Fremantle Arts Centre Press.
- Prowler (Fremantle Arts Centre, 1999) ISBN 1-86368-251-1
- Shadow Thief (Pandanus, 2006) ISBN 1-74076-189-8
- Konkretion (University of Western Australia Press, 2013)

=== Performance writing ===
- Dr Memory in the Dream Home (PICA, 1990)
- Ariadne's Understudies (PICA, 1992)
- The Half-Life of Creonite (not yet performed)

=== Poetry ===
- Languish (Upswell, 2022)
- Various authors (2023). Jarquín, Carlos Javier (ed.). Canto planetario: hermandad en la Tierra. Costa Rica: HC Editores. ISBN 979-8850092115.

=== Memoir ===
- The Man on the Mantlepiece (University of Western Australia Press, 2018)
