= Caraphia seriata =

Scientific classification
- Kingdom: Animalia
- Phylum: Arthropoda
- Class: Insecta
- Order: Coleoptera
- Suborder: Polyphaga
- Infraorder: Cucujiformia
- Family: Cerambycidae
- Genus: Caraphia
- Species: C. seriata

Binomial name
- Caraphia seriata (Chemsak & Linsley, 1984)

Synonyms
- Noctileptura seriata Chemsak & Linsley, 1984

Species of beetle

Caraphia seriata is a species of beetle in the family Cerambycidae. It was described by Chemsak and Linsley in 1984. It is found in Honduras and Guatemala.
