= San Dionisio, Nicaragua =

San Dionisio
- Municipality
- Location in Nicaragua
- Coordinates: 12°45′N 85°51′W
- Country: Nicaragua
- Department: Matagalpa

Area
  - Municipality: 166 km^{2} (64 sq mi)

Population (2005)
  - Municipality: 17,742
  - Density: 107/km^{2} (277/sq mi)
  - Urban: 2,576
- Climate: Aw

San Dionisio is a small municipality in the Matagalpa department of Nicaragua.

Originally named Espino Blanco, the town was renamed San Dionisio in honor of Dionisio de Herrera, former President of Nicaragua. This small town is 140 kilometres (90 mi) away from Managua, the capital of Nicaragua, and 50 km (30 mi) away from Matagalpa city, the capital of the Matagalpa Department.

== Population ==
People from this town are informally known as "nichanos". San Dionisio is dominated by mestizos, but there are significant native populations in two sections of the municipality, wibuse and Portillo del Jicaro.

== Comarcas ==
The municipality is divided into the comarcas (villages): El Corozo, El Carrizal, Las Cuchillas, El Ocote, Monte Verde, Piedra Larga, Los Limones, Wibuse, El Tempisque, and El Portillo del Jicaro.

== Economy and services ==
Production is mainly devoted to coffee beans, beans, corn, livestock, and vegetables. Education is available through the secondary level. There is currently a medical center, and a hospital too.

The Rio Calico runs through the town from north-west to south-east. The Matagalpa River is in the south-east. Buses runs all day from Matagalpa and Esquipulas.

== Sports ==
Baseball is the major sport. There are many baseball players from this town playing for the Nicaragua team or major Nicaraguan baseball league.

== Religion ==
The town is predominantly Catholic, but evangelical churches are springing up everywhere. There is a Catholic festivity on October 9 to honor Pope Dionysius (San Dionisio).

Like many small towns in Nicaragua, the residents do not receive much support from central government, only getting attention during Political campaigns. For this reason, change is slow.
