= Gustavo Gac-Artigas =

Chilean writer

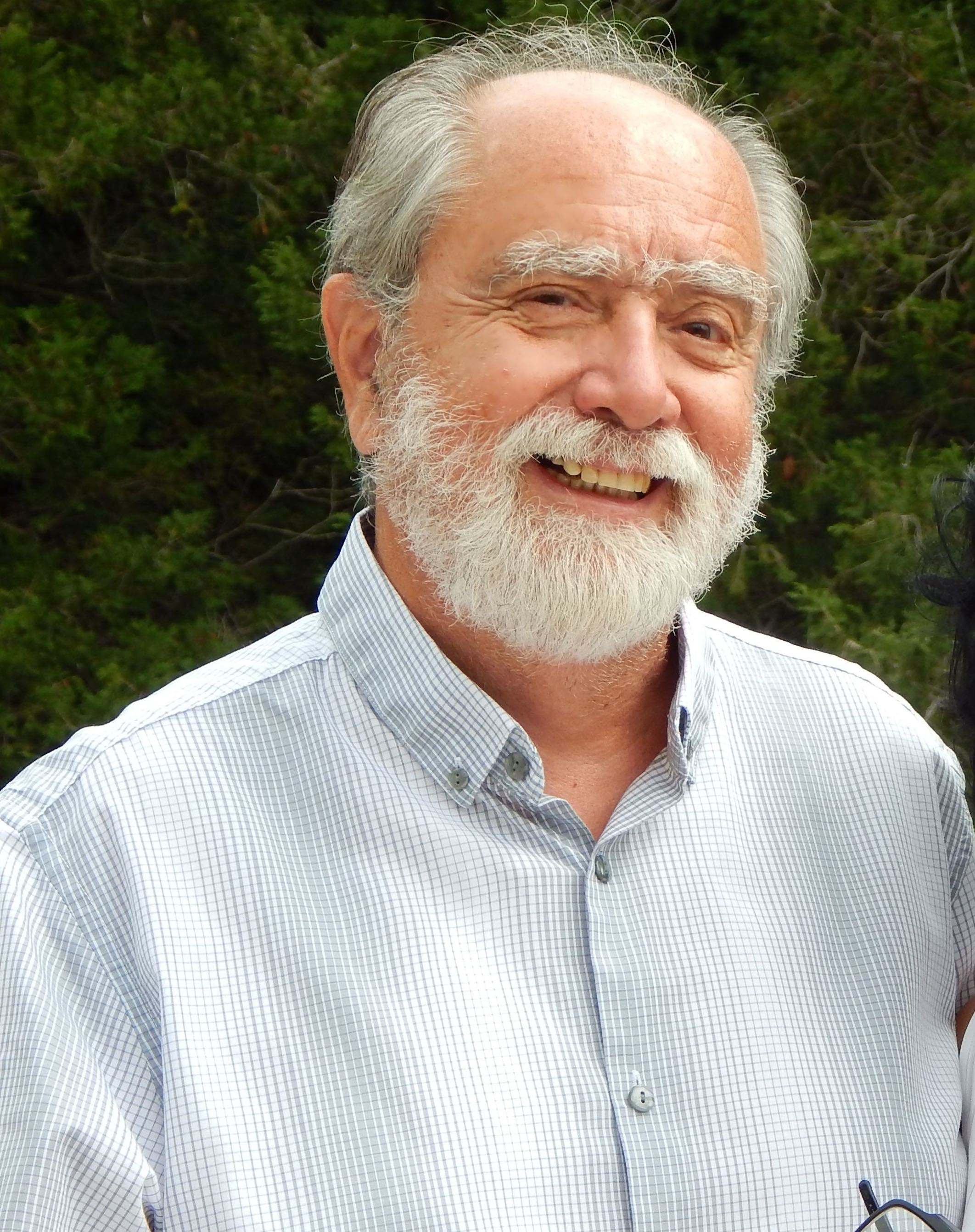
- Born: 1944 (age 81–82)
- Occupation: Writer
- Spouse: Priscilla Gac-Artigas

Gustavo Gac-Artigas (born 1944) is a Chilean American writer: poet, playwright, actor, theater director, and editor. Born in Santiago, Chile, he has lived in New Jersey since 1995. He is a correspondent member of the North American Academy of the Spanish Language (Academia Norteamericana de Lengua Espanola-ANLE), a correspondent member of the Academia Hispanoamericana de Buenas Letras de Madrid, and a member of PEN-Chile and PEN America. He is also member of the Sociedad de Escritoras y Escritores de Chile (SECH).

His poetry has been partially translated into English, French, Romanian, Arabic, Italian, Korean, and Malayalam, and published in academic literary magazines such as the Revista de la Academia Norteamericana de la Lengua Española, the Latino Book Review, Multicultural Echoes Literary Magazine (California State University in Chico), Enclave, Revista de Creación Literaria en Español (the City University of New York-CUNY), and in cultural magazines such as ViceVersa, Letralia, Todoliteratura, The Chesterton Review, Nueva York Poetry Review, Hybrido, Cronopios, Cículo de Poesía, Revista Esteros, Piedra del Sol, Kametsa, Nagari and Terre a Ciel., Letras de Chile

It has also been included in anthologies such as Segunda antología poética de la Feria Internacional del Libro de Nueva York, 2022, Antología poetica LACUHE 2022, Boundless 2022: Anthology of the Valle del Rio Grande International Poetry Festival y Multilingual Anthology (The Americas Poetry Festival of New York 2019, 2021, 2022, 2023).

He has written op-eds for Agencia Efe, Le Monde diplomatique, Edición Chile, Impactolatino.com, since 2015.

== Art Without Borders-The Gac-Artigas Foundation ==
With his wife Priscilla Gac-Artigas, professor of Latin American literature at Monmouth University, NJ, he is the owner and curator of the exhibit Memories, Geography of a Decade: Chile 1973-1983. The exhibit consists of 45 original prints (24 of them numbered); 25 posters; 50 pictures of the 1973 coup; and 25 photos of performances by Théâtre de la Résistance-Chili, a Chilean theater group in exile in Paris after the coup. Prints are by three National Art Award winners: José Balmes, Guillermo Núñez, & Gracia Barrios, and by Alejandro Marcos, Ernest Pignon-Ernest, and Eduardo Berroeta; posters, which retrace a decade of cultural solidarity events in Europe, by artists e.g. Miró & Ottaviano; photos of the coup are by former Gamma news agency journalists; and TRCh theater pictures are professional photos showing the evolution of a theater group forced to create in exile. Memorias has been hosted by the University of Pennsylvania, Instituto Cervantes in NY, Bowdoin College, and Monmouth University, in NJ.

== Biography ==
In 1968 Gac-Artigas travelled to Bulgaria to participate in the Democratic Youth World Festival and to Czechoslovakia invited by the government of the time to observe the changes introduced during the Prague Spring. Upon his return to Chile, he dropped out of college and embarked on a trip through Latin America performing in different countries with a documentary theater play called Poetry Mail. This included poems by established writers, local writers and songs interspersed with current events from national and local newspapers. With Poetry Mail, Gac-Artigas traversed South America from his native Chile to Bogotá, Colombia. In Colombia he worked with Enrique Buenaventura and Santiago Garcia and the Teatro La Candelaria in Bogotá.

In 1971 he returned to Chile where he founded and directed the experimental Theatre del Cobre (TEC) in the Cultural House of El Teniente copper mine during the government of Salvador Allende.

TEC's last performance in Chile was at the Chuquicamata mine, in the northern part of the country with the play Freedom, Freedom, an adaptation by Gac-Artigas of Flavio Rengel’s play about a group opposed to the 1973 coup d'état. The presentation began on September 10, 1973 and ended with a forum attended by David Baytelman, manager of the mine, mine workers, and some political leaders on 11 September, the day in which the group was supposed to continue their tour to present the play for the workers of the nitrate mine.

Gac-Artigas was apprehended on September 11 and subsequently transferred to Rancagua, located 2,000 kilometers to the south, after three days. There, he was incarcerated as political prisoner number 3245 - as recorded by the Chilean National Institute of Human Rights. Over a period of three days, he underwent "expedited interrogation", a euphemism used by the military for torture, conducted by a Lieutenant Medina.

He was released from jail months later, and taken to Santiago where, with a deportation order and a travel document issued by the Red Cross, he left the country for exile in Paris. There, along with Colombian actress Perla Valencia, he founded the group Théâtre de la Résistance-Chili (then Nuevo Teatro Los Comediantes), with which he toured Europe and participated in international festivals such as: Nancy, Avignon, Ljubljana, Hammamet, Djendouba, Tabarka, Hammam Lift, Yverdon, Bern, Zurich and Stagedoor Festival among others.

In 1984 he tried to return to Chile, but on September the 5th of that year his name appeared on a list of about 5,000 people forbidden from entering the country for representing "a danger to the internal security of the State". This unsuccessful endeavor led him and his group to traverse Latin America, journeying from Buenos Aires to Bogotá and passing through Bolivia, Peru, and Ecuador. They spent a year in Colombia, performing throughout various regions. After engaging in a hunger strike, Gac-Artigas was sent back to Europe – Rotterdam this time, rather than Paris, as he had lost his political refugee status in France due to a year-long absence.

From 1986 to 1990, he lived in the Netherlands, persisting in his theatrical endeavors. During this period, his group took part in the Stagedoor Festival in 1986 and the Latino Festival of Utrecht in 1989. In 1989 he received the Dunya Poëzieprijs Poetry International and Rotterdamse Kunststichting Poetry Park Award for his story Dr. Zamenhofstraat.

In 2018 his novel Y todos éramos actores, un siglo de luz y sombra (And All of Us Were Actors, A Century Of Light And Shadow) (2016), English edition translated by Andrea G. Labinger was second runner up for the ILBA (International Latino Book Award 2018) in the category of Best Fiction Book in Translation - Spanish to English. In 2025, this novel was the Winner of the American Lagacy Award for Cross-Gendre novel.

Gac-Artigas moved to New Jersey in 1995 and lives there to this day where he continues to write.

== Poetry ==
2026 Mientras vivo mi olvido / While Living My Oblivion. Prologue: Juan Carlos Mestre, trans. by Priscilla Gac-Artigas. Broken Bowl Books, NY.

2026 Corolario / Corollary. Prólogo: Reynaldo Lacámara, trans. by Priscilla Gac-Artigas, Hebel Ediciones, Colección Antípodas, Chile.

2026 Al filo de los días / On the Edge of Days. Prologue: Luis Cruz-Villalobos, trans. by Andrea G. Labinger and Priscilla Gac-Artigas. Santa Rabia Poetry Colección de Poesía Panhispánica, Perú.

2025 Las cadenas de sor Juana / Sor Juana’s Fetters / Les chaînes de sor Juana. Hebel Ediciones, Colección Andes, Chile, trans. by Andrea G. Labinger, Nicole Laurent-Catrice and Priscilla Gac-Artigas..

2024 Si lo hubiera sabido…Valparaíso Ediciones, Granada.

2024 Confieso que escribo / I Confess that I Write. Hebel & Cross-Cultural Communications, Chile/USA, traducido por Andrea G. Labinger y Priscilla Gac-Artigas.

2024 POŞTA POEZIEI/El correo de la poesía. Rumania. Editorial Kult, traducido por Carmen Bulzan.

2023 Un poète dans la ville / Un poeta en la ciudad. Paris, Éditions l’Harmattan, traducido por Priscilla Gac-Artigas.

2024 Invocación de confines/Invocarea limitei. Chile, Independently Poetry, traducido por Carmen Bulzan.

2023 Desde el fondo del tintero: Dalibá, la brujita del Caribe (París 1982) y Exiliadas (Róterdam 1988). HLCCNY.

2022 hombre de américa/man of the americas. Nueva York Poetry Press, NY, traducido por Andrea G. Labinger y Priscilla Gac-Artigas.

2020 deseos/longings/j’aimerais tant. Ediciones Nuevo Espacio, EE. UU., 2020. traducción al inglés: Andrea G. Labinger, al francés: Priscilla Gac-Artigas.

=== Novels ===
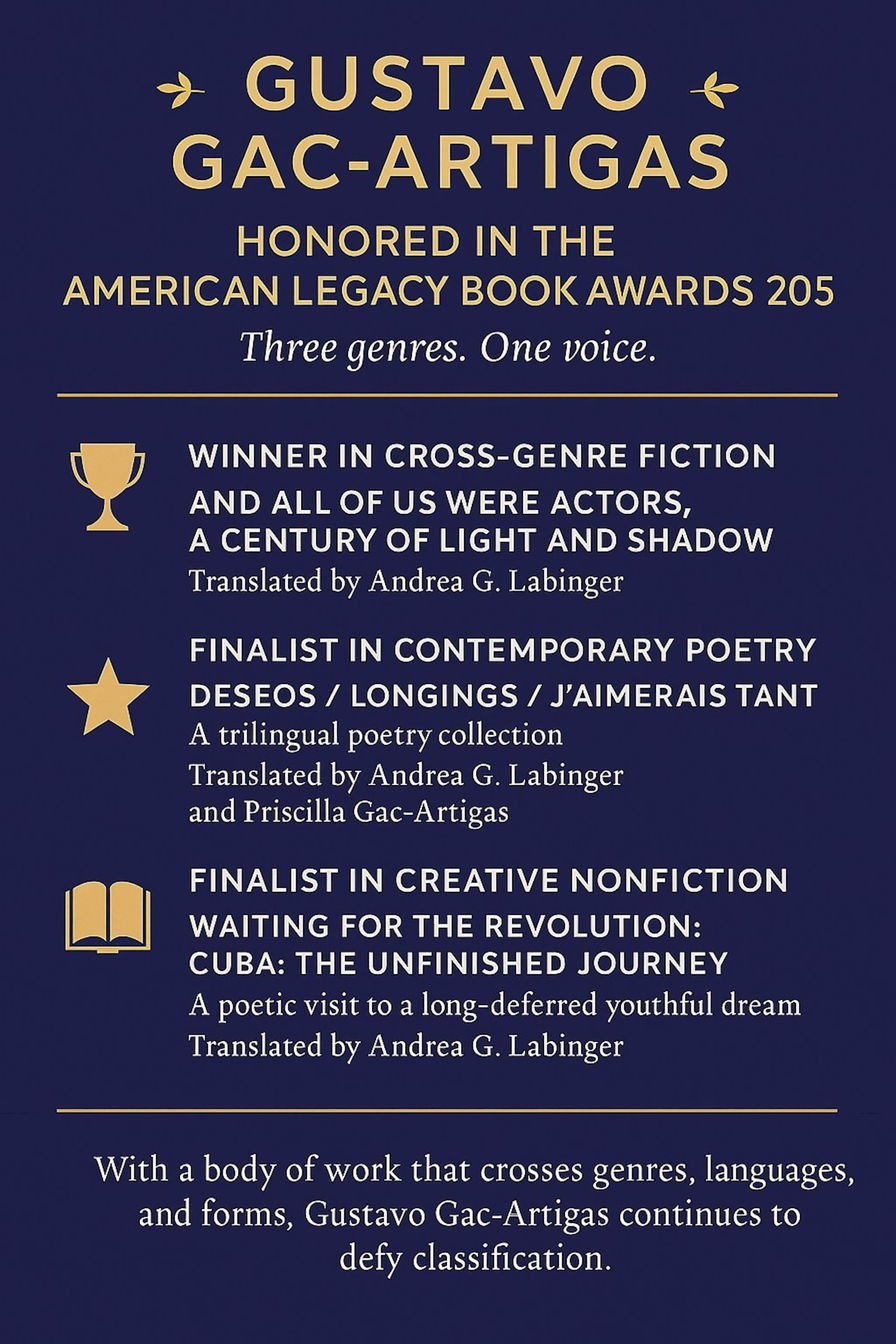
- Y Todos Éramos Actores, un Siglo de Luz y Sombra (And All of Us Were Actors, A Century Of Light And Shadow) (2016)
- English edition translated by Andrea G. Labinger (2017). The novel took second place in the ILBA (International Latino Book Award 2018) in the category Best Fiction Book in Translation - Spanish to English.
- It Was A Time To Dream (1992)
  - Second edition, digital and paperback: It Was Time To Dream Of The Pregnant Birdies (2016)
- And The Earth Was Round (1993)
  - Second edition, digital and paperback: And The Earth Was Round (2016)
- Ado’s Plot of Land (2002)
- An Ordinary Murder 1994

=== Chronicle ===
- CREATIVE NON-FICTION: Waiting for the Revolution: Cuba: The Unfinished Journey (2019) Finalist American Legacy Book Award 2025. Excerpts in revista Rincón de traductores/Translators’ Corner (2020/2021), Harvard University and Observatorio del Español, Instituto Cervantes.
- Chronicle: Navegando los tiempos de la peste (Collection of opinion articles) (2021)

=== College textbooks ===
- To The Point: a complete reference manual for Spanish grammar (Prentice Hall, College Division, 1999)
- Sans Détour: a complete reference manual for French grammar (Prentice Hall, College Division, 1999)
- Roadmap To The Culture And Civilization Of Latin America (Academic Press Jan, 2006, sixth ed. 2012

=== Anthologies ===
- Anthology Of Songs Of Struggle And Hope. Editorial Quimantú, Chile (1973). Co-author: Perla Valencia

=== Links to interviews and Poetry Readings ===
- Gustavo Gac-Artigas: Un académico que optó por la poética del nosotros.
- From Poëzie Vandaag: Intenties (Gustavo Gac-Artigas), Nov 13, 2025
- Fonoteca española de poesía: Del poemario “Deseos”
- Biblioteca nacional digital de Chile: enlaces de lectura gratis a sus novelas.

== Awards and recognitions ==
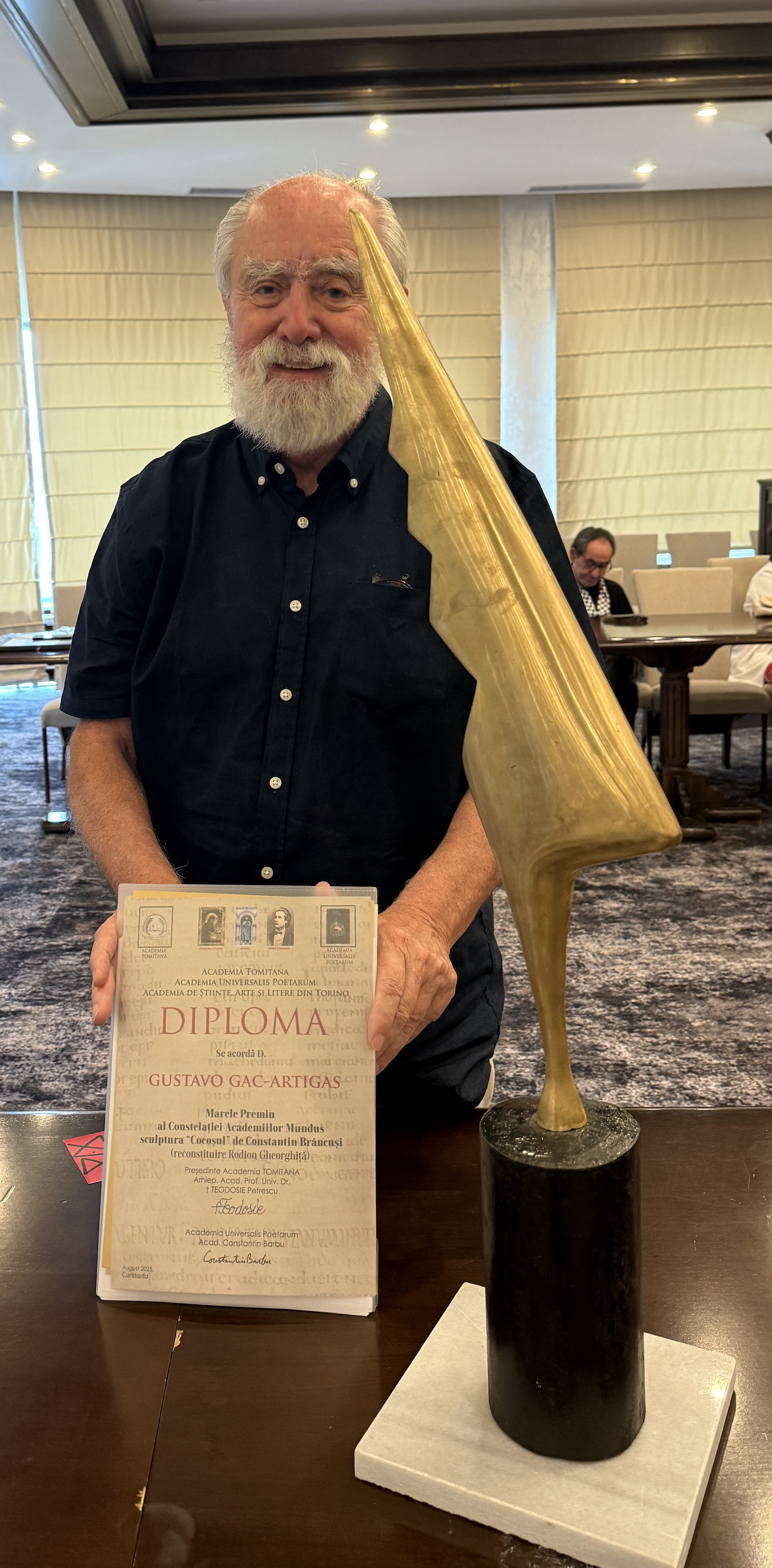

Recognition to his Body of Work / Trajectory

- “Outstanding Achievement Award” at the 9th Boao International Poetry Prize 2026.
- Medal of honor from the IV International Wine and Poetry Festival in Colchagua, Chile, April 2026.
- Award from the Constellation of Academies Mundus, “Cocoșul” reproduction of “The Coq” by Brâncuși, Tomis-Constanza 2025.
- Award Coroana de Aur Ovidius, Tomis-Constanza 2024.
- Award Mihai Eminescu XIII International Poetry Festival, Craiova, Romania, 2024
- Honored Poet of the 17th Hispanic/Latino Book Fair, Queens, 2023
- Proclamation from the New York City Council for his outstanding achievements in literature, 2023
- Citation from the New York State Assembly for his literary career and for his work to keep Spanish alive in the United States, 2023
- Proclamation from the Municipality of Turrialba, Costa Rica, as a Distinguished Poet 2023

Awards to Literary Texts

- Finalist Juan Felipe Herrera Bilingual Poetry Award-International Latino Book Award 2026, Al filo de los días / On the Edge of Days. Prologue: Luis Cruz-Villalobos, trans. by Andrea G. Labinger and Priscilla Gac-Artigas
- Finalist International Book Award, 2026, Si lo hubiera sabido, category “Poetry: General”.
- Finalist International Book Award, 2026, Las cadenas de sor Juana / Sor Juana’s Fetters / Les chaînes de sor Juana, category “Poetry: Contemporary”, trans. by Andrea G. Labinger, Nicole Laurent-Catrice and Priscilla Gac-Artigas.
- Finalist International Book Award, 2025, Confieso que escribo/I Confess That I Write, trans. Andrea G. Labinger y Priscilla Gac-Artigas
- Winner American Legacy Book Awards 2025 cross-genre category for And All of Us Were Actors, A Century of Light and Shadow trans. Andrea G. Labinger
- Finalist American Legacy Book Awards 2025 contemporary poetry category for the trilingual collection, deseos/longings/j’aimerais tant trans. Andrea G. Labinger and Priscilla Gac-Artigas
- Finalist American Legacy Book Awards 2025, nonfiction-creative category for Waiting for the Revolution, Cuba, the Unfinished Journey, trans. Andrea G. Labinger
- "Ossi di seppia", premio a una colección de poemas de un autor extranjero. Italia, 2025.
- Filmscript: CANTO A LA MEMORIA: A POETIC JOURNEY, AN ODE TO MEMORY:
- Winner in two categories: “Best Feature Script” y “Best True Story Script” (World Film Festival-France. Enero 2025)
- Silver Award Winner: Hispanic International Film Festival. March 2025.
- Honorable Mention International Latino Book Award, 2024, hombre de américa/man of the américas, trans. Andrea G. Labinger y Priscilla Gac-Artigas
- Honorable Mention International Latino Book Award, 2024, Confieso que escribo/I Confess That I Write, trans. Andrea G. Labinger y Priscilla Gac-Artigas
- Finalist International Book Award, 2023, hombre de américa/man of the américas, trans. Andrea G. Labinger y Priscilla Gac-Artigas
- Finalist International Latino Book Award 2018, category “best book in translation from Spanish to English” for And All of Us Were Actors, A Century of Light and Shadow trans. Andrea G. Labinger
- Poetry Park Award, Rotterdam 1989, for “Dr. Zamenhofstraat”

Recognition to his Body of Work

- Medal of honor from the IV International Wine and Poetry Festival in Colchagua, Chile, April 2026.
- Award from the Constellation of Academies Mundus, “Cocoșul” reproduction of “The Coq” by Brâncuși, Tomis-Constanza 2025.
- Award Coroana de Aur Ovidius, Tomis-Constanza 2024.
- Award Mihai Eminescu XIII International Poetry Festival, Craiova, Romania, 2024
- Honored Poet of the 17th Hispanic/Latino Book Fair, Queens, 2023
- Proclamation from the New York City Council for his outstanding achievements in literature, 2023
- Citation from the New York State Assembly for his literary career and for his work to keep Spanish alive in the United States, 2023
- Proclamation from the Municipality of Turrialba, Costa Rica, as a Distinguished Poet 2023
