= Altaquer, Nariño =

Settlement in Colombia

Altaquer
- Populated center
- Location in Nariño and Colombia Altaquer (Colombia)
- Coordinates: 1°14′54.0″N 78°5′33.0″W
- Country: Colombia
- Department: Nariño
- Municipality: Barbacoas Municipality
- Elevation: 3,310 ft (1,010 m)

Population (2005)
  - Total: 1,536
- Time zone: UTC-5 (Colombia Standard Time)

Altaquer is a populated center of Colombia in Barbacoas Municipality, Nariño Department in Colombia.

== Climate ==
Altaquer has a relatively cool due to elevation and very wet tropical rainforest climate (Af).

Climate data for Altaquer
Month	Jan	Feb	Mar	Apr	May	Jun	Jul	Aug	Sep	Oct	Nov	Dec	Year
Mean daily maximum °C (°F)	23.5 (74.3)	23.9 (75.0)	24.2 (75.6)	24.3 (75.7)	24.0 (75.2)	23.7 (74.7)	23.8 (74.8)	23.9 (75.0)	23.7 (74.7)	23.6 (74.5)	23.5 (74.3)	23.4 (74.1)	23.8 (74.8)
Daily mean °C (°F)	20.4 (68.7)	20.6 (69.1)	20.8 (69.4)	20.9 (69.6)	20.8 (69.4)	20.5 (68.9)	20.4 (68.7)	20.4 (68.7)	20.3 (68.5)	20.3 (68.5)	20.2 (68.4)	20.2 (68.4)	20.5 (68.9)
Mean daily minimum °C (°F)	17.8 (64.0)	18.1 (64.6)	18.2 (64.8)	18.2 (64.8)	18.3 (64.9)	18.0 (64.4)	17.9 (64.2)	17.9 (64.2)	17.9 (64.2)	18.0 (64.4)	17.9 (64.2)	18.0 (64.4)	18.0 (64.4)
Average rainfall mm (inches)	413.0 (16.26)	300.1 (11.81)	393.4 (15.49)	455.7 (17.94)	417.1 (16.42)	330.9 (13.03)	204.1 (8.04)	152.7 (6.01)	222.5 (8.76)	468.1 (18.43)	452.1 (17.80)	495.2 (19.50)	4,304.9 (169.49)
Average rainy days	28	24	27	27	28	26	23	21	23	28	26	27	308
Average relative humidity (%)	93	93	93	93	94	94	94	94	94	94	94	94	94
Mean monthly sunshine hours	52.7	53.6	62.0	72.0	71.3	69.0	86.8	83.7	60.0	55.8	51.0	46.5	764.4
Mean daily sunshine hours	1.7	1.9	2.0	2.4	2.3	2.3	2.8	2.7	2.0	1.8	1.7	1.5	2.1
