= Santa María de Pantasma =

- Municipality
- Location in Nicaragua
- Coordinates: 13°20′N 85°56′W
- Country: Nicaragua
- Department: Jinotega

Area
  - Municipality: 220 sq mi (560 km^{2})

Population (2017)
  - Municipality: 53.499
  - Density: 0.25/sq mi (0.096/km^{2})
  - Urban: 8.326

Santa María de Pantasma is a municipality in the Jinotega department of Nicaragua.
