= Götz von Houwald =

German diplomat and academic (1913–2001)

Götz Freiherr von Houwald (13 May 1913 – 16 August 2001) was a German diplomat, historian, and ethnographer. He was born in Posen and died in Bonn. His full name was Maximilian Otto Gustav Albrecht Hubert Wilhelm Götz-Dieter Freiherr von Houwald. Götz-Dieter von Houwald's parents were Albrecht Freiherr von Houwald and Helene Gräfin von Carmer.

He completed his secondary education in 1934 at the Paul-Gerhardt-Schule in Lübben. He went on to study law and journalism in Berlin. In 1940 he joined the German air force. In 1944 he was taken prisoner of war in north Africa. An unsuccessful escape attempt led to longer imprisonment. In 1948 he was released. After a short stint as a journalist, he entered the West German diplomatic service. In 1952 he was envoy to Peru and in 1961 to Ireland. Five years later he was appointed ambassador to the Central African Republic. In 1969 he was transferred to Managua as ambassador to Nicaragua.

His time in Nicaragua saw his interest in the Sumu Indians begin and develop. After his retirement in 1975, Houwald studied ethnology and Hispanic studies at the Universität Bonn, obtaining a doctorate in 1978.

== Selected publications ==
- Los alemanes en Nicaragua (= Colección Cultural, Band 2). Banco de America, Managua 1975, 2nd edition 1993; in German: Deutsches Leben in Nicaragua. Auswanderer-Schicksale. Nicaragua-Gesellschaft, Bonn 1986, ISBN 3-925-290-60-5
- Die Niederlausitzer Rittergüter und ihre Besitzer. Degener, Neustadt an der Aisch
- Nicolás de Valenzuela: Conquista del Lacandón y conquista del Chol. Relación sobre la expedición de 1695 contra los Lacandones e Itzá según el "Manuscrito de Berlin" (= Bibliotheca Ibero-Americana, Band 28). Colloquium-Verlag, Berlin 1979, ISBN 3-7678-0485-9
- Diccionario Español-Sumu, Sumu-Español. Ministerio de Educación, [La Habana] 1980
- with Francisco Rener: Mayangna yulnina kulna balna = Tradiciones orales de los indios Sumus = Mündliche Überlieferungen der Sumu-Indianer (= Bonner amerikanistische Studien, Band 11). Seminar für Völkerkunde, Bonn 1984, ISBN 3-86097-305-3
- Mayangna = Wir. Zur Geschichte der Sumu-Indianer in Mittelamerika (= Beiträge zur mittelamerikanischen Völkerkunde, Band 19). Renner, Hohenschäftlarn bei München 1990, ISBN 3-87673-134-8; in Spanish: Mayangna. Apuntes sobre la historia de los indígenas Sumu en Centroamérica. Fundación Vida, Managua 2003, ISBN 99924-53-15-X

== Publications about Houwald ==
- Peter Bahl: "Houwald, Maximilian Otto Gustav Albrecht Hubert Wilhelm Götz-Dieter Frhr. v." In: Friedrich Beck and Eckart Henning (eds.): Brandenburgisches Biographisches Lexikon (= Einzelveröffentlichung der Brandenburgischen Historischen Kommission e.V., Band 5). Verlag für Berlin-Brandenburg, Potsdam 2002, ISBN 3-935035-39-X, pp. 187–188
- "Ich schaue mit Stolz auf Lübben und auf seine Menschen." In: Lausitzer Rundschau. January 3, 2000 (Interview with Götz-Dieter Freiherr von Houwald)
- Bernd Juds: "Der Niederlausitz sehr verbunden. Götz-Dieter von Houwald wurde am Wochenende auf dem Familienfriedhof in Groß Jehser beigesetzt." In: Lausitzer Rundschau. October 8, 2001
- Berthold Riese: "Götz-Dieter Freiherr von Houwald (Posen 13. Mai 1913 – Bonn 16. August 2001)." In: Indiana. Vol. 17/18, 2000/2001, pp. 409–416. ISSN 0341-8642
- Wer ist’s? 1974/75, P. 449
