= San Ramón, Nicaragua =

San Ramón
- Municipality
- Location in Nicaragua
- Coordinates: 12°55′N 85°50′W
- Country: Nicaragua
- Department: Matagalpa

Area
  - Municipality: 164 sq mi (424 km^{2})

Population (2005)
  - Municipality: 30,682
  - Density: 187/sq mi (72.4/km^{2})
  - Urban: 2,744
- Climate: Aw

San Ramón is a municipality in the Matagalpa department of Nicaragua.

San Ramon lies 12 kilometers northeast of the departmental capital of Matagalpa (city and department are both named Matagalpa). The 12-kilometer drive takes about 15 minutes by taxi, 20 minutes by bus. The road is entirely paved.

== History ==
San Ramon was established in 1800, having previously been called by the indigenous name "Abai". San Ramon was historically settled by a mixture of Sumo and Miskito peoples from Nicaragua's Atlantic coast, as well as by Chontales Indians, who are a branch stemming from the ancient Mayans.

== Climate ==
San Ramon typically experiences light rain for about 1.5 hours each day regardless of the time of year. It often rains for a short period during the afternoon, helping to keep the weather cool. Then it rains again briefly at night, typically heavier rainfall than afternoon. Because of a relatively high altitude, the climate is cooler than the majority of Nicaragua, having year-round lows in the low 60s and highs around mid-80's degrees.

== Tourism ==
It is an integral part of Nicaragua's Coffee trail, and is the jump-off point for a significant amount of tourism. Some of the touristic attractions include: taking an English-speaking guide to the abandoned gold mine "La Reina" (5 kilometers from town), the waterfalls "La Lima" and "La Garrota" which are respectively about 1.5 kilometers and 3 kilometers from the city center, a guided historic tour of "Cerro de la cruz" (Hill of the cross) where you can eat your fill of fresh fruit and see the city and surrounding countryside from rustic wooden benches, and finally trips to see local artisans creating artisanal textiles, recycled paper stationery, and jewelry from seeds and other local commodities.

Other tourist attractions that are nearby and directly affect the town's revenue are the eco-resort "Esperanza Verde" and "La Selva Negra".

There is generally a high presence of foreigners in San Ramon due to its hospitable climate and a history of international aid stations being placed there. Seattle-based non-profit, Corner of Love, leads more than twenty medical-dental-optical brigades per year to serve in San Ramon and sixty outer-lying villages. The organization's volunteers can be seen working on education and clean water projects in numerous rural communities, offering mobile healthcare clinics in area villages, and supporting Corner of Love's Nicaraguan staff members who carry out native-led healthcare campaigns. San Ramon's local tourism office is supported by the Interamerican Foundation and is currently working on a web page, and USAID and Peace Corps have frequently been present there. Additionally, San Ramon is the location of the Associacion Catalana where Spaniards consult and assist the locals in coffee production, adult education, building initiatives with wood and bamboo, and teaching scholarships.
