= Diario Siglo XXI =

Spanish newspaper

- Diario digital independiente, plural y abierto
- Type: Digital newspaper
- Language: Spanish
- Headquarters: Valencia
- Circulation: 199,176 digital (as of April 2024)
- Website: diariosigloxxi.com

Diario Siglo XXI (Spanish for "Newspaper 21st Century") is an online newspaper headquartered in Valencia, Spain. Self-defined as independent, plural and open, it has no political orientation.

More than 100 journalists, columnists, critics and other professionals collaborate with this publication.
