= San José de Bocay =

- Municipality
- Location in Nicaragua
- Coordinates: 13°32′N 85°32′W
- Country: Nicaragua
- Department: Jinotega

Area
  - Municipality: 1,540 sq mi (3,990 km^{2})

Population (2022 estimate)
  - Municipality: 74,589
  - Density: 48.4/sq mi (18.7/km^{2})
  - Urban: 14,017

San José de Bocay is a town and a municipality in the Jinotega department, Nicaragua.

With an area of 3,990.40 km^{2}, the municipality of San José de Bocay was officially created on March 13, 2002, as a result of the division of the El Cuá-Bocay municipality. As of 2006, San José de Bocay is the newest municipality in Nicaragua. San José de Bocay is located near the Rio Bocay river and is along the NN-66 road.

== International relations ==
=== Twin towns – Sister cities ===
Since 1989 San José de Bocay has had a sister-city relationship with Blacksburg, Virginia.

- (United States) Blacksburg, Virginia
