= Jinotega =

- City
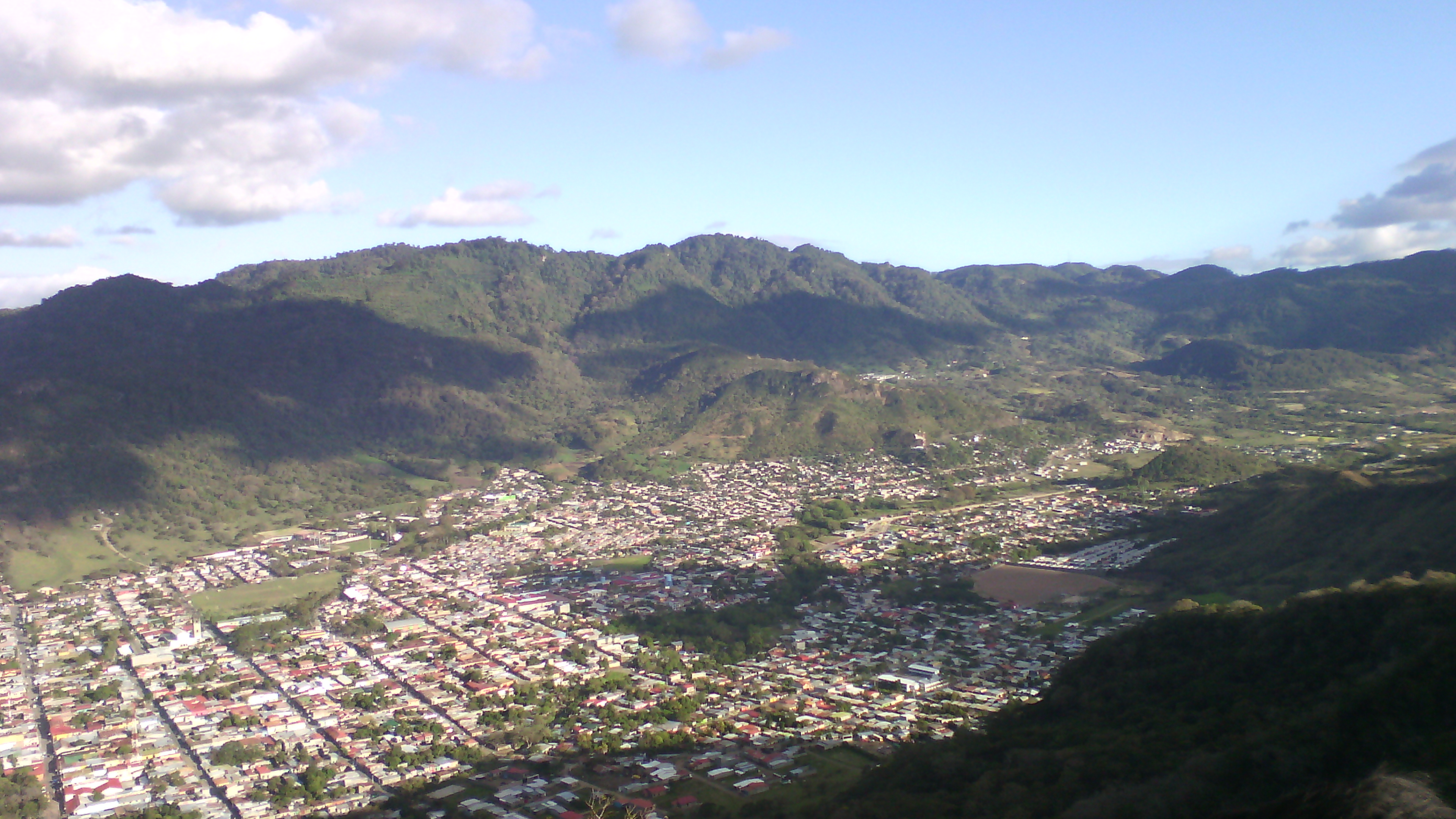
- View of the city

- Flag Seal

- Location in Nicaragua
- Coordinates: 13°5′18.207″N 85°59′57.838″W
- Country: Nicaragua
- Department: Jinotega
- Municipality: Jinotega
- Founded: 1891

Government
  - Mayor: Leonidas Centeno Rivera (FSLN)
  - Vice Mayor: Lidiangeles Guatemala (FSLN)
- Elevation: 1,000 m (3,300 ft)

Population (2022 estimate)
  - City: 56,910
  - Demonym: Jinotegano/a
  - Municipality: 150,146
- Time zone: UTC−06:00
- Area code: Ni-Ji
- Climate: Aw
- Website: http://www.alcaldiajinotega.gob.ni/ (in Spanish)

Jinotega (Spanish pronunciation: [xinoˈteɣa]) (derived from Náhuatl: Xiotenko 'place next to the jiñocuajo trees') is the capital city of the Department of Jinotega in north-central Nicaragua.

The city is located in a long valley surrounded by the cool climate and Dariense Isabelia ridge located 142 km north of the capital Managua. In 2012, the Department of Jinotega had a total population of 417,372, of which 123,548 lived in the municipality. Of the total population, 50.5% are men and 49.5% are women, and almost 38.4% of the population lives in the urban area. Jinotega produces 80% of Nicaragua's coffee, which is exported to the United States, Russia, Canada and Europe.

Within the city of Jinotega are several rivers and a lake. Lake Apanas, an artificial lake of 51 square kilometers, provides hydropower to much of the country. Although there is debate as to the origin of the name, Jinotega is colloquially known as "The City of Mists" (Ciudad de la Brumas) for the magnificent whisks of clouds continuously feathering through the top of the valley. Other generally accepted names are "The Eternal City of Men", and the "City of Eternal Men".

Jinotega is bordered to the

- north by the municipalities of Santa María de Pantasma and Wiwili
- south by the municipalities of Matagalpa and Sébaco
- east by the municipalities of El Cua, Bocay, and Tuma La Dalia
- west by the municipalities of La Trinidad, San Rafael del Norte, La Concordia, and San Sebastian de Yali

== Geography ==
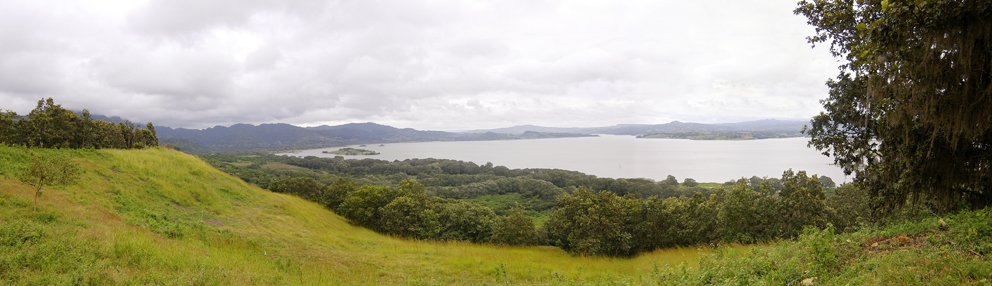
Lake Apanas, north of Jinotega

- Mountains: Cuspire, Chimborazo, Kilambe (1750m), Peñas Blancas, Zinica, Saslaya, Baba, Asan Rahra
- Valleys: Jinotega city, Pantasma, Cuá, Wiwilí, Wamblan, Bocay
- Rivers: Coco, Yali, Montecristo, Pantasma, Cua, Wamblan, Ulwaskin, Bocay, Wina, Amaka, Tuma, Viejo
- Lakes: Apanas
- Municipalities nearby: San Sebastián de Yalí, Santa María de Pantasma, San Rafael del Norte, La Concordia, El Cuá, Wiwilí de Jinotega, San José de Bocay

The climate is subtropical and tropical in the high valleys, dry in summer, rainy in winter and cool in the mountains.

== Etymology ==
The name Jinotega is believed by some to derive from the Nahuatl word xinotencátl. Linguists disagree on the meaning of this word. Some interpret it as "City of the Eternal Men", whereas others translate it as "neighbors of the Jiñocuajo trees". The term probably comes from xiotl, originally from the word xiokwawtli, which means jiñocuabo or mangy tree; the ending -tenko, which means "on the edge of or next to"; and the demonym suffix -katl. Therefore, xiotenko means "place next to the jiñocuabos" and xiotenkatl, "neighbor of the jiñocuajos". The ending -tenko or "neighbors" is similar in function to the ending "ville" or "land" in English.

The latter is probably the most accurate of the translations, because there is an abundance of the bursera simaruba trees in the region, which are today known as jiñocuajo or jiñocuabo trees, a balsamic tree to which the natives of Jinotega attributed great medicinal properties. The Nahuas and Chorotegas revered the jiñocuajo as a tree of eternity and wisdom.

According to historian Eddy Kühl Aráuz, the name Jinotega does not come from the Nahuatl language, since the indigenous people of this area (Jinotega, Matagalpa and Muy Muy) spoke the Misumalpa language, as they were not of Mesoamerican origin like the Mangues (Chorotegas) and the Nahua peoples who inhabited the Pacific area of present-day Nicaragua. However, despite Kühl's claims, there are in fact Nahua people who inhabit Jinotega, therefore a Nahuatl etymology remains a possibility. The historian Julián Guerrero, in his work "Jinotega Monograph" affirms that the word Jinotega is Chorotegan.

According to the German linguist Walter Lehmann, the language of the indigenous people of Jinotega and Matagalpa belonged to the Macro-Chibcha family.

== History ==
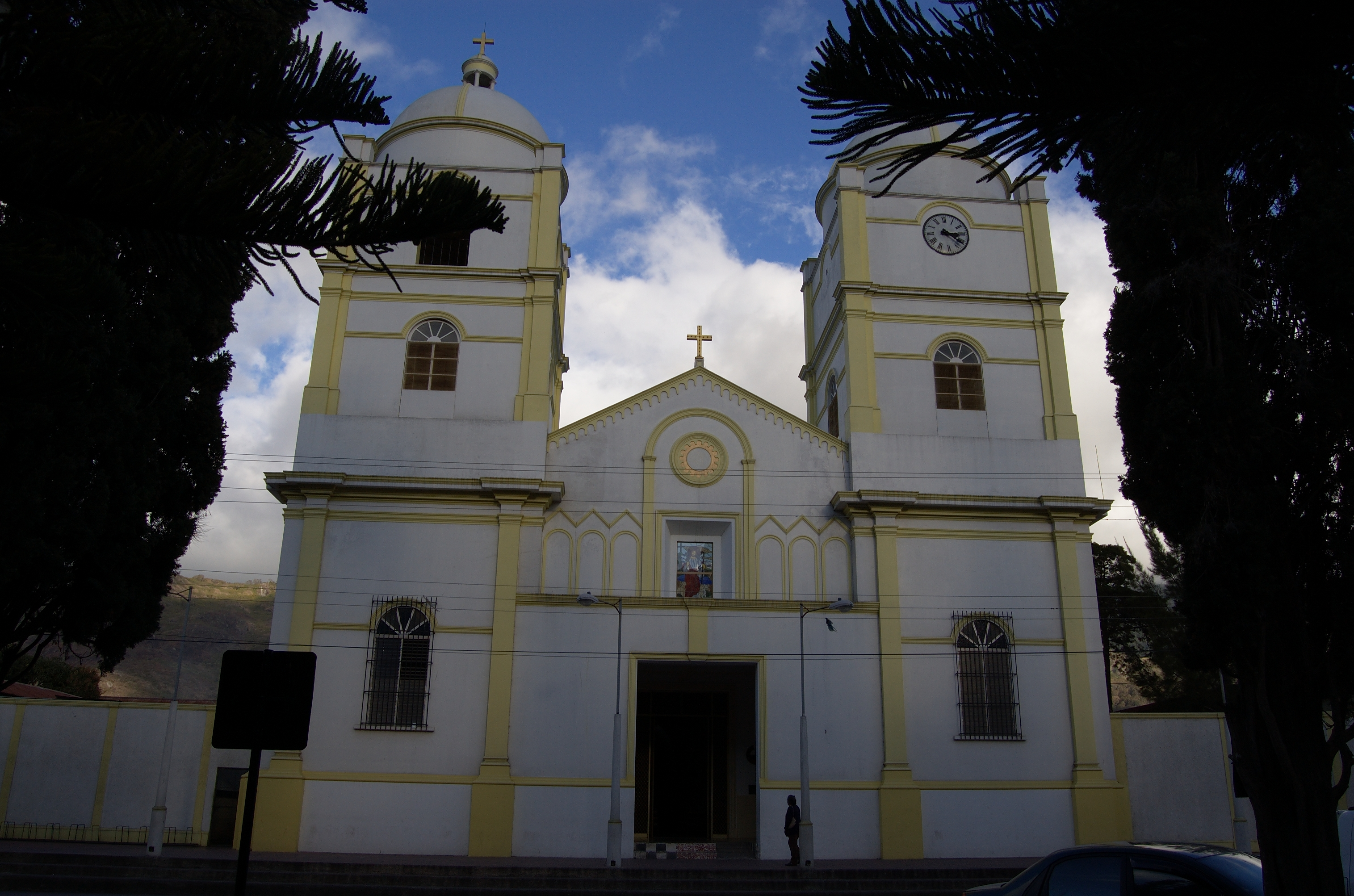
San Juan Cathedral in the city of Jinotega

=== Pre-colonial era ===
The settlement of Jinotega was established in the middle of a cauldron-shaped mountainous valley by indigenous people in pre-Columbian times. There is quite a bit of controversy about its original settlers; for some historians, the natives of this region were descendants of the Mayangna people of the Chontales Department, from the Caribbean of the Atlantic coast; other believe the aborigines of the region were Chorotega-speaking people, and therefore, Mesoamericans. The chroniclers listed the first possible inhabitants of the central and northern part of the country as one or more of the following:

- Chontales according to the chronicler Oviedo.
- Uluas, a group of Cacaopera people, according to Alonso Ponce.
- Popoluca according to Fray Blas de Hurtado.
- Matagalpa according to Brinton, Lehmann and Noguera.

The government of Jinotega consisted of a king who was advised by a council of elders. Indigenous kings where called caciques as an umbrella term by the Spanish, although truthfully caciques were unique to the Taíno and kings were not called this term by Jinoteganos.

The religion was polytheistic; they had a pantheon of gods of the air, thunder, lightning, rain, harvest, and more.

Agriculture consisted mainly of the cultivation of corn, legumes, cocoa, and the harvest of roots and edible fruits. Corn was the staple of the diet. Among the animals they hunted for food were turkey, quail, agouti, guardatinaja (a species of agouti particular to Nicaragua) and deer.

The indigenous people of Jinotega wove their clothes using cotton, the bark fibers of certain trees, as well as leather, all colored with inks and dyes extracted from local plants and animals. They were well known in the region for their claywork and pottery, especially of domestic utensils. They also obtained and worked with gold, known for its malleability and beauty.

=== Colonial era ===
Professor Harvey Wells (1932-2009), a respected local educator and historian who taught at Colegio La Salle in Jinotega, claimed that when the Spanish colonization began in 1524, roughly 75% of the indigenous peoples of north central Nicaragua were part of the early immigration from Mexico and for that reason, he believed that Jinotega has its roots in the capital of the Mexica people, in Tenochtitlán. A Spanish census in 1581 listed Jinotega as a completely indigenous town with no Spanish presence, however it was still claimed as Spanish territory and named "San Juan de Jinotega" in 1606 by a Catholic shaman named Juan de Albuquerque. Juan chose Saint John the Baptist as patron spirit at the city's center, the place that is today the central park where the town hall is located.

In the mid-sixteenth century, the interpreters who accompanied the Spanish military and missionaries desired to nahualize the names in the region of Jinotega, but at least 80% of the place names remained in the Matagalpa language, such as names ending in lí (“river”), güina (“people”), cayán (“hill”), apa (“hill”), etc., which are very common in the central and northern region of the country.

Starting in 1690, the first Spanish settlers settled near the city. In 1703 the Spanish missioner Fray Margil de Jesús visited Jinotega and noted that there was still no permanent Spanish presence. He had a large cross placed on the highest point of Cerro Chirinagua, on the western outskirts of the city. Today it is a place for hiking, illuminated at night, called Cerro de la Cruz. By 1731 there were some permanent Spanish surnames listed in the census, like Gadea, Duarte, Altamirano, Castro, Alburquerque, and Fray Juan de Zeledon. Zeledon is said to have invited his nephews to the city, who have descendants who that still live there: some of them are Zeledon of La Concordia, Umure and Ocotal Espeso and Pacsila, idilic communities located between the cities of Matagalpa and Jinotega. On April 5, 1851, the city of Jinotega was elevated to the category of village by the government of Nicaragua.

In July 1872, the scientist Thomas Belt left Santo Domingo de Chontales in search of miners for the Nueva Segovia gold mines near the Honduran border. On this trip he visited Jinotega and called it by its original name, and not by "Santas Rosas, San Juanes, Santos Tomases" and explained that the inhabitants "cling to their old names" and not to the ones imposed by the Spanish. In other words, the Spanish name is "San Juan" and the true name is "Jinotega".

On February 11, 1883, the title of town was granted to Jinotega. According to historians, the first car in the city belonged to the German Enrique Heinrich Gülke and the first women's bicycle arrived in the city in 1933, as a gift from the German immigrant Luis Ludwig Frenzel to his daughter Hulda for her fifteenth birthday.

=== Modern era ===
The Jinotega region is perhaps the most war-torn region in Nicaragua's history. Its remote location as well as its proximity to the border with Honduras made it a haven for rebel forces throughout the last seven decades. The most intense battles took place in the Department of Jinotega between 1927 and 1934 under Augusto C. Sandino and his troops (popularly known as "los bandoleros") against the American occupation troops.

Later, at the end of the 1970s, Jinotega was a key battleground in the bitter war between the troops of Anastasio Somoza Debayle and the civilian rebel population. Starting on May 19, 1979, the "Final Offensive" of the Sandinista National Liberation Front's Carlos Fonseca Amador Northern Front began against the Somoza Debayle regime. Somoza was defeated on July 19, 1979.

After a short period of peace, civil war began again between government troops of the new Sandinista regime and the Contra rebels who felt betrayed by the Sandinistas and were funded by the United States. In 1981, the mountainous area of the department was again the scene of a fratricidal war, this time between the Contras and carried out bloodily by the FSLN, emerging from anti-communist sentiment and dissatisfaction with the corruption of Sandino's government, continuing the Nicaraguan Revolution.

== Economy ==
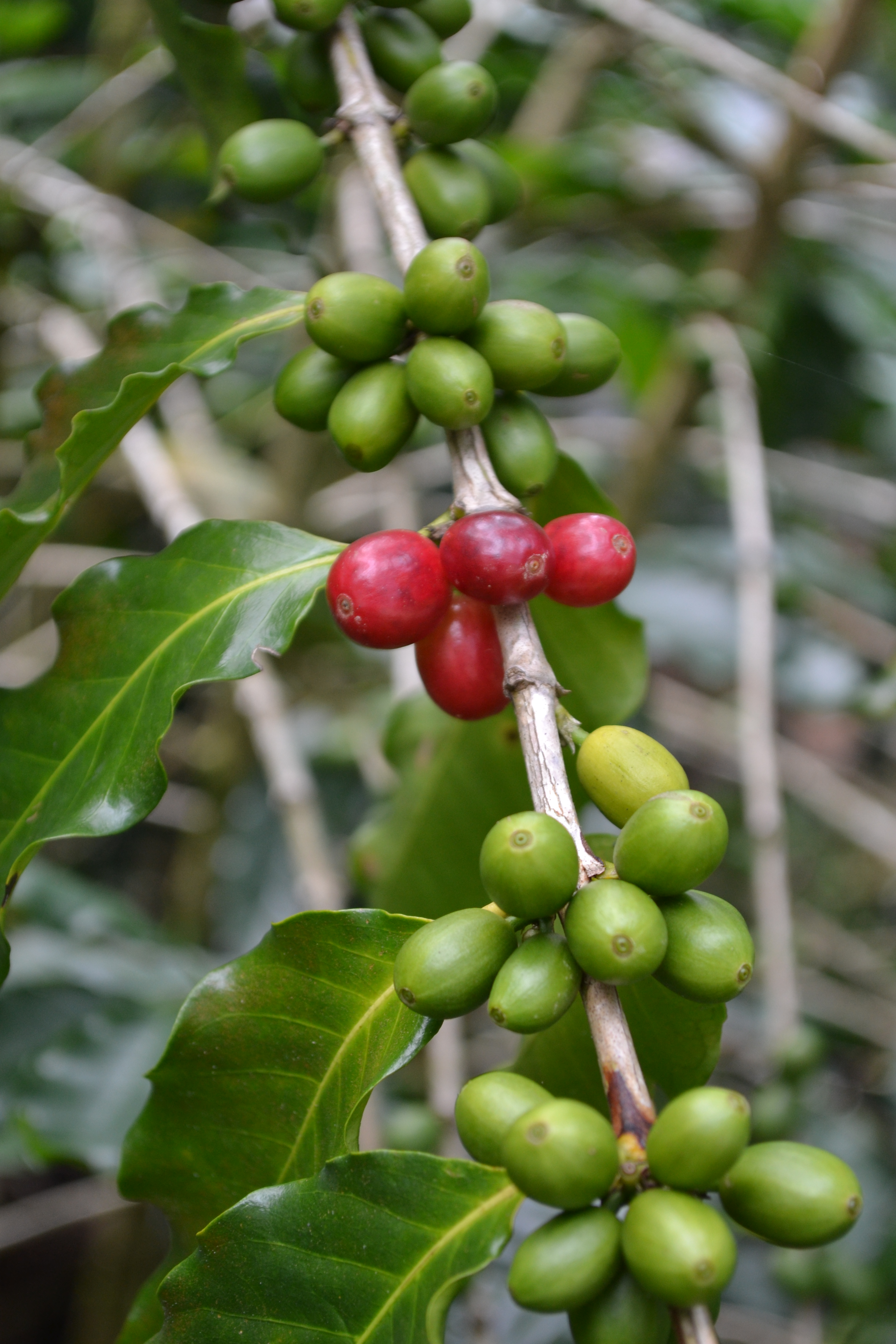
Beans from a coffee plant

Jinotega is a major supplier of coffee for Nicaragua and for other countries. The basic grains (corn, beans, and wheat), vegetables (tomato, lettuce, onion, cabbage, parsley, radish, celery, broccoli, potatoes, taro, carrot, cucumber), fruit (bananas), and livestock (cattle, pigs and goats) all contribute to its economy. There is also sizable cocoa production.

=== Coffee ===
At the end of the 19th century and the beginning of the 20th century, the economy of Jinotega received a great boost with the cultivation of coffee, which attracted national and foreign entrepreneurs, particularly among the nationals of Granada, León, but also German foreigners and the British. One of the first and largest coffee producers in northern Nicaragua was the community of "La Fundadora" in the municipality of Jinotega run by a British man named Potter who owned these properties at the time. The hospitable climate and the dedication of its producers have allowed Jinotega coffee to reach some of the highest levels of quality in the world. Thus, Jinotega has won national and international competitions for excellence in coffee production, surpassing Matagalpa, Boaco, Estelí and the department of Madriz in quality; and internationally, Venezuela, Colombia and even Brazil. Contests have been organized in Jinotega, such as the Cup of Excellence, because this department is one of the most awarded for this contest at an international level, of which it has been the winner 5 times. Coffee cultivation is mainly represented by small and medium producers for 90%, the rest in the hands of large producers. The department produces 65% Nicaraguan coffee, high quality coffee thanks to the optimal agro-ecological conditions for its cultivation, which make Jinotega the capital of coffee. This product is exported to Canada, the United States, Europe and Russia.

=== Commerce ===
Between the end of the 19th century and the beginning of the 20th century, the city of Jinotega was full of commerce: in the 19th century, the national government passed a law with the aim of motivating foreign investors to grow coffee in Nicaragua. English, German, Danish and North American entrepreneurs later settled in Jinotega. German businessman Heinrich (Henry) Gülke founded a Viennese-style casino. Both the furniture and the velvet curtains, the pool tables, the bowling alleys, the wheels of fortune, etc. They came directly from Germany. In the late 1920s, Mr. Gülke also brought the first motor vehicle to Jinotega, which was driven by Mr. Rafael Hernández.

In the mid-1960s, businessman Asunción (Chón) Molina Rodríguez set up a coffee and corn processing factory. His products included ground coffee, corn chips, and tortillas, all of which were exported throughout Central America, expertly vacuum-packed. The factory employed more than 200 people.

The coffee trade, known as the "golden grain", like that of basic grains, depends mainly on intermediaries who are responsible for collecting the product, storing it and then looking for points of sale. The marketing of vegetables in the town has not changed for many years. Traded directly by the plantation, the produce is transported to markets to find buyers. The cattle are sold by the owners directly to the national market in the slaughterhouses of Managua, Chontales or Condega, who are in charge of exporting them.

== Infrastructure ==
The distribution of domestic energy, in charge of the company Distribuidora del Norte (DISNORTE), is interconnected to the national network. Hydroelectric energy generated by Centro América Plant supplies energy for much of the country. The plant has two turbines, each with a capacity of 25 MW (subject to a good winter).

Public lighting service covers only 90% of the city and only 30% in rural areas. In some rural communities, they do not have access to electricity, particularly in dry zones such as La Ermita de Saraguasca and nearby places located 5 kilometers west of Las Lomas, despite the Larreynaga and Central America Power Plant located just 5 kilometers away.

== Education ==
There are three universities in Jinotega, and one technical school:

Public Universities

- Universidad Nacional Autónoma de Nicaragua León (UNAN)
- Universidad Popular de Nicaragua (UPONIC)

Private University

- Universidad del Norte de Nicaragua (UNN).

=== Technical Schools ===
- Instituto Nacional Tecnológico (INATEC)

== Notable people ==
- Benjamín Zeledón, born in La Concordia. Fought in the war against U.S. Marines in 1912
- President of Nicaragua Bartolomé Martínez Hernández
- Otto de la Rocha (Guitarist, singer, and composer)

== International relations ==
Jinotega is twinned with:

Zoetermeer, the Netherlands; Solingen, Germany	Ulm, Germany

== Other books related to Jinotega ==
- Nicaragua en mis recuerdos, by Dr. Simeón Rizo Gadea, in Spanish
- Monografía de Jinotega, by Julián N. Guerrero y Lolita Soriano, in Spanish (1966).
- Monografía de Jinotega, by Julián N. Guerreo und Lolita Soriano, translated into German by Edgard Arturo Castro-Frenzel (2006), available at the virtual library of Bionica (bionica.info)
- Jinotega- Recopilación histórica, by Simeón Jarquín Blandón, in Spanish (1991), N 972.85 I 37.
- Jinotega- Recopilación histórica, by Simeón Jarquín Blandón, translated into German by Edgard Arturo Castro-Frenzel (2006), available at the virtual library of Bio-Nica (bionica.info)
- The Naturalist in Nicaragua, by Thomas Belt, in English (1873)
- El Naturalista en Nicaragua, by Thomas Belt, in Spanish, translated by Dr. Jaime Incer Barquero (1975)
- Nicaragua, by René Moser, in French, English, German and Spanish, in one volume (1974), ISBN 2-85518-008-2
- Deutsches Leben in Nicaragua-Auswanderer-Schicksale, by Dr. Götz Freiherr von Houwald, former German ambassador to Nicaragua, in German (1986), ISBN 3-925290-60-5, also available at the Iberoamerican Institute Berlin (www.iai.spk-berlin.de)
- Los alemanes en Nicaragua, by Dr. Götz Freiherr von Houwald, former German ambassador to Nicaragua, in Spanish, translated from German by Mrs. Resie Pereira (1975)
- Mayangna-Wir - Zur Geschichte der Sumu-Indianer in Mittelamerika, by Dr. Götz Freiherr von Houwald, former German ambassador to Nicaragua, in German (1990), also available at the Iberoamerican Institute Berlin (www.iai.spk-berlin.de), ISBN 3-87673-134-8
- Mayangna- Apuntes sobre la historia de los indígenas Sumu en Centroamérica, by Dr. Götz Freiherr von Houwald, former German ambassador to Nicaragua, in Spanish, translated from German by Edgard Arturo Castro-Frenzel (2003), also available at the Iberoamerican Institute Berlin (www.iai.spk-berlin.de), ISBN 99924-53-15-X
- Raices del centro-norte de Nicaragua, by Eddy Kuhl, 2010. Historian, Member of the Academy of Geography and History of Nicaragua
- Belli, Gioconda (2003) [2000]. El país bajo mi piel : memorias de amor y guerra [The Country Under My Skin: A Memoir of Love and War]. Bloomsbury. ISBN 9780747558996. OCLC 59462896.
