= Cultural activism =

Cultural activism is the denomination of several creative practices and activities which challenge dominant interpretations and constructions of the world while presenting alternative socio-political and spatial imaginaries in ways which challenge relationships between art, politics, participation, and spectatorship. It implies the use and creation of cultural products to promote social change and may include art, literature, music, cinema, among others..

Notable examples include culture jamming, subvertising, muralling, rebel clowning, urban knitting, guerrilla urbanism, political theatre and many other whimsical, non-violent approaches to protest and activism.

== Digital activism ==
Digital activism regarding educational inequalities by youth and young adults is another form of cultural activism, used in digital spaces to promote and create change.

== Social change ==
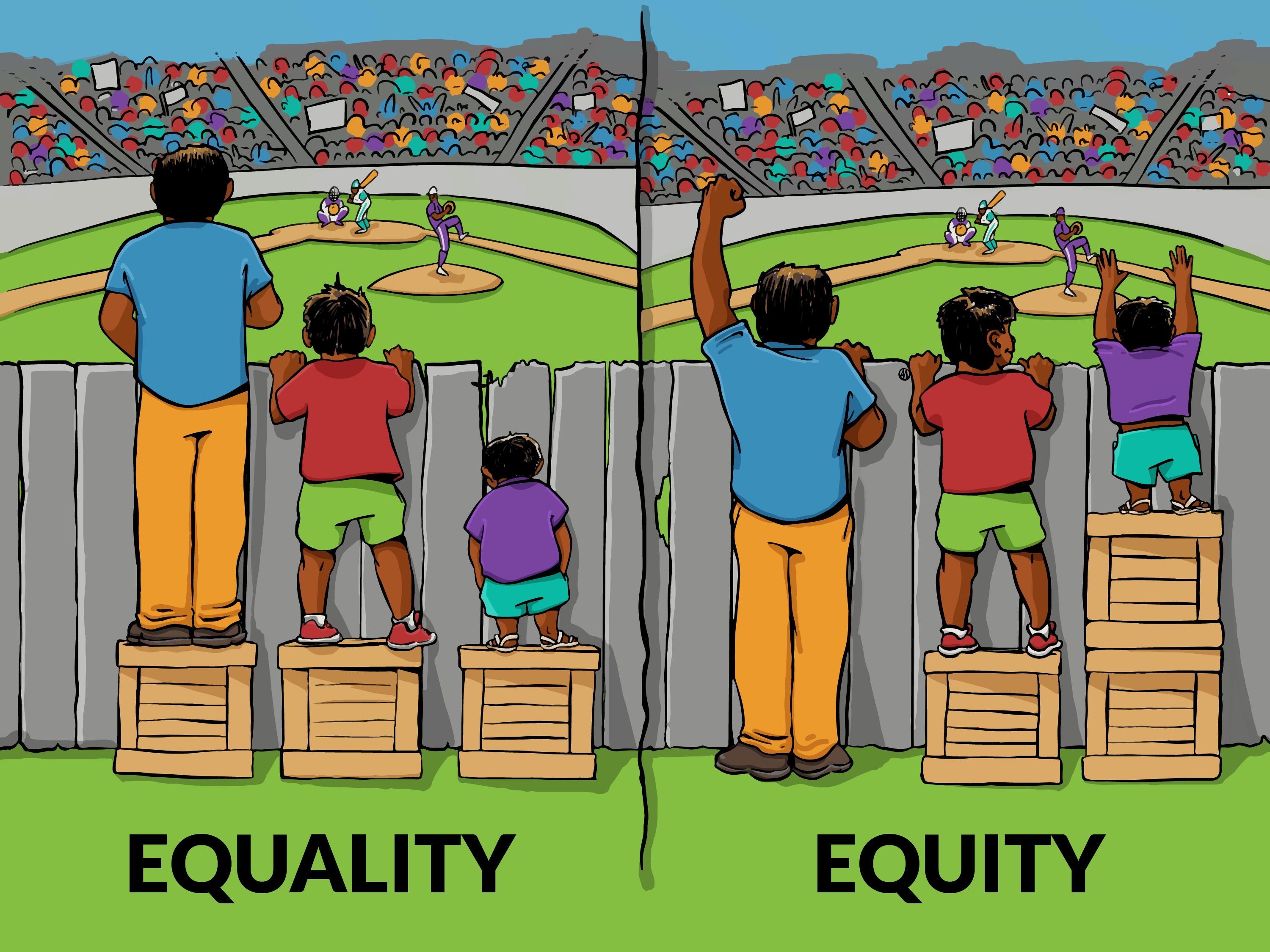
A perspective of social change

Cultural activism takes place in large to small scales from many different individuals, groups, and cultures looking to make social change.

== Solidarity ==
Cultural activism can be and also is utilized creatively to bring connection, care, and justice between individuals and groups in their efforts to promote and advocate for justice. Solidarity between different groups and individuals can create an environment for creative work and ideas towards justice movements.

== Statues ==
Toppling statues is an act of cultural activism in which individuals, groups, and communities can challenge harmful or negative cultural and social narratives and power dynamics from the past, as well as presently.

== Connection ==
Cultural activism towards justice, social, and revolutionary movements also connects individuals and groups in intimate ways towards creatively creating new methods towards addressing societal issues.

== Resource ==
Cultural activism can also be a resource that creates and cultivates creative ideas, initiatives, comradery, innovations, and new resources.

== Academic environments ==
Cultural activism in academic environments is a method that is utilized to challenge social and academic injustices in those spaces communicatively and critically, while also bringing solidarity and intellectual activism to transcend those systems and environments.
