= Rancho Grande =

- Municipality
- Location in Nicaragua
- Coordinates: 13°15′13″N 85°33′10″W
- Country: Nicaragua
- Department: Matagalpa

Area
  - Municipality: 231 sq mi (598 km^{2})

Population (2022)
  - Municipality: 42,383
  - Density: 184/sq mi (70.9/km^{2})
  - Urban: 8,365

Rancho Grande is a municipality in the Matagalpa department of Nicaragua. As of 2022, its population was 42,383.

== Notable people ==
- Petrona Hernández López, aka Amanda Aguilar (1890-2007), Sandinist revolutionary
- Carlos Javier Jarquín (born 1990), poet, journalist and cultural activist
