= Matagalpa Department =

Department of Nicaragua

Coordinates: 12°55′N 85°55′W

Matagalpa Departamento de Matagalpa
- Department
- Flag

- Country: Nicaragua
- Established: 1862
- Capital: Matagalpa

Area
  - Total: 6,804 km^{2} (2,627 sq mi)

Population (2023 estimate)
  - Total: 613,262
  - Density: 90.13/km^{2} (233.4/sq mi)
- ISO 3166-2: NI-MT

Matagalpa (Spanish pronunciation: [mataˈɣalpa]) is an administrative division and department in Nicaragua. It covers an area of 6,804 km^{2} (2,627 sq mi) and has a population of 613,262 in 2023. The capital and seat of the department is at Matagalpa. It is one of the country's principal coffee-producing regions.

== Geography ==
Matagalpa is one of the departments of Nicaragua. It is situated in the central part of the country and covers an area of 6,804 km^{2} (2,627 sq mi). It borders the departments of Jinotega, Boaco, Managua, León, and the North and South Caribbean Coast Autonomous Region. Matagalpa is the seat of the department, and the major commercial centre in the region. It is located along the Pan American Highway and watered by the Río Grande de Matagalpa and its tributaries.

The topography of the department is generally mountainous at an average elevation of above 700 m (2,300 ft). The Dariense and Isabellia mountain ranges pass through the department. There are several waterfalls including the Rio Santa Emilia and reserves including the Apante Hill nature reserve and Selva Negra. The region experiences a tropical climate and significant rainfall.

The department includes thirteen municipalities–Ciudad Darío, Tuma-La Dalia, Esquipulas, Matagalpa, Matiguás, Muy Muy, Rancho Grande, Río Blanco, San Dionisio, San Isidro, San Ramón, Sébaco, and Terrabona.

== Demographics and culture ==
As per 2023 estimate, the department had a population of 613,262 inhabitants.

The department is an important agricultural region, particularly for the cultivation of coffee. Other agricultural produce include rice, maize, and tobacco. Other economic activity include cattle rearing, gold and silver mining, leather and furniture production. The department is also known for its handicrafts, and traditional markets.
