= Jinotega Department =

Department of Nicaragua

Coordinates: 13°05′00″N 86°00′00″W

Jinotega
- Department
- Flag Coat of arms

- Country: Nicaragua
- Capital: Jinotega

Area
  - Department: 9,222 km^{2} (3,561 sq mi)

Population (2021 estimate)
  - Department: 483,404
  - Density: 52.42/km^{2} (135.8/sq mi)
  - Urban: 119,770
- ISO 3166-2: NI-JI
- Website: http://www.alcaldiajinotega.gob.ni/

Jinotega (Spanish pronunciation: [xinoˈteɣa]) is a department of Nicaragua. Its departmental head is Jinotega. It is located in the north of the country, on the border with Honduras.

The Department of Jinotega has a population of 483,404 (2021 estimate) and covers an area of 9,222 km^{2}. It is one of the 15 most extensive departments in the country. Founded on October 15, 1891. In addition, Jinotega is home to various indigenous peoples, including the Cacaopera and the Nahua.

The city of Jinotega "Las Brumas" is the departmental capital of the homonymous department with an urban population of 53 265 inhabitants in the year 2017. It is located in a valley at an altitude of 1,003.87 meters above sea level with a cool climate at an average temperature of 25 °C and a distance of 142 km from Managua (2h 44 min, by Carr.Panamericana / Panamericana Nte./CA-1).

Source: National Institute for Development Information (INIDE) - Nicaragua. Statistical Yearbook 2016 - 18

The department generates its own power through Lake Apanás Dam, which is also a tourist attraction. Isabelia Mountain Range contains several cloud forests peaks and massifs such as Chimborazo (1,688 m), Datanlí Diablo (1,550 m) with "la Bujona" waterfall. Also, Penas Blancas Massif (1,700 m) containing several water drops, and Bosawás Biosphere Reserve, the largest biosphere reserve in Central America with about 22,000 km^{2}.

== Points of interest ==
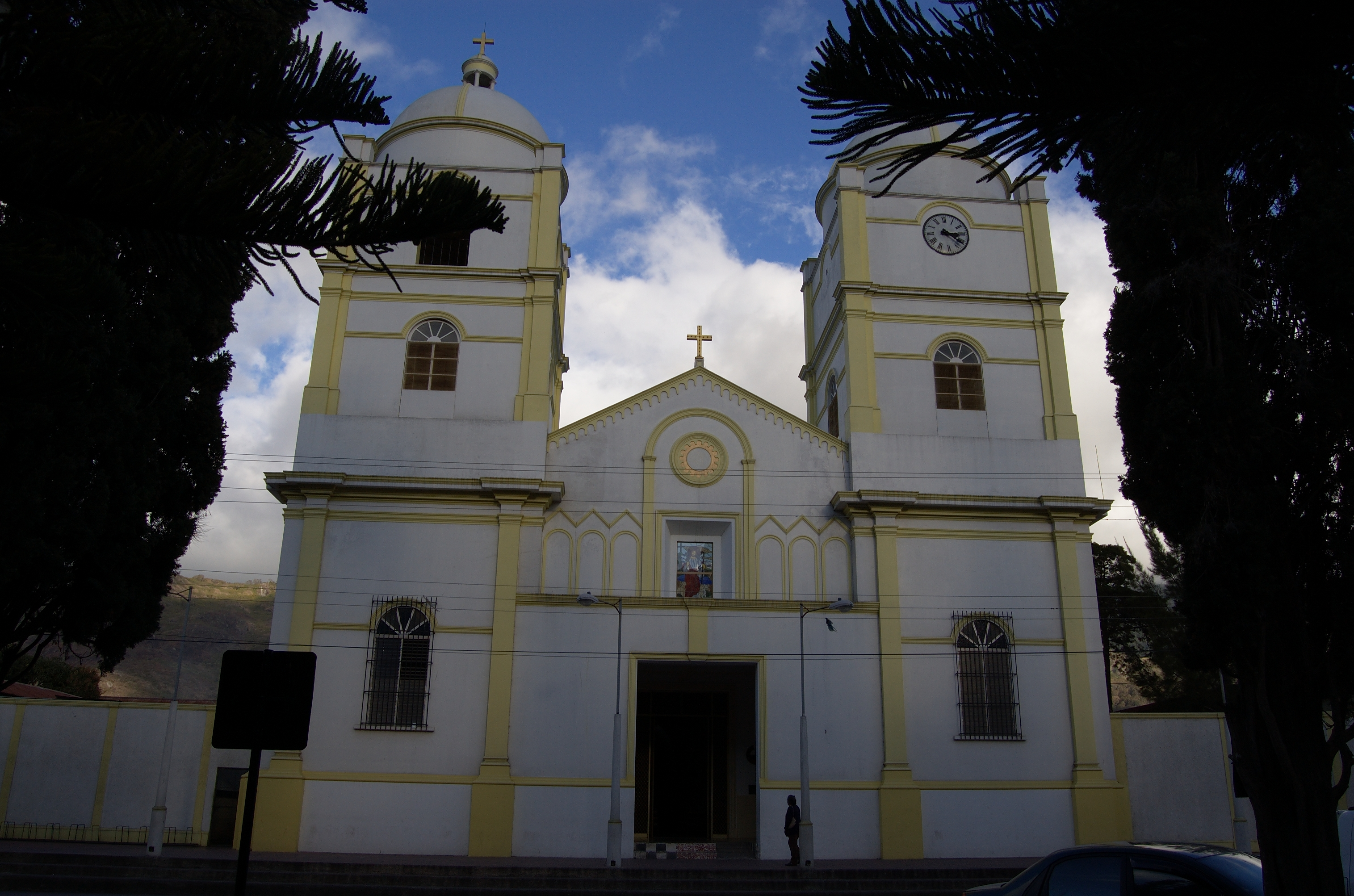
Catedral de San Juan

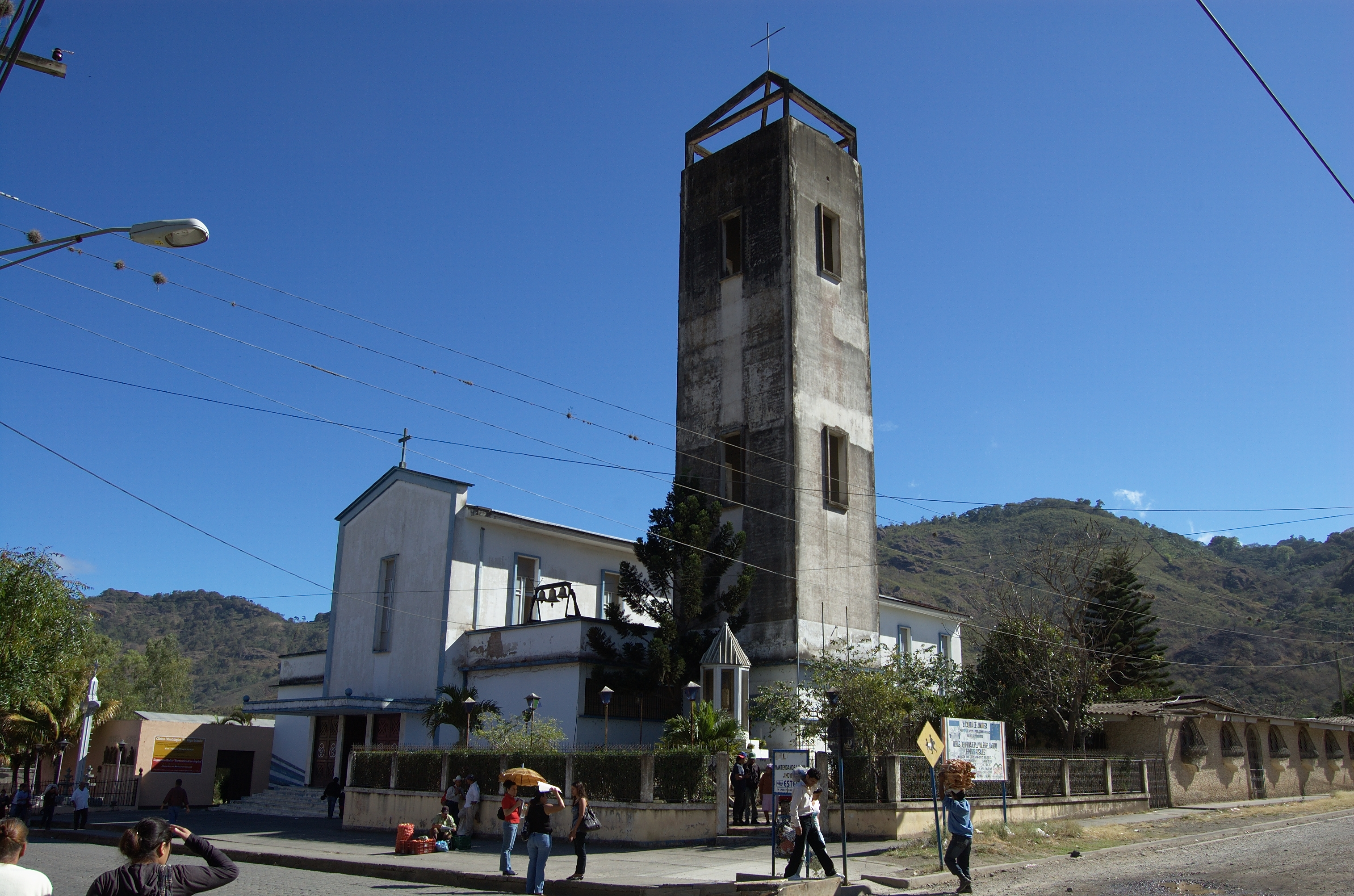
Nuestra Señora de los Angeles.

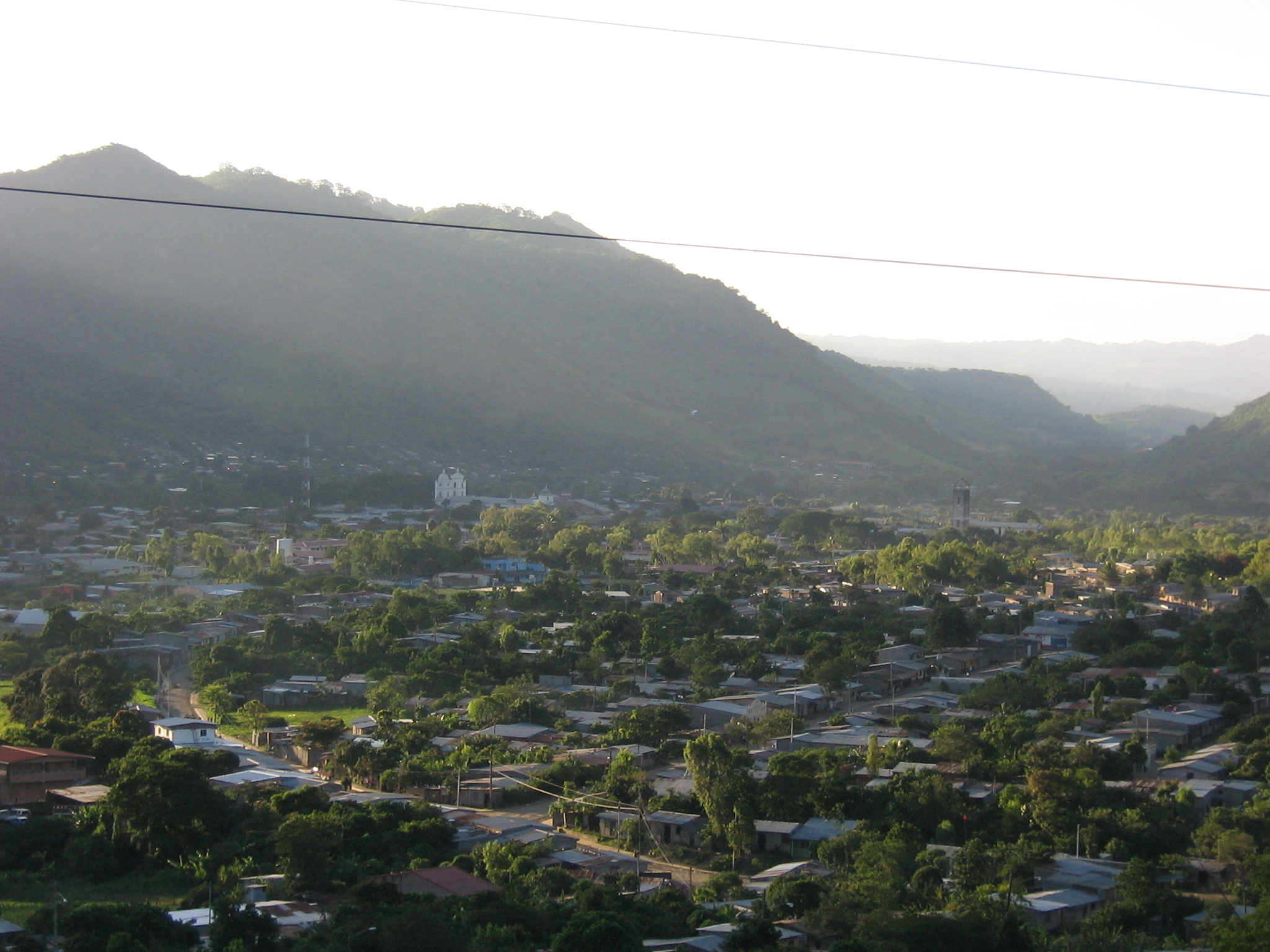
City of Jinotega

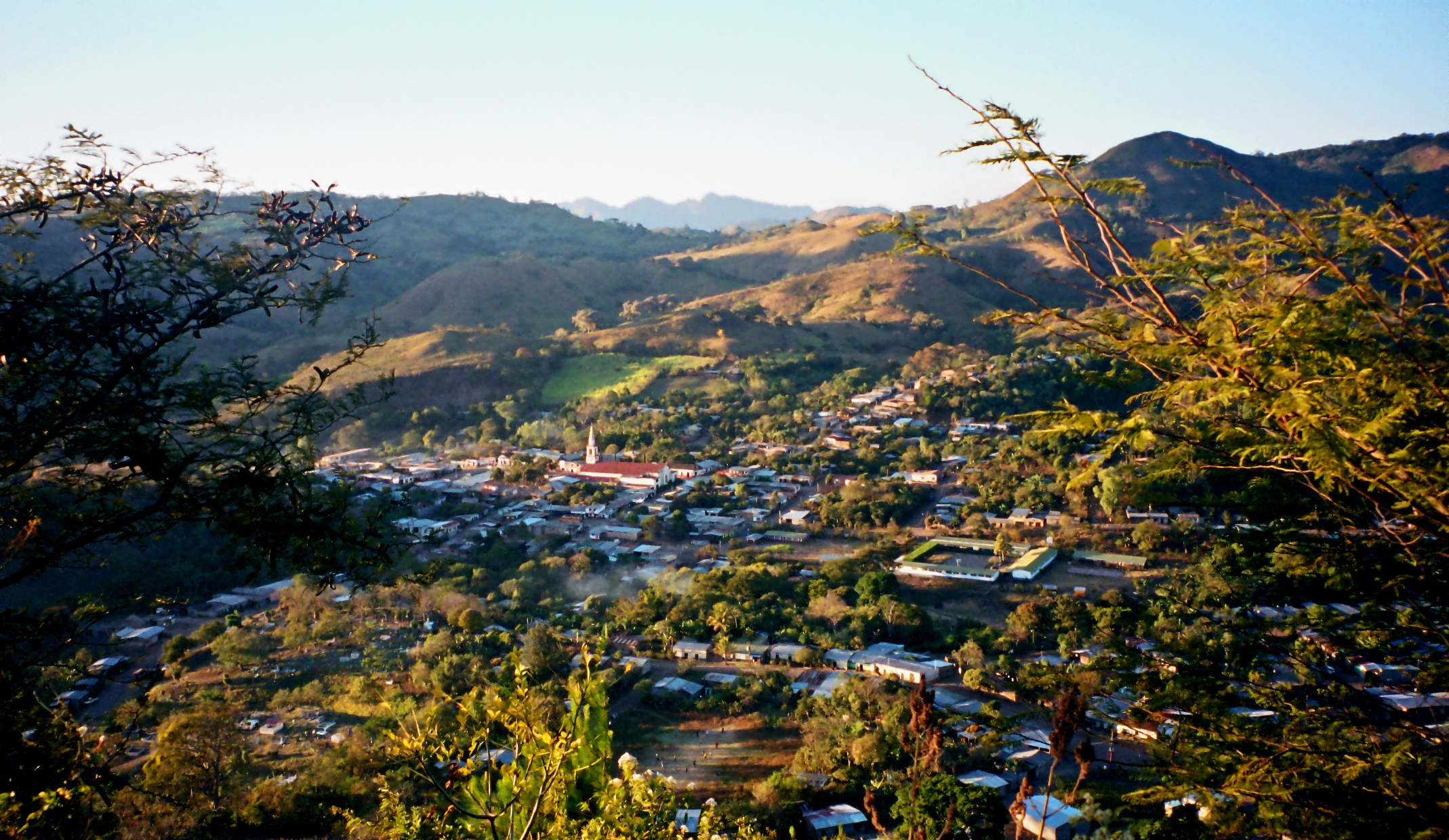
Vista de San Sebastian de Yali, Jinotega

There are various restaurants and markets throughout the department of Jinotega, that serve various fruits, vegetables, meats, and drinks. The city of Jinotega is in the vicinity of the artificial Lake Apanas. The town of San Rafael del Norte located about 20 minutes north of Jinotega City, was General Sandino's Headquarters against US Marine's forced occupation of Nicaragua in the late 1920s and early 1930s. San Rafael has a neoclassical parrish church across the leafy Main Square, and a small museum dedicated to Sandino and his wife, Blanca Aráuz.

== Attractions and places of interest ==
=== In the city of Jinotega ===
==== Museum and Library ====
- Museo Municipal, on north side of Central Plaza: it covers archeology, history and antiques displays.
- Biblioteca Municipal: within the same premises as the museum.

==== Temples and Parks ====
- San Juan Bautista Cathedral, on the city's Main Avenue has remarkable neoclassical interiors, a beautiful wooden retable and pulpit, delicate statuary and great views from the bell towers.
- Church of Our Lady of Angels, near La Salle College.
- Otto Casco Park: with a basketball court, near the bus station to Managua, and Victoria Motta Hospital.
- Central Park: a tree covered square with a fountain, a central gazebo for Christmas displays, skateboard tracks, and wifi connection. Surrounding the park are San Juan Cathedral, the Mayor's Office, the City Museum, the Public Library, the Social Club, UNAN (National Autonomous University of Nicaragua), and several hotels, and restaurants.

==== Panoramic Views of Jinotega ====
- Travel up the steps to the top of "Peña de la Cruz", the path of many pilgrims to fulfill promises to la Santa Cruz (Holy Cross).

=== In the municipalities of the department of Jinotega ===
==== Natural, historical and religious attractions ====
- Town of La Concordia, birthplace of General Benjamin Zeledon.
- Town of San Rafael del Norte, where General Augusto C. Sandino married telegraph operator Blanca Aráuz.
- Tepeyac Shrine in San Rafael del Norte, where "the Servant of God" Fray Odorico D'Andrea carried out several pastoral works and town improvements.
- Canopy tours of "La Brellera" on the outskirts of San Rafael del Norte, experiencing the sensation of "flying" on the trees.
- Visits to "El Jaguar" Nature Reserve.

=== Rural and community tourism experience ===
- Tours of "Datanlí - El Diablo" Natural Reserve to enjoy its cloud forests and "La Bujona" waterfall while guided by locals and sharing daily activities.
- Lodging at "La Bastille" Ecolodge.
- Farm holidays in Santa María de Pantasma.
- Ecotours at "La Fundadora" and "Vida Joven" farms located on the Jinotega - Matagalpa road.
- Natural and cultural experience.
- Visits to Bosawás, declared by UNESCO a Biosphere Reserve, and to "Peñas Blancas" Massif known for its white cliffs and sharp water drops among misty cloud forests.
- Nature tours among coffee fields in Mount Kilambé Nature Reserve, near the town of Wiwilí, and "Santa Maura" farm to learn about the cultivation of this grain called the "green gold".
- Visits to Volcan "Yalí" Nature Reserve.
- Adventure tourism on Lake Apanás where sport fishing activities and rowing boat competitions take place. This lake is a habitat for a great variety of lake flora and fauna.

== Municipalities ==
1. El Cuá
2. Jinotega
3. La Concordia
4. San José de Bocay
5. San Rafael del Norte
6. San Sebastián de Yalí
7. Santa María de Pantasma
8. Wiwilí de Jinotega
