= Bellezas Globales de Nicaragua =

National beauty pageant in Nicaragua

- Type: Women's beauty pageant
- Headquarters: Managua
- Country represented: Nicaragua
- Qualifies for: Miss World; Miss Supranational; Miss Cosmo; Miss International
- First edition: 2025
- Most recent edition: 2026
- Miss World Nicaragua: Belén Cáceres
- Miss Cosmo Nicaragua: Milagros López
- National Directors: Amarilis Soza; Roberto Ñurinda
- Language: Spanish
- Predecessor: Miss Mundo Nicaragua

Bellezas Globales de Nicaragua is a national beauty pageant in Nicaragua that selects the representatives for Nicaragua to compete at Miss World, Miss International, Miss Supranational and Miss Cosmo. Previously the organization franchise the Miss World Nicaragua under Denis Dávila directorship however beginning 2025 the new directors are Amarilis Soza and Roberto Ñurinda.

The first edition was held on March 23, 2025 at the Rubén Darío National Theatre where 25 delegates from different cities and departments of Nicaragua competed for the 4 titles and the end of the night 4 delegates where crowned.

== Titleholders ==
Below are the names of the annual titleholders of Bellezas Globales de Nicaragua, the states they represented and the venue which played host to their crowning, in ascending order. Titleholders whose names appear highlighted went on to win a major international pageant.

Year	Pageant	Winners	Venue	Entrants
2026	Miss World	Belén Cáceres		
2026	Miss Cosmo	Milagros López		
2025	Miss World	Virmania Rodríguez	Rubén Darío National Theatre, Managua, Nicaragua	24
2025	Miss International	Verónica Iglesias	Rubén Darío National Theatre, Managua, Nicaragua	24
2025	Miss Supranational	Maycrin Jáenz	Rubén Darío National Theatre, Managua, Nicaragua	24
2025	Miss Cosmo	Marian Rodríguez	Rubén Darío National Theatre, Managua, Nicaragua	24

== Representatives at major international pageants ==
=== Miss World ===
Declared as the winner
Ended as the runner-up
Ended as a finalist or semi-finalist

Year	Representative	State	Competition performance		
Year	Representative	State	Placements	Title/Award	Fast Track
2026	Belén Cáceres	Matagalpa	Unplaced		
2025	Virmania Rodríguez	León	Unplaced		Top 32 at Miss World Sport
Further information: Miss Mundo Nicaragua

=== Miss International ===
Declared as the winner
Ended as the runner-up
Ended as a finalist or semi-finalist

Year	Representative	State	Competition performance		
Year	Representative	State	Placements	Title/Award	Fast Track
2025	Verónica Iglesias	Granada	Top 10		
Further information: Miss International Nicaragua

=== Miss Supranational ===
Declared as the winner
Ended as the runner-up
Ended as a finalist or semi-finalist

Year	Representative	State	Competition performance		
Year	Representative	State	Placements	Title/Award	Fast Track
2025	Maycrin Jáenz	Granada	Unplaced		Top 9 at Miss Talent
Further information: Miss Supranational Nicaragua

=== Miss Cosmo ===
Declared as the winner
Ended as the runner-up
Ended as a finalist or semi-finalist

Year	Representative	State	Competition performance		
Year	Representative	State	Placements	Title/Award	Fast Track
2026	Milagros López	Managua	TBA		
2025	Marian Rodríguez	Rivas	Unplaced		Top 26 at Cosmo Impactful Beauty Award
2024	Julia Aguilar	Granada	Unplaced		
