= Nuestra Belleza Latina 2009 =

US television program

- Season 3
- Presented by: Giselle Blondet
- Judges: Osmel Sousa; Lupita Jones; Jorge Aravena
- Winner: Greidys Gil
- Runner-up: Marycarmen Lopez
- No. of episodes: 12

Release
- Original network: Univision
- Original release: March 1 – May 17, 2009

Season chronology
- ← Previous; Nuestra Belleza Latina 2008 Next → Nuestra Belleza Latina 2010

Nuestra Belleza Latina 2009 is the third season of Nuestra Belleza Latina premiered in March 2009. Auditions were once again held in five major US cities (Los Angeles, California; Dallas, Texas; Miami, Florida; Chicago, Illinois; and New York City, New York) and in San Juan, Puerto Rico. During the audition process, 75 young women were given passes to the semi-finals in Miami, Florida. With the twist of adding one more contestant named "La Intrusa" (Francheska Mattei). For several weeks, Francheska Mattei, a professional actress, posed as one of the contestants to know the rumors, secrets, and even gossip from the girls. The elimination process was quick, with 15 women leaving the first day, 40 on the second week, and finally 8 women were eliminated leaving the 12 finalists who will be moving into a Miami mansion where they will be living together for the rest of the competition. Each week, viewers will have a chance to vote for their favorite finalists. The three women with the fewest votes will then be in danger of being eliminated. However, two of the women in the bottom three will have the chance of being saved, one by her fellow finalists, and the other by the judges. This year they had an "Intrusa", the one that spilled the gossip about the contestants and it was Puerto Rican, Francheska Mattei.

Greidys Gil contestant representing Cuba won the competition.

== Changes ==
There were some mayor changes to this Season, Julian Gil left the show, and was replaced with Model/Actor Jorge Aravena. Osmel Sousa and Lupita Jones became the main Judges. Melissa Marty became a correspondent in the show, she went backstage and had a one-on-one with the girls during the Show and at the "Belleza House". The show moved from Tuesdays to Sundays at 8pm/7c. For the first time in Nuestra Belleza Latina history a girl was expelled. Contestant, Stephanie broke the main rule of Nuestra Belleza Latina of having contact with an outside member. The contestant was soon replaced by Chastelyn.

== Judges ==
- Osmel Sousa
- Lupita Jones
- Jorge Aravena

== Elimination chart ==
Contestants Chart
Top 12	Winner	1st Runner-Up

Safe	Won the challenge of the week	Bottom 3	Bottom 2	Eliminated

Stage:		Finals						
Week:		4/5	4/13	4/19	4/26	5/3	5/10	5/17
Place	Contestant	Result						Finale
1	Greydis Gil	Safe	Safe	Safe	Safe	Safe	Bottom 2	Winner
2	Marycarmen López	Safe	Safe	Safe	Safe	Safe	Safe	Runner-Up
3	Catalina López	Safe	Safe	Safe	Safe	Bottom 2	Safe	3rd Place
4	Mónica De León	Bottom 3	Safe	Safe	Bottom 3	Safe	Safe	4th Place
5	Janice Bencosme	Safe	Safe	Safe	Safe	Safe	Safe	5th Place
6	Berenice Guzmán	Bottom 2	Safe	Safe	Bottom 2	Safe	Bottom 3	6th Place
7	Monica Pastrana	Safe	Bottom 3	Safe	Safe	Bottom 3	7th Place	
8	Jennifer Andrade	Safe	Safe	Bottom 2	Safe	8th Place		
9	Chastelyn Rodriguez	Safe	Safe	Bottom 3	9th Place			
10	Susie De Los Santos	Safe	Bottom 2	10th Place				
11	Anna Valencia	Safe	11th Place					
12	Vanessa Lotero	12th Place						
13-14	Stephanie Figueroa	Elim						
13-14	Francheska Mattei	Elim						

== Contestants ==
=== Contestants ===
Rank	Contestant
Winner	Cuba – Greidys Gil
Runner-Up	Mexico – Marycarmen López
3rd Place	Ecuador – Catalina López
4th Place	Mexico – Mónica De León
5th Place	Dominican Republic – Janice Bencosme
6th Place	Mexico – Berenice Guzmán
7th Place	Puerto Rico – Monica Pastrana
8th Place	Honduras/Mexico - Jennifer Andrade
9th Place	Puerto Rico – Chastelyn Rodriguez
10th Place	Dominican Republic/Mexico – Susie De Los Santos
11th Place	Mexico – Anna Valencia
12th Place	Colombia – Vanessa Lotero
Top 20	Brazil – Eloisa Alves; Cuba – Lissette Rodriguez; Cuba – Elizabeth Robaina; Mexico – Maria Elena Anaya; Puerto Rico – Stephanie Figueroa (Disqualified); Puerto Rico – Francheska Mattei (The Mole); Venezuela – Michelle Justiniano

=== Disqualifications ===
- Stephanie Figueroa Puerto Rico - Disqualified during the first week of the series for seeing her boyfriend, which was against the competition rules of complete isolation from the outside world. Chastelyn Rodriguez replaced Stephanie.

== Countries Being Represented ==
CPW	Country	Position											Year Previously Won
		1	2	3	4	5	6	7(Finale)					Year Previously Won
check	Cuba	5th	2nd	2nd	2nd	2nd	2nd	2nd	3rd	1st	1st	Winner	2009
check	Mexico	1st	5th	5th	1st	5th	1st	4th	2nd	3rd	2nd	Runner-Up	2007
—	Ecuador	3rd	3rd	3rd	4th	1st	4th	1st	1st	2nd	3rd		None
—	Dominican Republic	4th	4th	4th	3rd	3rd	3rd	3rd	4th				None
check	Puerto Rico	2nd	1st	1st	5th	4th	5th						2008
—	Colombia	6th											None

- Winner
- Runner-Up
- Eliminated
- First Place
- CPW: Countries Previously won
- : Countries Previously won

== Season 3, Episode 1: Castings 2009 ==
Original Air Date—1 March 2009 The best of the auditions held in Los Angeles, Dallas, Puerto Rico, Chicago, New York and Miami.

The Guest Judges were:

Judge	Audition Place
Jorge Aravena	Chicago
Raul Brindis	Dallas
Eddie "Piolín" Sotelo	Los Angeles
Julian Gil	Miami
Kika Roca	New York City
Cynthia Olavarria	Puerto Rico

The following contestants were chosen:

Contestant	Audition Place
Berenice Guzmán	Chicago
Marycarmen López	Dallas
Mónica De León	Dallas
Catalina López	Los Angeles
Jennifer Andrade	Los Angeles
Anna Valencia	Los Angeles
Greidys Gil	Miami
Vanessa Lotero	Miami
Janice Bencosme	New York City
Susie De Los Santos	New York City
Chastelyn Rodriguez	New York City
Monica Pastrana	Puerto Rico
Stephanie Figueroa	Puerto Rico

== Season 3, Episode 2: The Envelopes ==
Original Air Date—8 March 2009 The 75 selected contestants arrive to Miami. 20 of them receive an envelope the very first day. 10 of them are eliminated.

== Season 3, Episode 3: The Coaches Eliminate ==
Original Air Date—15 March 2009 The Choreography, Diction and Runway coaches cut 15 more girls from the group. The remaining 50 girls have to show their best talent onstage. After the performance, the show judges eliminate another 10 contestants.

== Season 3, Episode 4: Group Task ==
Original Air Date—22 March 2009 The 41 remaining girls are divided in groups to perform onstage. Four groups have musical numbers and the other four acting scenes. At the end of the show, the judges eliminate 20 girls.

== Season 3, Episode 5: Revealing the Mole ==
Original Air Date—29 March 2009 The mole is revealed and the 20 remaining girls face the judges one more time to receive their final evaluation. 12 of them are named finalists and go to the next stage of the show. The rest of the girls are eliminated.

The Final 12 are Chosen:

Contestant	Country Representing
Vanessa Lotero	Colombia
Greydis Gil	Cuba
Janice Bencosme	Dominican Republic
Susie De Los Santos	Dominican Republic/Mexico
Catalina Lopez	Ecuador
Jennifer Andrade	Honduras/Mexico
Marycarmen Lopez	Mexico
Mónica De León	Mexico
Berenice Guzman	Mexico
Anna Valencia	Mexico
Monica Pastrana	Puerto Rico

Disqualified	Country Representing
Stephanie Figueroa	Puerto Rico

Replacement	Country Representing
Chastelyn Rodriguez	Puerto Rico

== Season 3, Episode 6: No Make-up Photoshoot ==
Original Air Date—5 April 2009 The 12 finalists move to the mansion, where they start training while they are tested every day. The first challenge of the season is a no-make up photo-shoot. The winner will appear in People en Español magazine (as part of the 50 most beautiful edition).

== Season 3, Episode 7: Hurricane Report ==
Original Air Date—12 April 2009 The 11 remaining girls have to endure the hardest challenge of the season, reporting on location while a Hurricane hits the city with winds up to 100 miles per hour.

== Season 3, Episode 8: The Rope Course ==
Original Air Date—19 April 2009 The 10 remaining girls have to compete in a challenging rope course, where they have to be the fastest and the smartest in order to win.

== Season 3, Episode 9: Tarantula Photo Shoot ==
Original Air Date—26 April 2009 The 9 remaining girls face another breathtaking challenge. They have to pose for a print ad with a live tarantula walking over their shoulders, hands and face.

== Season 3, Episode 10: Novela Scenes ==
Original Air Date—3 May 2009 The 8 remaining girls are paired to do a sequenced telenovela scene, live onstage. The three girls in danger of elimination answer questions while connected at a lie detector machine.

== Season 3, Episode 11: The Final Question ==
Original Air Date—10 May 2009 The 7 remaining girls face the judges to hear them read the crudest critiques the audience posted online. They are challenged to respond to those critics -live- as if they were part of an interview.

== Season 3, Episode 12: The Finale 2009 ==
Original Air Date—17 May 2009 The 6 finalists chosen by the popular vote hit the runway for the last time. Greidys Gil was crowned "Nuestra Belleza Latina 2009"

Winner: Greydis Gil

== Call-Out Order ==
Giselle's Call-Out Order
Order	Episodes											
Order	Top 12	1	2	3	4	5	6	7(Finale)				Top 2
1	Greydis	Berenice	Chastelyn	Chastelyn	Monica D.	Berenice	Berenice	Catalina	Catalina	Marycarmen	Greydis	Greydis
2	Marycarmen	Monica P.	Jennifer	Greydis	Monica P.	Marycarmen	Greydis	Greydis	Marycarmen	Greydis	Marycarmen	Marycarmen
3	Catalina	Monica D.	Monica P.	Monica D.	Jennifer	Catalina	Janice	Marycarmen	Greydis	Catalina	Catalina	
4	Monica D.	Jennifer	Greydis	Berenice	Marycarmen	Monica D.	Catalina	Janice	Monica D.	Monica D.		
5	Janice	Catalina	Marycarmen	Catalina	Greydis	Greydis	Monica D.	Monica D.	Janice			
6	Berenice	Susie	Monica D.	Janice	Berenice	Janice	Marycarmen	Berenice				
7	Monica P.	Janice	Catalina	Marycarmen	Janice	Monica P.	Monica P.					
8	Jennifer	Marycarmen	Janice	Monica P.	Catalina	Jennifer						
9	Stephanie	Anna	Berenice	Jennifer	Chastelyn							
10	Susie	Greydis	Susie	Susie								
11	Anna	Vannessa	Anna									
12	Vanessa	Chastelyn										
13	Francheska											

Color	Description	Used
	The contestant was eliminated	Week 1-7
	The contestant won the competition	Top 2
	The contestant won second place	Top 2
	The contestant was expelled by the panel	Top 12
	The contestant replaced the expelled Contestant	Week 1
	The mole (La Intrusa) A contestant who was put in by the producers	Top 12
	The contestant won the challenge of the week	Week 1-7
	The contestant won the challenge of the week but was eliminated	Week 4

== Contestants Notes ==
- Catalina Lopez competed in Miss Ecuador 2006 where she won. She later represented Ecuador at Miss Universe 2006 in Los Angeles. She didn't classified as semifinalist. Then she represented Ecuador at the Miss Continente Americano 2006, where she finished in the Top 6.
- Monica Pastrana competed in Miss Puerto Rico 2009 where she landed a spot in the Top 20. She represented Puerto Rico at Miss International 2009 in China and she was unplaced.
- | (Mexico) Jennifer Andrade is Miss Universe Honduras 2012 and will represent Honduras at Miss Universe 2012

== Winners ==
Preceded by Melissa Marty	Nuestra Belleza Latina 2009; Greydis Gil	Succeeded by Ana Patricia González
