= Miss Supranational Nicaragua =

National beauty pageant in Nicaragua

- Type: Women's beauty pageant
- Franchise holder: Bellezas Globales de Nicaragua
- Headquarters: Managua
- Country represented: Nicaragua
- Qualifies for: Miss Supranational
- First edition: 2013
- Most recent edition: 2025
- Executive Committee: Miss Supranational Nicaragua org
- Language: Spanish
- Website: www.instagram.com/misssupranationalnic

Miss Supranational Nicaragua formerly known as Miss Nicaragua Supranational is a national beauty pageant in Nicaragua that celebrates the beauty of women across the country. The pageant was formerly under the Miss Mundo Nicaragua organization just in 2013. Since 2014 until 2022 Nicaragua did not compete in the international pageant. When a new organization got the franchise for Nicaragua in Miss Supranational in 2023 the 1st runner-up of Miss Nicaragua 2021 Katherine Burgos was appointment to represent the country in Poland, however the organization cancelled the pageant and Denis Dávila from Miss Mundo Nicaragua get the franchise back.

In 2024 the Miss Supranational Nicaragua celebrates the first edition of the pageant including delegates from Managua, Jinotega, Chontales and others departments in the country.

== Titleholders ==
Year	Miss Nicaragua Supranational	State	Venue
2013	Alejandra Gross	Managua	Designated
No pageant between 2014 and 2022
2023	Katherine Burgos	Managua	Designated
2024	Elena Etienne	Chontales	January 13, 2024
2025	Maycrin Jáenz	Granada	March 23, 2025

== International representatives ==
=== Miss Supranational ===
- : Declared as winner
- : Ended as runner-up or top 5/6 qualification
- : Ended as one of the finalists or semifinalists
- : Ended as special awards winner

Year	Department	Miss Nicaragua	Placement at Miss Supranational	Special awards
2025	Granada	Maycrin Jáenz	Unplaced	Top 9 at Miss Talent
2024	Chontales	Elena Etienne	Unplaced	
2023	Managua	Katherine Burgos	Unplaced	Top 10 at Supra Chat 2023
Did not compete between 2014 and 2022
2013	Managua	Alejandra Gross	Unplaced	Best in National Costume

== See also ==
- Miss International Nicaragua
- Miss Mundo Nicaragua
