= Miss Nicaragua 2002 =

- Date: March 7, 2002
- Presenters: Oswaldo Quijano & Claudia Alaniz
- Venue: Teatro Nacional Rubén Darío, Managua, Nicaragua
- Broadcaster: Televicentro
- Entrants: 12
- Winner: Marianela Lacayo; Managua

The Miss Nicaragua 2002 pageant, was held on March 7, 2002 in Managua, after several weeks of events. At the conclusion of the final night of competition, Marianela Lacayo from Managua won the title. She represented Nicaragua at Miss Universe 2002 held in Puerto Rico but unplaced and also Miss International 2002 held in Tokyo, Japan where she was a semi-finalist. The rest of the finalists would enter different pageants.

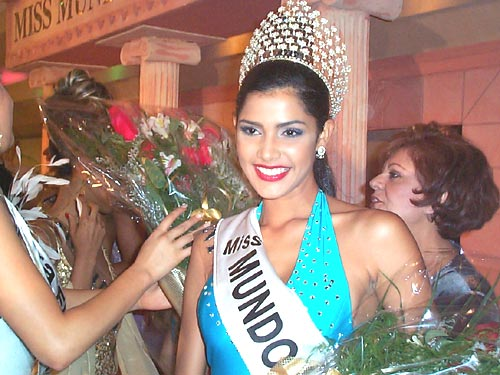
Marianela Lacayo in 2002.

== Placements ==
| Final Results | Contestant |
|---|---|
| Miss Nicaragua 2002 | Managua - Marianela Lacayo |
| Miss World Nicaragua 2002 | Leon - Hazel Calderon |
| Miss Earth Nicaragua 2002 | Carazo - Yahosca Cerda Urbina |
| Top 5 | Chinandega - Silvia Cristina Gonzalez; Madriz - Carmen Cabrera |

== Special awards ==
- Miss Photogenic - Chinandega - Silvia Cristina Gonzalez
- Miss Dorian Gray - Madriz - Carmen Cabrera
- Best Hair - Leon - Hazel Calderon
- Most Beautiful Face - Managua - Marianela Lacayo
- Miss Congeniality - Esteli - Yulissa Molina
- Miss Internet - Chinandega - Silvia Cristina Gonzalez (by votes of Global Beauties Webpage)

== Official Contestants ==
| State | Contestant |
|---|---|
| Achuapa | Arlen Mairena |
| Carazo | Yahosca Cerda Urbina |
| Chinandega | Silvia Cristina Gonzalez |
| Estelí | Yulissa Molina |
| Granada | Maria Auxiliadora Diaz |
| Jinotepe | Maria Fernanda Samqui |
| Leon | Hazel Calderon |
| Madriz | Carmen Cabrera |
| Managua | Marianela Lacayo |
| Nueva Segovia | Cynthia Valle |
| Rivas | Flavia Bravo |
| Tipitapa | Marissa Schwartz |

== Judges ==
- Leda Sanchez, Vice President of National Tourism Institute
- Magdalena Ponce de Leon, Executive Editor of FEM Magazine
- Maria Lilly Delgado, News Director of Televicentro
- Beatriz Obregón, Miss Nicaragua 1977
- Mario Solano, Regional Manager of Copa Airlines
- Marcio Telleria, MBA from University of Minnesota, Carlson School of Management
- Roxana Waid de Mantica, Executive Producer of Video-Arte Productions S.A
