= Nuestra Belleza Latina 2010 =

- Season 4
- Presented by: Giselle Blondet
- Judges: Osmel Sousa; Lupita Jones; Julián Gil
- Winner: Ana Patricia González
- Runner-up: Carolina Ramirez
- No. of episodes: 13

Release
- Original network: Univision
- Original release: March 9 – May 23, 2010

Season chronology
- ← Previous; Nuestra Belleza Latina 2009 Next → Nuestra Belleza Latina 2011

Nuestra Belleza Latina 2010 is the fourth season of Nuestra Belleza Latina. The season premiered on Univision Tuesday March 9, 2010 at 10pm/9c. It had been speculated that the show was moving to Tuesdays as its original time. The show will continue Sundays at 8pm/7c.

The auditions were shown Tuesday, March 9 and Thursday March 11 10pm/9c. Auditions were once again held in five major US cities (Los Angeles, California; Dallas, Texas; Miami, Florida; Chicago, Illinois; and New York City, New York) and in San Juan, Puerto Rico. During the audition process, 73 young women were given passes to the semi-finals in Miami. The final two tickets were given after an online voting took place February 26, 2010. Julian Gil, which was also the third judge in Nuestra Belleza Latina 2008 replaced previous Judge Jorge Aravena from Nuestra Belleza Latina 2009.

The winner of the contest wins a contract to be one of the new personality faces on many of Univision's programs and award shows, and a chance to win more than $250,000 in cash and prizes and reign as Nuestra Belleza Latina 2010 for a year.

Contestant Ana Patricia González Representing Mexico, won the Competition. She is the second contestant representing Mexico who has won the competition. First being Alejandra Espinoza in 2007

== Changes ==
It is now a tradition to have a different third male judge each season. With the replacement of Jorge Aravena from Nuestra Belleza Latina 2009, Season 4 male judge is Julian Gil, which was also the third judge in Nuestra Belleza Latina 2008. Season 4 of Nuestra Belleza Latina, the fourth judge was the audience. For the first time, online voting will define two seats left vacant to go to Miami. The 10 beauties auditioned but failed to convince the judges. The voting ended 26 February at midnight. Winner Greydis Gil from Nuestra Belleza Latina, gave a sneak preview of the new changes that will be made to the show. Each girl that wins a challenge will win $10,000. Finally in the main opening of the show, the three previous winners of Nuestra Belleza Latina will be shown.

== Judges ==
- Osmel Sousa
- Lupita Jones
- Julián Gil

== Contestants ==
| Rank | Contestant |
|---|---|
| Winner | Mexico – Ana Patricia González |
| Runner-Up | Colombia – Carolina Ramírez |
| 3rd place | Puerto Rico – Tatiana Delgado |
| 4th place | Venezuela – Bárbara Moros |
| 5th place | Cuba – Lisandra De La Cruz |
| 6th place | Dominican Republic – Fabiola Barinas |
| 7th place | Honduras – Heidy Alvarado |
| 8th place | Dominican Republic – Rossibell Mateo |
| 9th place | Mexico – Mayra Zavala |
| 10th place | Mexico – Cynthia Piña |
| 11th place | Nicaragua – Indiana Sánchez |
| 12th place | Argentina – Agostina Fusari |
| Top 20 | Colombia – Laura Sierra; Mexico – Sarah López; Nicaragua – Melissa Santos; Panama – Maricely González; Puerto Rico – Gredmarie Colón; Puerto Rico – Chanty Vargas; Puerto Rico – Anisha Montalvo; Venezuela – Kasandra Cruz |

== Elimination Chart ==
Contestants Chart
| Top 20 | Top 12 | Winner | 1st runner-up |

| Safe | Won the challenge of the week | Bottom 3 | Bottom 2 | Bottom 3/ Won the challenge of the week | Eliminated |

| Stage: | | Semi-finals | Finals | | | | | | Finale |
| Week: | | 4/4 | 4/11 | 4/18 | 4/25 | 5/2 | 5/9 | 5/16 | 5/23 |
| Place | Contestant | Result | | | | | | | |
| 1 | Ana Patricia González | Won | Safe | Safe | Won | Safe | Safe | Safe | Winner |
| 2 | Carolina Ramírez | Safe | Safe | Bottom 2 | Bottom 3 | Safe | Bottom 3 | Safe | Runner-Up |
| 3 | Tatiana Delgado | Safe | Safe | Safe | Safe | Safe | Safe | Safe | 3rd Place |
| 4 | Bárbara Moros | Safe | Bottom 2 | Safe | Safe | Bottom 3 | Safe | Bottom 2 | 4th Place |
| 5 | Lisandra de la Cruz | Safe | Safe | Won | Safe | Safe | Safe | Bottom 3 | 5th Place |
| 6 | Fabiola Barinas | Safe | Safe | Safe | Safe | Bottom 2 | Bottom 2 | Safe | 6th Place |
| 7 | Heidy Alvarado | Safe | Won | Safe | Safe | Safe | Safe | 7th Place | |
| 8 | Rossibell Mateo | Safe | Safe | Safe | Bottom 2 | Safe | 8th Place | | |
| 9 | Mayra Zavala | Safe | Safe | Bottom 3 | Safe | 9th Place | | | |
| 10 | Cynthia Piña | Safe | Bottom 3 | Safe | 10th Place | | | | |
| 11 | Indiana Sanchez | Safe | Safe | 11th Place | | | | | |
| 12 | Agostina Fusari | Safe | 12th Place | | | | | | |
| 13-20 | Chanty Vargas | Elim | | | | | | | |
| 13-20 | Anysha Montalvo | Elim | | | | | | | |
| 13-20 | Melissa Santos | Elim | | | | | | | |
| 13-20 | Maricely González | Elim | | | | | | | |
| 13-20 | Sarah López | Elim | | | | | | | |
| 13-20 | Gredmarie Colón | Elim | | | | | | | |
| 13-20 | Laura Sierra | Elim | | | | | | | |
| 13-20 | Kassandra Cruz | Elim | | | | | | | |

== Countries being represented ==
| CPW | Country | Position | | | | | | | | | | | Year previously won |
| | | 1 | 2 | 3 | 4 | 5 | 6 | 7 (Finale) | | | | | Year previously won |
|---|---|---|---|---|---|---|---|---|---|---|---|---|---|
| check | Mexico | 5th | 1st | 7th | 7th | 5th | 2nd | 1st | 1st | 1st | 1st | Winner | 2007 and 2010 |
| — | Colombia | 2nd | 7th | 6th | 5th | 6th | 1st | 5th | 3rd | 2nd | 2nd | 2nd | None |
| check | Puerto Rico | 3rd | 6th | 1st | 3rd | 2nd | 3rd | 3rd | 4th | 3rd | 3rd | | 2008 |
| — | Venezuela | 8th | 2nd | 4th | 6th | 3rd | 6th | 4th | 2nd | 4th | | | None |
| check | Cuba | 6th | 3rd | 4th | 4th | 1st | 2nd | 5th | 5th | | | | 2009 |
| — | Dominican Republic | 4th | 4th | 2nd | 1st | 7th | 4th | 6th | | | | | None |
| — | Honduras | 7th | 5th | 5th | 2nd | 4th | 7th | | | | | | None |
| — | Nicaragua | 1st | 8th | | | | | | | | | | None |
| — | Argentina | 9th | | | | | | | | | | | None |

- Eliminated
- First place
- Winner
- Runner-up
- CPW: Countries previously won
- : Countries previously won

== You're the 4th Judge ==
In this new season of Nuestra Belleza Latina, you are the fourth judge. For the first time, online voting will decide two seats left vacant to go to Miami. The 10 beauties auditioned but failed to convince the judges. The voting ended 26 February at midnight.

Top 10:

| Contestant | Age | Audition Place | Eliminated |
|---|---|---|---|
| Alexandra Santos | 18 | Puerto Rico | 3/14/2010 |
| Anna Mancilla | 24 | Chicago | Chosen |
| Celeste Santana | 26 | Los Angeles | 3/11/2010 |
| Gabriella Castillo | 23 | Houston | 3/14/2010 |
| Ivette Gutierrez | 19 | Miami | 3/11/2010 |
| Jeidy Garcia | 26 | New York City | 3/11/2010 |
| Lisandra De La Cruz | 23 | Miami | Chosen |
| Mey-Lhin Sheldon | 25 | Los Angeles | 3/11/2010 |
| Neisy Núñez | 22 | New York City | 3/11/2010 |
| Norma Lozana | 22 | Houston | 3/14/2010 |

Girls Chosen(03/14/10):

| | Contestant | Age | Audition Place |
|---|---|---|---|
| 1 | Lisandra de la Cruz | 23 | Miami |
| 2 | Anna Mancilla | 24 | Chicago |

== Episodes ==
=== Season 4, Episode 1: Casting in Los Angeles, Puerto Rico, and Miami ===
Original Air Date – 9 March 2010

The best of the auditions held in Los Angeles, Puerto Rico, and Miami.

The Guest Judges were:

| Judge | Audition Place |
|---|---|
| Eddie 'Piolin' Sotelo | Los Angeles |
| Jackie Guerrido | Puerto Rico |
| Angélica Vale (Day 1) | Miami |
| Tony Andrade (Day 2) | Miami |

The following contestants were chosen:

| Contestant | Audition Place |
|---|---|
| Mayra Zavala | Los Angeles |
| Suany Serpas | Los Angeles |
| Karely Saldivar | Los Angeles |
| Dulce Vera | Los Angeles |
| Cynthia Piña | Los Angeles |
| Cindy Stevenson | Los Angeles |
| Fabiola Barinas | Los Angeles |
| Ana Patricia Gonzalez | Los Angeles |
| Sarah Lopez | Los Angeles |
| Agostina Fusari | Los Angeles |
| Melissa Santos | Los Angeles |
| Alissa Costa | Puerto Rico |
| Chanty Vargas | Puerto Rico |
| Anysha Montalvo | Puerto Rico |
| Tatiana Delgado | Puerto Rico |
| Zailyn Guiterrez | Puerto Rico |
| Gredmarie Colon | Puerto Rico |
| Jessica Santiago | Puerto Rico |
| Luz Diaz | Puerto Rico |
| Nichole Cordona | Puerto Rico |
| Jannette Chiszar | Miami |
| Indiana Sánchez | Miami |
| Natalie Arias | Miami |
| Carolina Ramirez | Miami |
| Barbara Moros | Miami |
| Lissandra de la Cruz | Miami |

=== Season 4, Episode 2: The Auditions Continue ===
Original Air Date – 11 March 2010

The best of the auditions held in Chicago, New York and Houston And the first five eliminees from the internet voting.

The Guest Judges were:

| Judge | Audition Place |
|---|---|
| DJ Traviezo | Chicago |
| Frederick Martinez | New York City |
| Raul Brindis | Houston |

The following contestants were chosen:

| Contestant | Audition Place |
|---|---|
| Maliani Correa | Chicago |
| Aydee Castañeda | Chicago |
| Heydi Alvadaro | Chicago |
| Kassandra Cruz | New York |
| Yoraida Mejia | New York |
| Rosibell Mateo | New York |
| Yuleiky Mena | New York |
| April Aguirre | Houston |
| Judy Tanguma | Houston |
| Laura Sierra | Houston |
| Maricely Gonzalez | Houston |

=== Season 4, Episode 3: The 75 Go to Miami ===
Original Air Date – 14 March 2010

The 75 selected girls go to Miami. They receive classes and hit the runway for the first time. The judges eliminate 15 of them. The two internet contestants from the public votes will are revealed.

Online Contestants Chosen:

| | Contestant | Age | Audition Place |
|---|---|---|---|
| 1 | Lisandra de la Cruz | 23 | Miami |
| 2 | Anna Mancilla | 24 | Chicago |

=== Season 4, Episode 4: Top 35 ===
Original Air Date – 21 March 2010

The 57 remaining girls are divided in groups to perform onstage. Four groups have musical numbers and the other four acting scenes. At the end of the show, the judges eliminate 22 girls, Leaving 35. It is revealed that five contestants will be chosen to move in the Belleza House.

=== Season 4, Episode 5: The Top 20 have been Chosen ===
Original Air Date – 28 March 2010

The 35 remaining girls face the judges one more time to receive their final evaluation. 5 of them are named finalists and go to the next stage of the show. This does not mean that they will be moving into the Belleza Masion. This means they are the Judges favorite and they have bigger chances in making it to the final 12 and moving into the Belleza Mansion. At elimination 15 girls are eliminated.

Top 20 Semi-finalists:

| Contestant | Country Representing | Auditioned |
|---|---|---|
| Ana Patricia González | Mexico | Los Angeles |
| Bárbara Moros | Venezuela | Miami |
| Tatiana Delgado | Puerto Rico | Puerto Rico |
| Sarah López | Mexico | Los Angeles |
| Laura Sierra | Colombia | Houston |
| Carolina Ramírez | Colombia | Miami |
| Agostina Fusari | Argentina | Los Angeles |
| Indiana Sánchez | Nicaragua | Miami |
| Fabiola Barinas | Dominican Republic | Los Angeles |
| Kassandra Cruz | Venezuela | New York |
| Melissa Santos | Nicaragua | Los Angeles |
| Rossibell Mateo | Dominican Republic | New York |
| Anysha Montalvo | Puerto Rico | Puerto Rico |
| Chanty Vargas | Puerto Rico | Puerto Rico |
| Heidy Alvarado | Honduras | Chicago |
| Cynthia Piña | Mexico | Houston |
| Mayra Zavala | Mexico | Los Angeles |
| Maricely González | Panama | Miami |
| Gredmarie Colón | Puerto Rico | Puerto Rico |
| Lissandra de la Cruz | Cuba | Miami |

- The Judges favorites having bigger chances in making it to the final 12.
- Guest Artist: Carlos Baute

=== Season 4, Episode 6: And the Top Twelve are... ===
Original Air Date – 4 April 2010

The remaining 20 girls show themselves for the last time in front of the judges. Only 12 continue in the hopes of becoming Nuestra Belleza Latina.

Top 12 are Chosen:

| # | Contestant | Age | Country Representing | Auditioned |
|---|---|---|---|---|
| 63 | Mayra Zavala | 23 | Mexico | Los Angeles |
| 54 | Rossibell Mateo | 21 | Dominican Republic | New York |
| 19 | Heidy Alvarado | 19 | Honduras | Chicago |
| 22 | Agostina Fusari | 25 | Argentina | Los Angeles |
| 18 | Tatiana Delgado | 21 | Puerto Rico | Puerto Rico |
| 33 | Cynthia Piña | 26 | Mexico | Houston |
| 59 | Bárbara Moros | 23 | Venezuela | Miami |
| 48 | Indiana Sánchez | 22 | Nicaragua | Miami |
| 75 | Lissandra de la Cruz | 23 | Cuba | Miami |
| 37 | Carolina Ramírez | 26 | Colombia | Miami |
| 70 | Fabiola Barinas | 25 | Dominican Republic | Los Angeles |
| 4 | Ana Patricia González | 22 | Mexico | Los Angeles |

- Guest Artist: David Bisbal
- Eliminated: Laura Sierra, Kassandra Cruz, Gredmarie Colón, Maricely González, Sarah López, Melissa Santos, Anysha Montalvo, Chanty Vargas

=== Season 4, Episode 7: Moving into the Mansion ===
Original Air Date – 11 April 2010 The top 12 contestants move into the Belleza Mansion. They have their first official challenge. Conflicts emerge in the first week. Barbara Moros, gets attacked at confessions for having an attitude. Cynthia Piña, is the first to be put in the bottom three, following Agostina Fusari for her lack of confidence and Barbara Moros for having a low score on the viewers vote. In the Mini Challenge the bottom three girls are given a minute to change wardrobe and have an interview with fashion expert Rodner Figueroa. Barbara Moros gets praised for her confidence while Agostina is criticized for confusing journalist, Neyda Sandoval for a "Famous Person" This year they changed the competition, previous years the fellow contestants decided on who they wanted to keep. This year the girls had to pick who they wanted to be in bottom two. Heidy for being the challenge winner had the opportunity to double her vote against a fellow contestant. With 7 votes Barbara Moros was sent to the Judges. Cynthia was saved for having more viewers votes than Agostina. Barbara Moros with seven votes and Agostina with three, confronted the judges. Judges were shocked and were uncertain on whom to eliminate. Barbara was critiqued for having maybe a tough attitude with fellow contestants, while Agostina was criticized for having to be too soft, and needed a more tough attitude. Agostina Fusari, contestant representing Argentina was the first to be eliminated.

- Challenge of the week winner: Heidy Alvarado
- Guest Artist: Chino & Nacho and Fedro
- Mini-Challenge Guest: Rodner Figueroa
- First Call-Out (At the Final Runway):Indiana Sánchez
- Bottom Three:Cynthia Piña, Bárbara Moros, Agostina Fusari
- Sent to bottom two by fellow Contestants: Bárbara Moros
- Saved by the viewer votes: Cynthia Piña
- Saved by the Judges: Bárbara Moros
- Eliminated: Agostina Fusari

=== Season 4, Episode 8: Water, Fire, and Beauty... ===
Original Air Date – 18 April 2010

The second week of competition was full of water, fire, intrigue and friction between the girls. The week's challenge was to surf mechanical waves that almost drowned the girls and left more than one without clothes. Judges, Jose Fernandez and Claudia Molina, chose Lisandra as the best, consequently she won the challenge. The Cuban took 10 thousand dollars as a prize. After the challenge the contestants had an activity in which they reported a story in front of a truck that was burning in flames. Fabiola was the one who best made the test and therefore had the opportunity to make a lightning trip to participate in several radio and television programs' locales. The special guests consisted of the Puerto Rican duo Angel & Khriz who performed on stage the song "Ayer La Vi". Giselle gave the results of the voting public and the three fewest votes were: Indiana, Carolina and Mayra. They had to face a challenge to live next door to Raul de Molina which was to submit an audition to be the co-host for a new travel program called "The Fat and the beautiful." The girls had a minute and a half to talk about a country, but Raúl De Molina had a mission to not let them talk. The moment of truth came and the girls faced their companions. Those that were safe voted to eliminate one of those that were in danger and Indiana was the less fortunate, having received seven votes against and, next to Carolina, she had to face the judges. Osmel had no hesitation in saying that this year was the season of 'the living' because the last two times have left them standing outside the girls show's strongest competition. Carolina and Indiana had to step out competition for iron judge which was an unfair decision. But in the show the judges could only give another chance to one of them and this time, Carolina was the lucky one, while for Indiana it was the end of the competition.

- Challenge of the week winner: Lissandra de la Cruz
- Guest Artist: Angel & Khriz
- Mini-Challenge Guest: Raúl De Molina
- First Call-Out (At the Final Runway): Cynthia Piña
- Bottom Three:Indiana Sánchez, Carolina Ramírez, Mayra Zavala
- Sent to bottom two by fellow Contestants: Indiana Sánchez
- Saved by the viewer votes: Mayra Zavala
- Saved by the Judges: Carolina Ramírez
- Eliminated: Indiana Sánchez

=== Season 4, Episode 9: Extreme Beauty... ===
Original Air Date – 25 April 2010

Zone D'Tambora The group opened the show of Nuestra Belleza Latina with its theme as the beautiful Candy danced to the rhythm of the Puerto Rican boom boom. Although the night started sweet, competition was tough, especially for Cynthia Pina who had to leave the show. Last week was full of challenges, Jose Fernandez had an idea and Claudia Molina agreed to test to condition the girls to an extreme physical military training, led by the U.S. Army sergeants which were demanding exercises. The nightmare began at five in the morning when the soldiers arrived at the mansion and the girls woke up screaming, then mounted on trucks and faced a test of obstacles.

Were physical trainers to support their pupils, who in teams had to jump, run and pass by a dirt road. In the end, the team that won was Claudia's team while two of the other girls finished in Joseph emergency room. Lisandra injured her arm and Barbara had a sprain in one of her ankles. The other challenge of the week was no less challenging than the last. The girls were divided into three groups and faced a test in the middle of nature. The competition pitted contestants against their own fears, as some have a phobia of water or even swim. The first part was a foot race, to get to the beach, fine rowed in a boat and had to pick, at sea, a few pieces to a puzzle. The yellow team formed by Tatiana, Fabiola and Ana Patricia, was the winner and award was $10,000. It was not all sweat and tears. The girls had a day with a makeup expert who gave a talk and many tips to learn how to highlight their beauty. Finally, the girls were rewarded with a photographic portfolio for each. The makeup room, Greidys interviewed the group Camila, who later took the stage to perform her new single . Giselle started giving the results of the public vote but before the girls had to answered questions and hear good and bad criticism of the followers of the show. This week, the girls in danger of being eliminated were Cynthia, Rossibell Carolina and who had to face a challenge to live next door to Don Francisco. The test consisted of presenting a cereal bar called cerealísimo in a television show called Domingo Gigante. For Don Francisco, the best proof he was Cynthia. The moment of truth came and the girls in danger faced by a vote of their peers. This time, Carolina had the opportunity to stay in the competition and Cynthia and Rossibell faced before the judges. This time, the judges saved Rossibell and Cynthia Pina was eliminated.

- Challenge of the week winner: Ana Patricia González
- Guest Artist: Camila and Zone D' Tambora
- Mini-Challenge Guest: Don Francisco
- First Call-Out (At the Final Runway): Tatiana Delgado
- Bottom Three: Cynthia Piña, Rossibell Mateo, Carolina Ramirez
- Sent to bottom two by fellow Contestants: Rossibell Mateo
- Saved by the viewer votes: Carolina Ramirez
- Saved by the Judges: Rossibell Mateo
- Eliminated: Cynthia Piña

=== Season 4, Episode 10: The Girl Who Pleads Forgiveness... ===
Original Air Date – 2 May 2010

Galactic costumes, beautiful show opened Nuestra Belleza Latina dancing My Rave Anahí. It was a night of suspense in which the challenges were present and where Mayra Zavala said goodbye to the competition. The challenge of the week consisted of a triathlon, with an additional ingredient. In one way, the fine had to change clothes and the last two to get to the end of the test were eliminated. In the first part, the fine ran a mile. The test was so hard that Fabiola surrendered and was disqualified. Lisandra, being the last to finish the test, was also outside. After changing his clothes, fine riding a bicycle. In this part of the test, wound and Carolina ended Rossibell eliminated art come to the finish. By the end of the triathlon, were fine bathing suit and had to get the ocean. Heidy and Mayra were disqualified and Barbara, Tatiana and Ana Patricia, the first three to complete the test, had the opportunity to take a picture to represent the word fresh. The winner of the challenge was why Barbara and took $10,000 in cash. Some time ago, Julián Gil rum made a calendar to present a challenge in vivo consisted of presenting the news alongside Maria Elena Salinas. After the challenge, the girls were saved voted to eliminate one of their partners at risk. After a triple tie, Barbara had the opportunity to stay in the competition and Mayra, next Fabiola, clashed with the judges, but as the judges had to save one of them, this time supported Mayra Fabiola and the end came.

- Challenge of the week winner: Barbara Moros
- Guest Artist: Anahí and Luis Fonsi
- Mini-Challenge Guest: Maria Elena Salinas
- First Call-Out (At the Final Runway): Rossibell Mateo
- Bottom Three: Bárbara Moros, Mayra Zavala and Fabiola Barinas
- Sent to bottom two by fellow Contestants: Bárbara Moros, Mayra Zavala and Fabiola Barinas
- Saved by the viewer votes: Bárbara Moros
- Saved by the Judges: Fabiola Barinas
- Eliminated: Mayra Zavala

=== Season 4, Episode 11: The Tribute to Mother's Day ===
Original Air Date – 9 May 2010

The Nuestra Belleza Latina gala began with a dance to the rhythm of the music of Untouchables and Ay Ojitos after giving way to the challenges and activities put on edge and which did not work out librada. El Rossibell Challenge weeks was to walk like models on the catwalk after choosing two outfits from the collection of designer Rene Ruiz dresses, one for day and one for the night. Additionally the fine had to make up, themselves, and transform that makeup when Night. costumes paraded middle of the runway, facing the audience and the cameras, Rossibell and Barbara had their trips. The top three in this challenge were Carolina, and Ana Patricia Lisandra but it was the Colombian who won and took, as a reward 10 000 dólares. Esta week, faced a fine activity that tested their talent as actors, Scenes that made honor Mother's Day. Backstage Greidys Gil, Nuestra Belleza Latina 2009, spoke to Flex who later took the stage to sing alongside Ricky Rick, kisses Amor. Según the public vote, girls with fewer votes were in danger of being eliminated and they were: Carolina, Rossibell and Fabiola. Live for the challenge, the special guest was Paul Ramirez, La Torre de Jalisco, who put the girls to suffer with teams participating in the World Cup. They had to memorize the teams that will participate in the World and place the corresponding group countries. The fine did not go well rid of this test and then had to face the vote of their peers. The girls voted to safely eliminate one of her companions. With three votes against, Rossibell remained in the hands of judges, next to Fabiola, while Carolina remained safe. The judges, after analyzing the two girls who were in front, they decided to save Fabiola and therefore, Rossibell out of competition. Marking next week as the semifinals.

- Challenge of the week winner: Carolina Ramirez
- Guest Artist: Flex and Ricky Rick
- Mini-Challenge Guest: Pablo Ramírez
- First Call-Out (At the Final Runway): Lissandra de la Cruz
- Bottom Three: Carolina Ramirez, Rossibell Mateo, Fabiola Barinas
- Sent to bottom two by fellow Contestants: Rossibell Mateo
- Saved by the viewer votes: Carolina Ramirez
- Saved by the Judges: Fabiola Barinas
- Eliminated: Rossibell Mateo

=== Season 4, Episode 12: The Final Question... ===
Original Air Date – 16 May 2010

The 7 remaining contestants continue the competition. The girls face the hardest and harshest critiques yet. At eliminations one of the Girls is eliminated. After stiff competition, knew the names of the six finalists for Nuestra Belleza Latina that next week we go after the crown, $250,000 and an exclusive contract with the Univision Network. The passion of the world came to Nuestra Belleza Latina and pace of a "batucada" live "the beautiful dancing to celebrate the grand sports event of the 2010 Soccer World Cup.The challenge of the week, the fine had to become experts in oral hygiene. For that, Myrka Dellanos gave a talk and then, next to Karla Martínez, report on the benefits of cleaning your teeth. The task was not easy, the girls had to read the teleprompter, follow directions through the pointer and interact with the host of Despierta America. According to Myrka, Karla and diction teacher, Lisandra, Barbara and Heidi were the ones that made the test better, but it was Venezuela which took the prize of $10. The music of the night was in charge of the creators of Pasito Duranguense who interpreted What I like about you, then give way to Enrique Iglesias that after talking with Gil Greidys, backstage, took the stage to perform her new single When I'm in love. Osmel Sousa did not want to end this season without him Nuestra Belleza Latina to fine one of his pranks. Judge iron got to work, hired a model, got a snake and made the beautiful posing nude in the style of Adam and Eve. According to the judge and photographer Billy Coleman, Tatiana, Ana Patricia and Heidi achieved the best pictures but for experts, the best image was that of Honduras. As a reward, Heidi was invited to a beauty salon where, by surprise was visited by their relatives. This week, the girls in danger of being eliminated were Lisandra, Barbara and Heidi who had to face, next to Juan Manuel Cortes, the director of a renowned magazine, the challenge in vivo. This challenge was knowing how to handle a reporter and as he interviews them, they must try to answer the questions with great discretion so as not to damage their image as they are a recognized actresses. After this challenge, the girls in danger faced votes of their peers. This time Lisandra returned to competition and so, Barbara and Heidi faced the judges. Judges rarely reach agreement but eventually gave Barbara the opportunity to enter the group of six finalists to participate in the gala final. For this reason, Heidi had to say goodbye to her dream. Up to this date it has been the most controversial elimination to happen in Nuestra Belleza Latina, where commotions were being stated in TV shows, forums and websites about the judges decisions of Heidy being eliminated.

Final 6:

| Contestant | Age | Country Representing |
|---|---|---|
| Ana Patricia González | 22 | Mexico |
| Bárbara Moros | 23 | Venezuela |
| Carolina Ramírez | 26 | Colombia |
| Fabiola Barinas | 25 | Dominican Republic |
| Lissandra de la Cruz | 23 | Cuba |
| Tatiana Delgado | 21 | Puerto Rico |

- Challenge of the week winner: Barbara Moros
- Guest Artist: Enrique Iglesias
- Mini-Challenge Guest: Juan Manuel Cortes
- First Call-Out (At the Final Runway): Carolina Ramirez
- Bottom Three: Lisandra de la Cruz, Barbara Moros, Heidy Alvarado
- Sent to bottom two by fellow Contestants: Heidy Alvarado, Barbara Moros
- Saved by the viewer votes: Lisandra de la Cruz
- Saved by the Judges: Barbara Moros
- Eliminated: Heidy Alvarado

=== Season 4: El Destape ===
Original Air Date – 16 May 2010

After the Elimination of Heidy Alvarado, Rodner Figueroa and Natalia Streignard dished on the last six remaining girls. They interviewed each including the eliminee. The show was packed with unseen clips of this year's series. Backstage cameras, behind the scenes footage, interviews with the judges and Families were the main focus. Finalizing with the final Goodbye to Heidy Alvarado.

=== Season 4, Episode 13: And Nuestra Belleza Latina 2010 is... ===
Original Air Date – 23 May 2010

In a gala full of emotions, surprises and challenges of the season, Ana Patricia Gonzalez was crowned the new Nuestra Belleza Latina. The Mexican won the crown to the popular "Fantastic Four" and her good friend Colombian Carolina Ramirez, carrying a prize of more than $250 000.

Anders Hansen was in charge of the first issue of the Grand Final. At the last gala of the competition, Hansen performed an act involving Greidys Gil, accompanied by the song "She Has Fire" by Celia Cruz.

The taste was also a magic act in this spectacular closing. Giselle Blondet prepared for this final dress by designer Anel Bern and other Stracchia Johnny, with whom he announced the winner. Julián Gil was dressed to impress on this occasion, is that the suitor was dressed by Osmel Souza, who along with Rodner Figueroa chose a prince costume for the actor in New York. But they were not alone. As a fairy tale princesses, fashion appropriated the stars of the show and this time the girls wore designer gowns Cadila Argentine Gustavo, who is known for its glamorous vision and combined it with shoes designed by the Venezuelan Luisa Lucci.

At the final gala musical environment filled with rhythm with the Big Boss Daddy Yankee, who began dancing at all-including Giselle Blondet, with its new album material and the Mexican singer-songwriter Descontrol Paz Espinosa, who was the romantic touch with the theme. The challenge of Greidys Gil left them a task for the girls, the first challenge of the last week who tried to make a note for El Gordo y La Flaca the style of the beautiful Cuban and well prepared for what awaits the winner facing the screen. The first thing the girls did on the advice of Nuestra Belleza Latina 2009 was searching the Internet and the necessary information and launch to interview different people in a mall.

The topic was the scandal all week made headlines: the separation of Horoscopos de Durango, who gave the exclusive members of the group in Don Francisco Presenta and by which all received accolades from the three judges: Lupita Jones Julián Gil and Osmel Souza. Challenge in New York, Fine real trouble came in the JC Penney challenge to have to march on a moving bus throughout Manhattan. The double-decker bus became a real dressing room with the girls creating looks carefree, cosmopolitan and full of life. The participants walked as a real tourist gateway to the moving truck. But that did not end all the girls in the study repeated the feat by having to build an entire outfit, explain and model against Martín Llorens, a specialist in beauty and fashion.

The winner of this challenge was Barbara Moors with a look based on the punk rock of the 80s and 90s, the Venezuelan took home $10,000 prize home. They also took time giving the finalist backgrounds, starting with Lissandra de la Cruz Born in Havana and left his family behind to pursue their dreams with his mother. "At age 12 my dad left Cuba without saying anything, for me it was very sad not to have it with me in my celebration of 15 years."

"I started my career as a model in my country and from that moment I knew that was my dream."Tatiana Delgado,"I come from a very close family with two older brothers as a child I always had passion for dancing, I studied dance and my friends and I spent dancing in all the corners. "I never forget where I come or of all the people that I have saved in my heart.".

Barbara Moors, originally from Venezuela, Barbara's family moved to the U.S. when they were put on notice of the difficult season to come to the country. "Thanks to my parents who have made enormous sacrifices I am about to achieve all my dreams". "Be strong my love that so much work, so much sacrifice, not give up never pays off", said his mother.

Ana Patricia González, Born in Sonora, Mexico, home to most of her family. "As a child I liked the fashion and beauty, I was always prevails in all competitions for Sonora, my dad my mom and my main sponsor my fashion consultant." "Three years ago I married the love of my life but it was a very sad too because I moved to America with him and left my family behind."Fabiola Barinas,"I consider myself a happy and flirtatious maybe. My mom is my best friend Rosa, I love her and she inherited everything. "My passion for acting began at age 8, when she participated in beauty pageants at that age I fell in love with acting and that's why I went to different parts of the world, fighting for a dream.". Fabiola de Santo Domingo went to Mexico, then to Los Angeles and then to Miami to try to become Nuestra Belleza Latina.

Carolina Ramirez left Colombia looking for a better place, a brighter future. "We had to leave Colombia as political refugees, we had many near death and so we left, though I see my family."Every day I thank God for all of the blessings he has given me"

Top 6 Finale

| Rank | Contestant | Age | Country Representing |
|---|---|---|---|
| Winner | Ana Patricia González | 22 | Mexico |
| 2nd place | Carolina Ramírez | 26 | Colombia |
| 3rd place | Tatiana Delgado | 21 | Puerto Rico |
| 4th place | Bárbara Moros | 23 | Venezuela |
| 5th place | Lissandra De La Cruz | 23 | Cuba |
| 6th place | Fabiola Barinas | 25 | Dominican Republic |

- Nuestra Belleza Latina 2010: Ana Patricia González
- Special Guests: Daddy Yankee and Greydis Gil
- Challenge of the week winner: Bárbara Moros

=== Season 4: After Hours ===
Original Air Date – 23 May 2010

After the grand finale, Rodner Figueroa and Natalia Streignard will have interviews with the new winner and comments from all the past ladies, that were eliminated from the competition.

== Order of Eliminations ==
=== Semi-finalist ===
- Laura Sierra, Colombia
- Kassandra Cruz, Venezuela
- Gredmarie Colón, Puerto Rico
- Maricely González, Panama
- Sarah López, Mexico
- Melissa Santos, Nicaragua
- Anysha Montalvo, Puerto Rico
- Chanty Vargas, Puerto Rico

=== Finalists ===
(ages stated are at time of contest)

| Rank | Contestant | Age | Country Representing | Eliminated |
|---|---|---|---|---|
| 12th place | Agostina Fusari | 25 | Argentina | 04/11/2010 |
| 11th place | Indiana Sánchez | 22 | Nicaragua | 04/18/2010 |
| 10th place | Cynthia Piña | 26 | Mexico | 04/25/2010 |
| 9th place | Mayra Zavala | 23 | Mexico | 05/02/2010 |
| 8th place | Rossibell Mateo | 21 | Dominican Republic | 05/09/2010 |
| 7th place | Heidy Alvarado | 19 | Honduras | 05/16/2010 |
| 6th place | Fabiola Barinas | 25 | Dominican Republic | 05/23/2010 |
| 5th place | Lissandra de la Cruz | 24^{↑} | Cuba | 05/23/2010 |
| 4th place | Bárbara Moros | 23 | Venezuela | 05/23/2010 |
| 3rd place | Tatiana Delgado | 21 | Puerto Rico | 05/23/2010 |
| 2nd place | Carolina Ramírez | 26 | Colombia | Runner-up |
| 1st place | Ana Patricia González | 22 | Mexico | Winner |

^{↑} At Auditions, Lisandra de la Cruz was 23, during the first week in the Belleza Mansion, Lisandra had her 24th birthday.

== Summaries ==
=== Call-Out Order ===
Giselle's Call-Out Order
| Order | Episodes | | | | | | | | | | | | |
| Order | Top 20 | Final 12 | 1 | 2 | 3 | 4 | 5 | 6 | 7 (Finale) | | | | Top 2 |
|---|---|---|---|---|---|---|---|---|---|---|---|---|---|
| 1 | Ana | Mayra | Indiana | Cynthia | Tatiana | Rossibell | Lissandra | Carolina | Ana | Ana | Ana | Ana | Ana |
| 2 | Bárbara | Rossibell | Carolina | Barbara | Ana | Heidy | Tatiana | Ana | Lissandra | Barbara | Carolina | Carolina | Carolina |
| 3 | Tatiana | Heidy | Tatiana | Lissandra | Fabiola | Ana | Barbara | Tatiana | Tatiana | Carolina | Tatiana | Tatiana | |
| 4 | Sarah | Agostina | Fabiola | Rossibell | Mayra | Tatiana | Heidy | Fabiola | Barbara | Tatiana | Barbara | | |
| 5 | Laura | Tatiana | Mayra | Heidy | Barbara | Lissandra | Ana | Lissandra | Carolina | Lissandra | | | |
| 6 | Carolina | Cynthia | Ana | Tatiana | Lissandra | Carolina | Carolina | Barbara | Fabiola | | | | |
| 7 | Agostina | Barbara | Lissandra | Fabiola | Heidy | Barbara | Fabiola | Heidy | | | | | |
| 8 | Indiana | Indiana | Heidy | Ana | Carolina | Fabiola | Rossibell | | | | | | |
| 9 | Fabiola | Lissandra | Rosibell | Mayra | Rossibell | Mayra | | | | | | | |
| 10 | Kassandra | Carolina | Cynthia | Carolina | Cynthia | | | | | | | | |
| 11 | Melissa | Fabiola | Bárbara | Indiana | | | | | | | | | |
| 12 | Rosibell | Ana | Agostina | | | | | | | | | | |
| 13 | Anysha | Chanty | | | | | | | | | | | |
| 14 | Chanty | Anysha | | | | | | | | | | | |
| 15 | Heydi | Melissa | | | | | | | | | | | |
| 16 | Cinthya | Maricely | | | | | | | | | | | |
| 17 | Mayra | Sarah | | | | | | | | | | | |
| 18 | Maricely | Gredmarie | | | | | | | | | | | |
| 19 | Gredmarie | Laura | | | | | | | | | | | |
| 20 | Lissandra | Kassandra | | | | | | | | | | | |

| Color | Description | Used |
|---|---|---|
| | The contestant won the competition | Top 2 |
| | The contestant won second place | Top 2 |
| | The contestant was eliminated | Top 20–Finale |
| | The contestant won the challenge of the week, and was saved by the judges | Week 6 |
| | The contestant was the judges favorite contestant | Top 20 |
| | The contestant was chosen from online voting | Top 20 |
| | The contestant was saved by the viewers vote | Week 1–3, 6 |
| | The contestant was saved by the judges | Week 1–5 |
| | The contestant won the challenge of the week | Final 12–Week 3, 7 |
| | The contestant won the challenge of the week, and was saved by the viewers vote | Week 4–5 |

== Contestants notes ==
- Ana Patricia Gonzalez participated in Nuestra Belleza Mexico 2005 but did not place.
- (Mexico) Cynthia Piña participated in Señorita Republica Deportiva 2010 and won.
- (Argentina) Agostina Fusari is the new correspondent for A Toda Musica, music channel 2010.
- Indiana Sanchez won Miss Nicaragua 2009 and competed in Miss Universe 2009 but did not place.
- (Nicaragua) Melissa Santos auditioned for Nuestra Belleza Latina 2009 but was voted off in the second round.
- (Puerto Rico) Jessica Santiago competed in America's Next Top Model, Cycle 12 in 2009 where she came in 12th place, and is currently signed with Ford Models in Los Angeles.
- Tatiana Delgado competed in Miss Universe Puerto Rico 2010 representing Canóvanas.
- Chanty Vargas competed in Miss Universe Puerto Rico 2010 representing San Juan where she got Miss Photogenic.
- (Venezuela) Barbara Moros auditioned for Nuestra Belleza Latina 2007 but was voted off in the first round.

== Winners ==
| Preceded by Greydis Gil | Nuestra Belleza Latina 2010; Ana Patricia González | Succeeded by Nastassja Bolivar |
