= Miss International Nicaragua =

National beauty pageant in Nicaragua

- Formation: January 1, 1962; 64 years ago
- Founder: Miss Nicaragua
- Type: Beauty pageant
- Headquarters: Managua
- Location: Nicaragua
- Members: Miss International (1962–present)
- Official language: Spanish
- Miss Nicaragua International 2025: Verónica Iglesias
- Board of directors: Roberto Ñurinda
- Parent organization: Bellezas Globales de Nicaragua

Miss International Nicaragua is a national beauty pageant in Nicaragua, that selects the Nicaraguan representatives for Miss International.

The reining Miss International Nicaragua is Verónica Iglesias from Granada, she represented Nicaragua in 27 November 2025 in Tokyo, Japan. Placing in the top 10 semifinalist.

== History ==
The pageant began in the 1960s when clubs in Managua, including the Club de Leones and the Club 20–30 started the pageant with the selection of candidates across the country. In 2001, the Miss Nicaragua Organization, selected the Nicaraguan representatives at Miss International, choosing one amongst several finalists. Starting in 2018 the Miss Nicaragua Organization lost its franchise due to financial problems rising in the Miss Nicaragua pageant. The current organization of Miss Mundo Nicaragua by Denis Dávila is the one selecting the Nicaraguan representatives in Miss International.

== Titleholders ==
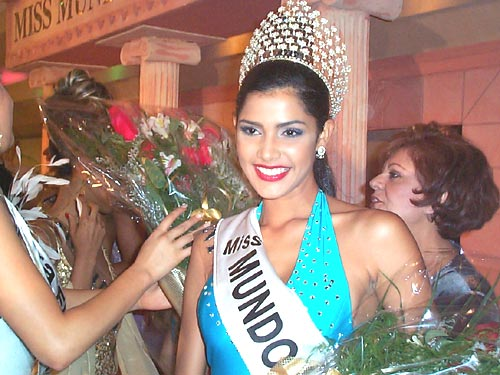
Marianela Lacayo, Miss International Nicaragua 2002

Year	Miss Nicaragua	State	Venue
1962	María Elena Hasbani	Granada	Designated
1963	Claudia Díaz	Estelí	Designated
1964	Ileana Rojas	Managua	Designated
1965	Patricia Mena	Managua	Designated
1967	Milagros Argüello	León	Designated
1968	Nadia Leets Lacayo	Managua	Designated
1969	Margarita Cuadra	Granada	Designated
1970	Jessie Salinas	León	Designated
1971	Odilie Díaz	León	Designated
1972	Connie Ballantyne	Managua	Designated
1973	Fabiola Cárdenas	Granada	Designated
1974	María Rivas	Masaya	Designated
1975	Sofía Argüello del Castillo	Matagalpa	Designated
1976	María Fiallos	Granada	Designated
1977	María Griffith	Masaya	Designated
1978	Auxiliadora Paguaga	Managua	Designated
1979	María Elena Amador	Managua	Designated
1993	Ida Delaney	Managua	Designated
1994	Luisa Urcuyo	Managua	Designated
1999	Claudia Alaniz	Managua	Designated
2000	Marynes Argüello	Managua	Designated
2001	Renneé Dávila	Managua	February 3, 2001
2002	Marianela Lacayo	Managua	March 7, 2002
2005	Daniela Clerk	Managua	March 5, 2005
2009	Slilma Ulloa	Matagalpa	March 7, 2009
2010	Indira Rojas	Rivas	February 27, 2010
2012	Reyna Pérez	Chinandega	March 17, 2012
2013	Celeste Castillo	Managua	March 2, 2013
2014	Jeimmy García	Rivas	March 15, 2014
2015	Yaoska Ruiz	Managua	March 7, 2015
2016	Brianny Chamorro	Managua	March 5, 2016
2017	Helen Martínez	Matagalpa	March 25, 2017
2018	Stefanía Alemán	Masaya	Designated
2019	María Gabriela Saballos	Managua	February 16, 2019
2020	Sherly Casco	Jinotega	February 14, 2020
Against COVID-19 pandemic no pageant between 2020 and 2021
2022	Fernanda Salazar	Managua	July 2, 2022
2023	Leylani Leytón	Managua	Designated
2024	Mariela Cerros	Nueva Segovia	Designated
2024	Dorianny Carmona	Chontales	Did not compete
2025	Verónica Iglesias	Granada	March 23, 2025

== International representatives ==
Declared as the winner
Ended as the runner-up
Ended as a finalist or semi-finalist

Year	Representative	State	Competition performance		
Year	Representative	State	Placements	Title/Award	Fast Track
Did not compete in 2026
2025	Verónica Iglesias	Granada	Top 10		
2024	Mariela Cerros	Nueva Segovia			
2023	Leylani Leytón	Managua			
2022	Fernanda Salazar	Managua			
Due to the impact of COVID-19 pandemic, no competition held between 2020–2021
2020	Sherly Casco	Jinotega	Did not compete		
2019	María Gabriela Saballos	Managua			
2018	Stefanía Alemán	Masaya			
2017	Helen Martínez	Matagalpa			
2016	Brianny Chamorro	Managua	3rd Runner-up	Best National Costume	
2015	Yaoska Ruiz	Managua			
2014	Jeimmy García	Rivas			
2013	Celeste Castillo	Managua			
2012	Reyna Pérez	Chinandega			
Did not compete in 2011
2010	Indira Rivas	Estelí			
2009	Slilma Ulloa	Managua			
Did not compete between 2006–2008
2005	Daniela Clerk	Managua			
Did not compete between 2003–2004
2002	Marianela Lacayo	Managua	Top 12		
2001	Renneé Dávila	Managua			
2000	Marynes Argüello	Managua			
1999	Claudia Alaniz	Managua	Top 15		
Did not compete between 1995–1998
1994	Luisa Amalia Urcuyo	Managua	Top 15		
1993	Ida Delaney	Managua			
Did not compete between 1980–1992
1979	María Amador	Managua			
1978	Auxiliadora Paguaga	Managua			
1977	María Griffith	Masaya			
1976	María Fiallos	Granada			
1975	Myra Barquero	Managua			
1974	María Rivas	Masaya	Top 15		
1973	Fabiola Cárdenas	Granada			
1972	Connie Ballantyne	Managua			
1971	Odilie Díaz	León			
1970	Jessie Salinas	Managua		Miss Friendship	
1969	Margarita Cuadra	Managua	2nd Runner-up		
1968	Nadia Leets	Managua	Top 15		
1967	Milagros Argüello	León			
Did not compete in 1966
1965	Patricia Mena	Managua			
1964	Ileana Rojas	Managua			
1963	Claudia Díaz	Estelí			
1962	María Elena Hasbani	Granada			

== Regional rankings ==
Department	Titles	Years
Managua	19	1964; 1965; 1968; 1972; 1978; 1979; 1993; 1994; 1999; 2000; 2001; 2002; 2005; 2013; 2015; 2016; 2019; 2022; 2023
Granada	5	1962; 1969; 1973; 1976; 2025
Masaya	4	1974; 1975; 1977; 2018
León	3	1967; 1970; 1971
Matagalpa	2	2009; 2017
Rivas	2	2010; 2014
Estelí	1	1963
Chinandega	1	2012
Jinotega	1	2020
Nueva Segovia	1	2024

== See also ==
- Miss Universe Nicaragua
- Señorita Nicaragua
