= Señorita Nicaragua =

National beauty pageant in Nicaragua

- Type: Women's beauty pageant
- Franchise holder: Óscar Zelaya
- Headquarters: Managua
- Country represented: Nicaragua
- Qualifies for: Reina Hispanoamericana; Miss Latinoamérica; Miss Progress International; Nuestra Latina Univeral; Miss Mesoamérica
- First edition: 2006
- Most recent edition: 2024
- Current titleholder: Elizabeth Córdoba; Managua
- Executive Committee: Óscar Zelaya
- Owner: Óscar Zelaya Runway Academy
- Language: Spanish
- Website: www.instagram.com/senoritanicaraguaoficial

Señorita Nicaragua formerly known as Miss Latinoamérica Nicaragua is a national beauty pageant in Nicaragua that celebrates the beauty of women across the country. The pageant was formerly under the Miss Nicaragua and Miss Mundo Nicaragua organization until 2015 when a separate organization got the franchise for Reina Hispanoamericana. Nicaragua has competed in the international pageant since 2006 when it received an invitation from Promociones Gloria to compete.

The Señorita Nicaragua pageant, formerly known as Miss Latinoamérica Nicaragua, used this name until 1999.

== Titleholders ==
Year	Miss Nicaragua	Department
2006	Arlen Montoya	Managua
2007	Slilma Ulloa	Matagalpa
2008	Alejandra Borge	Managua
2009	Indira Rojas	Rivas
2010	Indiana Sánchez	USA
2011	Norma Fuentes	Chinandega
2012	Virginia Claros	Managua
2013	Darling Trujillo	Matagalpa
2014	Karen Gutiérrez	Managua
2015	Alejandra Gross	Managua
2016	Jennifer Cáceres	León
2017	Ariadna Orellana	León
2018	Alicia Ramírez	Managua
2019	Stefanía Alemán	Masaya
2020	Odalis Soza	Matagalpa
2021	Yenifer Pérez	Managua
2022	Jade Herrera	Managua
2023	Alejandra Aburto	Masaya
2024	Elizabeth Córdoba	Managua

== Nicaragua in Miss Latinoamérica ==
- : Declared as winner
- : Ended as runner-up or top 5/6 qualification
- : Ended as one of the finalists or semifinalists
- : Ended as special awards winner

Year	Department	Miss Nicaragua	Placement at Miss Latinoamerica	Special awards
2025	Managua	Elizabeth Córdoba	1st Runner-up	Best National Costume; Best in Runway; 3rd Place at Best Body
2024	Managua	Yenifer Pérez	Virreina Latinoamerica	Best in swimsuit competition; Best Silhouette; Best in National Costume
2023	Managua	Jade Herrera	4th Runner-up	Miss Elegance
2022	Matagalpa	Odalis Soza	Virreina Latinoamericana	Best in National Costume; Miss Elegance
2021	Estelí	Fernanda Sobalvarro	Unplaced	
2020	Masaya	María Laura Castillo	Miss Latinoamérica 2020	Best in Pasarela
2019	Managua	Luz González	1st Runner-up	
2018	Nueva Segovia	Stefany Reyes	Unplaced	
2017	Managua	María Gabriela Chacón	Unplaced	
2016	Chinandega	María Salgado	Unplaced	
2015	Carazo	Bianca Gutiérrez	Virreina Latinoamericana	Best Silueta
2014	Managua	Doris Hidalgo	Unplaced	
2013	León	Jennifer Masís	Unplaced	Best in National Costume
2012	Managua	Diana Flores	Unplaced	Best Hair

== Nicaragua in Miss Progress International ==
- : Declared as winner
- : Ended as runner-up or top 5/6 qualification
- : Ended as one of the finalists or semifinalists
- : Ended as special awards winner

Year	Department	Miss Nicaragua	Placement at Miss Progress International	Special awards
2025	Matagalpa	Milagros Centeno	Unplaced	Miss Progress Cultural Integration
2023	Matagalpa	Odalis Soza	Miss Progress International 2023	Miss Progress Environment

== Nicaragua in Reina Hispanoamericana ==
In 2006 Nicaragua debuts in the first pageant Reina Hispanoamericana

Note: The current franchise owner started the competition on 2023. The current national director is Edwin Avilés.

- : Declared as winner
- : Ended as runner-up or top 5/6 qualification
- : Ended as one of the finalists or semifinalists
- : Ended as special awards winner

Year	Department	Miss Nicaragua	Placement at Reina Hispanoamericana	Special awards
2026	Granada	Verónica Iglesias	TBD	
2025	Managua	Luz Solage González	6th Runner-up	Top 5 at Miss Turismo Internacional
2024	Granada	Leda Rodríguez	Unplaced	
2023	Managua	Gabriela Rodríguez	Unplaced	
2022	Managua	Yenifer Pérez	Top 14	Top 7 at Best Silueta
2021	Matagalpa	Odalis Soza	Unplaced	
2020	Due to the impact of COVID-19 pandemic, no competition held			
2019	Masaya	Stefanía Alemán	Unplaced	
2018	Managua	Alicia Ramírez	Unplaced	
2017	León	Ariadna Orellana	Unplaced	
2016	León	Jennifer Cáceres	Unplaced	
2015	Managua	Alejandra Gross	Unplaced	
2014	Managua	Karen Gutiérrez	Unplaced	1st Place at Best National Costume
2013	Matagalpa	Darling Trujillo	Unplaced	Best in National Costume
2012	Managua	Virginia Claros	Unplaced	
2011	Chinandega	Norma Fuentes	Unplaced	
2010	USA	Indiana Sánchez	Unplaced	
2009	Rivas	Indira Rojas	Unplaced	
2008	Managua	Alejandra Borge	Unplaced	
2007	Matagalpa	Slilma Ulloa	Unplaced	
2006	Managua	Arlen Montoya	Unplaced	

== See also ==
- Miss Universe Nicaragua
- Miss Supranational Nicaragua
