= Miss Nicaragua 2009 =

- Date: March 7, 2009
- Presenters: Ivan Taylor, Bertha Valle
- Venue: Teatro Nacional Rubén Darío, Managua, Nicaragua
- Broadcaster: Televicentro
- Entrants: 16
- Winner: Indiana Sánchez; USA Nica

The Miss Nicaragua 2009 pageant, was held on March 7, 2009 in Managua, after weeks of events. At the conclusion of the final night of competition, Indiana Sánchez won the title of Miss Universe Nicaragua 2009. She represented Nicaragua at Miss Universe 2009, held in the Bahamas later that year.

== Results ==
=== Placements ===
Placement	Contestant
Miss Nicaragua 2009	USA Nica – Indiana Sánchez
Miss Nicaragua International 2009	Matagalpa – Slilma Ulloa
1st Runner-Up	Managua – Maritza Rivas
Top 6	Chontales – Raysa Cuadra; Jinotega – Lucía Sequeira; Ciudad Dario – Darling Trujillo

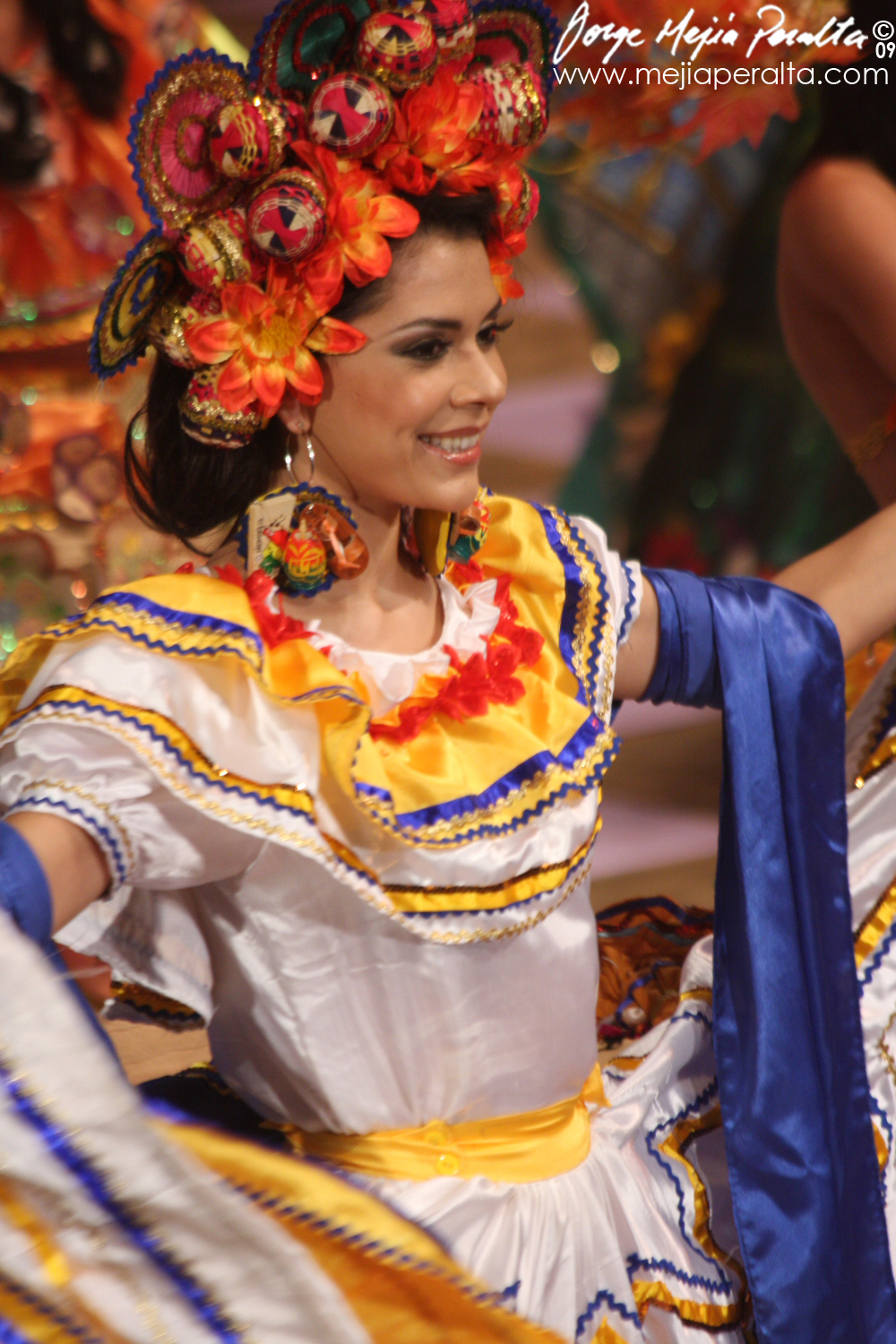
Sánchez in 2009.

== Special awards ==
- Best Regional Costume - Masaya - Karen Carrión
- Most Beautiful Face - Leon - Massiel Arévalo
- Miss Photogenic - Rivas - Arlen América
- Miss Congeniality - Esteli - Yovanela Ráudez
- Miss Attitude - USA Nica - Indiana Sánchez
- Best Model - RAAN - Iris Ordeñana

== Official Contestants ==
State	Contestant
Bluefields	Kathiel Lampson
Carazo	Xiomara Hurtado
Chontales	Raysa Cuadra
Ciudad Dario	Darling Trujillo
Diriamba	Sabá Arévalo
Estelí	Yovanela Raudez
Granada	Tania Reyes
Jinotega	Lucía Sequeira
Leon	Massiel Arévalo
Managua	Maritza Rivas
Masaya	Karen Carrión
Matagalpa	Slilma Ulloa
Nueva Segovia	Anielka Espino
RACCN	Iris Ordeñana
Rivas	Arlen Mora
USA Nica	Indiana Sánchez
