= Marianela Lacayo =

Nicaraguan model and entrepreneur (born 1981)

Marianela Lacayo Mendoza
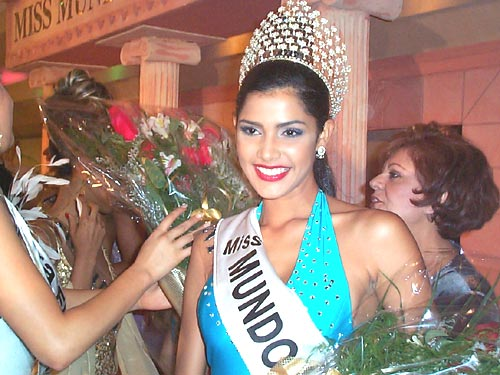
- Lacyao receiving the Miss Mundo Latino Internacional 2002 crown
- Born: Marianela Lacayo; 20 March 1981 (age 44); Managua, Nicaragua
- Occupations: Model, journalist
- Height: 5.9 ft (1.8 m)
- Title: Miss Nicaragua 2002; Miss Mundo Latino Internacional 2002
- Children: Fernando Cuenco

Marianela Lacayo Mendoza (b. 20 March 1981) is a Nicaraguan model, entrepreneur and beauty pageant titleholder. She was the winner of Miss Nicaragua 2002 and Miss World Latin International 2002 beauty pageants.

Lacayo was born in Managua. She holds a degree in business administration from UNICIT and MBA from the American University of Nicaragua and Technological Institute of Monterrey, Master in Image consulting from the Color Me Beautiful school in London and a diploma in Leadership and Electoral Strategies for Political Women from Latin University of Panama.

Currently, she works in the fashion sector as an image consultant and in journalism as a columnist for magazines Mía, De Boda Novias, and Nicaragua and the newspaper La Prensa. Previously, she collaborated with the magazines Fashion & Life and Scaparate.

== Biography ==
When Lacayo was 14, she almost drowned attempting to rescue a friend at a pool before being saved herself.

In September 2009, Lacayo wed Fernando Cuenco, from Spain. On 14 February 2017, Lacayo announced that she was pregnant with her son. He was named Fernando. She was then residing in Panama.

== Citations ==
Awards and achievements
Preceded by Ligia Argüello	Miss Nicaragua; 2002	Succeeded by Claudia Salmerón
Preceded by Renneé Dávila	Miss International Nicaragua; 2002	Succeeded by Daniela Clerk
