= Adriana Paniagua =

Miss Nicaragua 2018, contestant in Miss Universe 2018

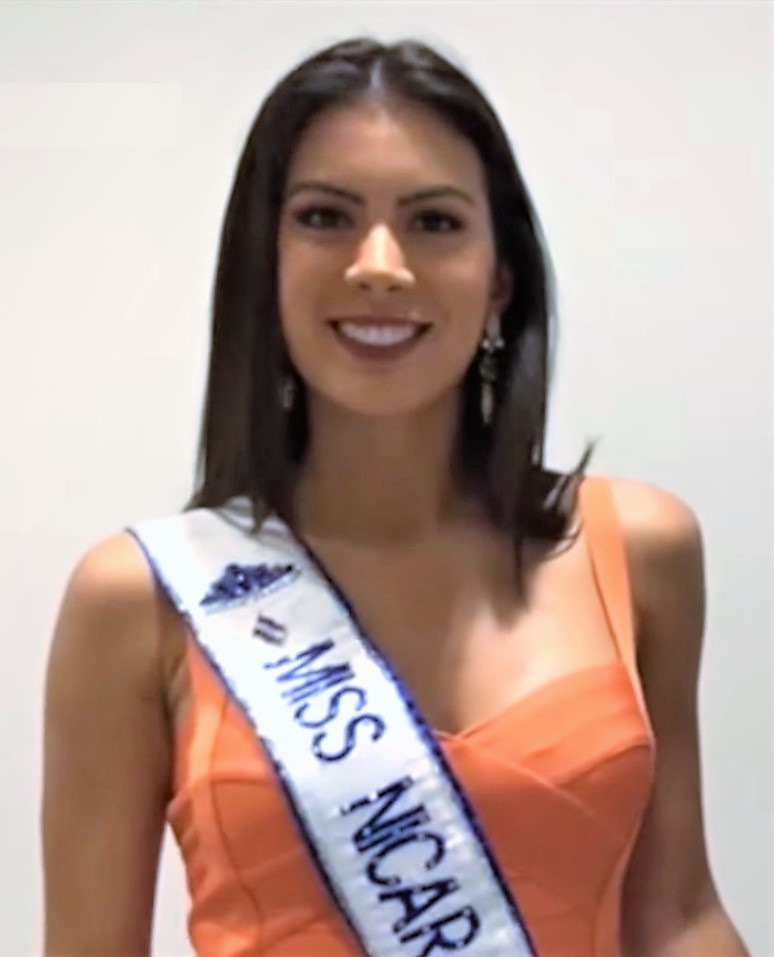
- Paniagua in 2020
- Born: Adriana María Paniagua Cabrera; November 24, 1995 (age 30); Chinandega, Nicaragua
- Height: 1.70 m (5 ft 7 in)
- Beauty pageant titleholder
- Title: Miss Teen Nicaragua 2011; Miss Teen International 2011; Miss Mundo Nicaragua 2013; Miss Nicaragua 2018
- Hair color: Black
- Eye color: Dark Brown
- Major competitions: Miss Teen Nicaragua 2011 (Winner); Miss Teen International 2011 (Winner); Miss Mundo Nicaragua 2013 (Winner); Miss Nicaragua 2018 (Winner) (Best Hair) (Best secret personality) (Miss Eyewear) (Best Face) (Miss Digital Moviestar) (The Gold Candidate) (The best smile); Miss Universe 2018 (Unplaced)

Adriana María Paniagua Cabrera (born 24 November 1995 in Chinandega, Nicaragua) is a Nicaraguan model and beauty pageant titleholder who won the Miss Nicaragua 2018 and competed at Miss Universe 2018 pageant.

== Personal life ==
Paniagua lives in Chinandega, Nicaragua. She works as a model and has a license in Global management and finance.

== Pageantry ==
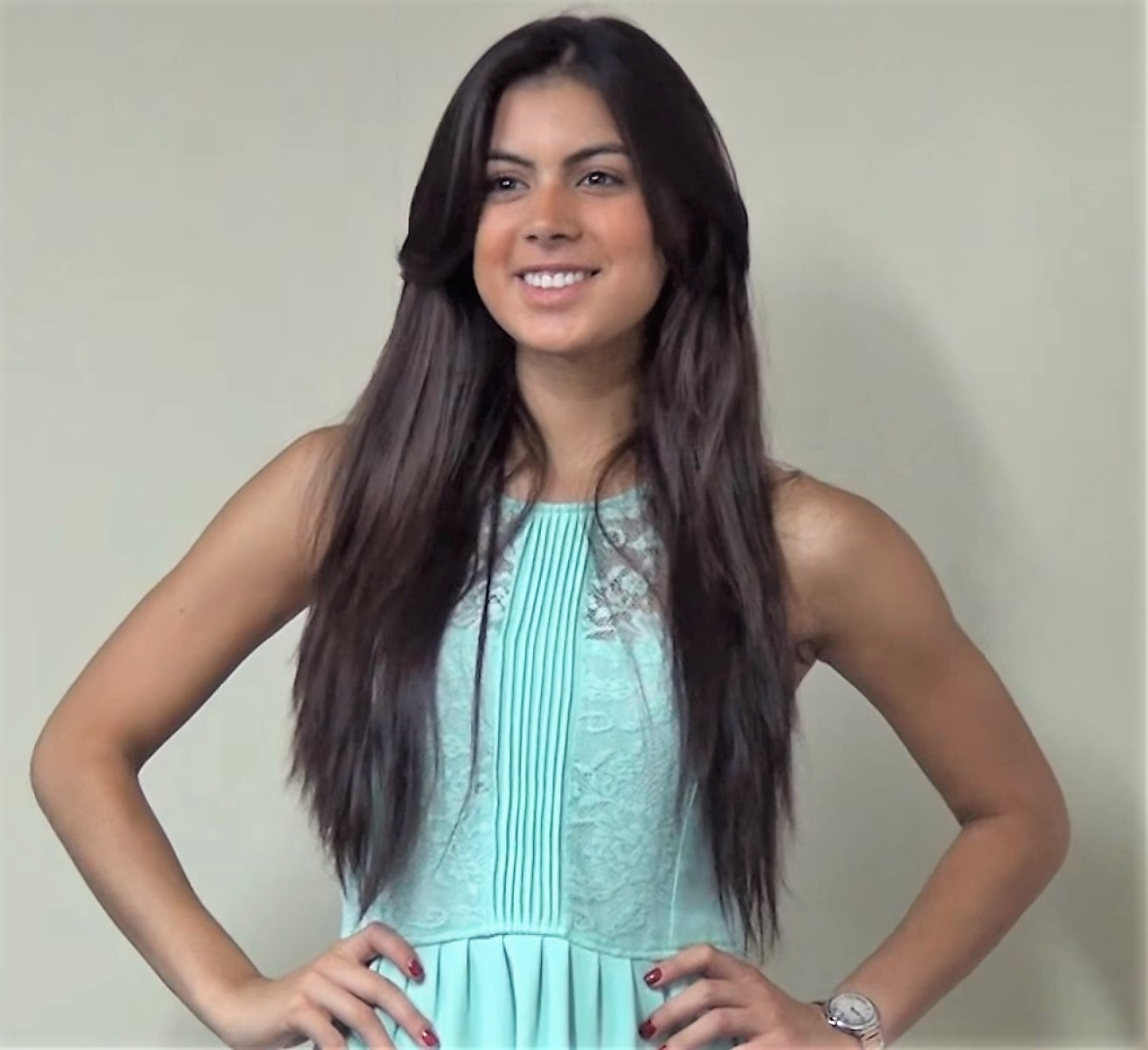
Paniagua in 2013 after refusing to compete in Miss World, saying she was not ready

Between 2011 and 2018 Paniagua won a number beauty pageants including Miss Teen Nicaragua, Miss Teen International, Miss Mundo Nicaragua and lastly, Miss Nicaragua 2018. In 2013, she withdrew from the Miss World 2013 contest in Indonesia, for personal reasons. In 2018 she represented Chinandega at Miss Nicaragua 2018 and won the title. Paniagua also won a number of special awards including Best Hair, Best secret personality, Miss Eyewear, Best Face, Miss Digital Moviestar, Gold Candidate and Best Smile. She represented her country at the Miss Universe 2018 later this year, but did not place in the semifinals.

== Politics ==
Paniagua has been vocal in her support of the 2018 protests against President Daniel Ortega; writing "For a free Nicaragua, where there exists justice, liberty, and democracy" ("Por una Nicaragua libre, donde exista la justicia, libertad y democracia.") in a June 2018 Instagram post. She has also been vocal in her support of freedom of expression and women's rights within the nation.

Awards and achievements
Preceded by (Aruba) Lynette do Nascimento	Miss Teen International; 2011	Succeeded by (Puerto Rico) Valerie Hernández
Preceded by Berenice Quezada	Miss Nicaragua; 2018	Succeeded by Inés López
