= Indiana Sánchez =

Nicaraguan beauty pageant titleholder

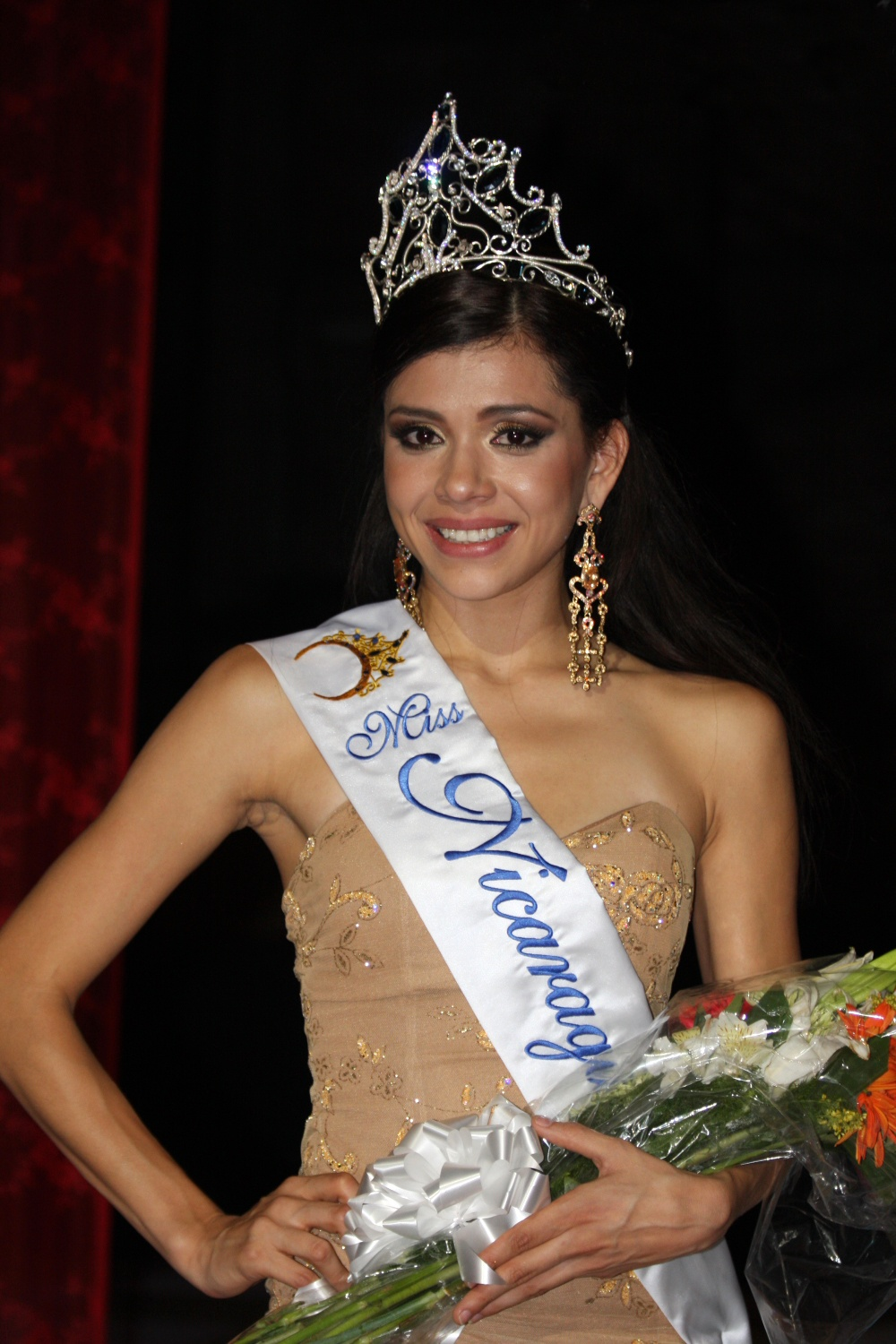
- Sánchez in 2009
- Beauty pageant titleholder
- Title: Miss Nicaragua 2009
- Major competitions: Miss Nicaragua 2009 (Winner); Miss Universe 2009 (top 10); Nuestra Belleza Latina 2010 (11th place)

Indiana Sánchez is a Nicaraguan, and the national director of Miss Universe Nicaragua, and a beauty pageant titleholder who won Miss Nicaragua 2009 on March 7, 2009 at the Ruben Dario National Theater in Managua. She was crowned by the previous Miss Nicaragua, Thelma Rodriguez. Sánchez represented Nicaragua at Miss Universe 2009, held in August at the Atlantis Paradise Island in the Bahamas.. She reached the top 10, and was also second in the national costume event.

After Miss Nicaragua, she was 11th in the Nuestra Belleza Latina 2010 Reality Show aired on Univision. Currently Indiana is residing in Miami where she plans to leave nursing aside and pursue a career as an actress.

Awards and achievements
Preceded by Thelma Rodríguez	Miss Nicaragua; 2009	Succeeded by Scharllette Allen
Preceded by Thelma Rodríguez	Miss Continente Americano Nicaragua; 2009	Succeeded by Scharllette Allen
Preceded by Indira Rojas	Reina Hispanoamericana Nicaragua; 2010	Succeeded by Norma Fuentes
