= Marian Rodríguez =

Nicaraguan beauty pageant titleholder

- Born: Potosí, Nicaragua
- Education: Keiser University
- Height: 1.68 m (5 ft 6 in)
- Beauty pageant titleholder
- Title: Miss Cosmo Nicaragua 2025; (Winner); Miss Cosmo 2025; (Unplaced); Miss Earth Nicaragua 2026; Miss Earth 2026(TBD)

Marian Rodríguez is a Nicaraguan beauty pageant titleholder. She won Miss Cosmo Nicaragua 2025 and represented her country at Miss Cosmo 2025 in Vietnam. On october 19 she was designated as the new Miss Earth Nicaragua 2026 ando Will represent Nicaragua at Miss Earth 2026 on November in the Philippines.

== Pageantry ==
=== Miss Cosmo Nicaragua 2025 ===
Marian Rodríguez first participated in Bellezas Globales de Nicaragua 2025 and won the title of Miss Cosmo Nicaragua 2025.

=== Miss Cosmo 2025 ===
Rodríguez represented Nicaragua at Miss Cosmo 2025, in Vietnam in December 2025.

Awards and achievements
Preceded by Julia Aguilar	Miss Cosmo Nicaragua; 2025	Succeeded by Milagros López
