= Greidys Gil =

Cuban actress (born 1980)

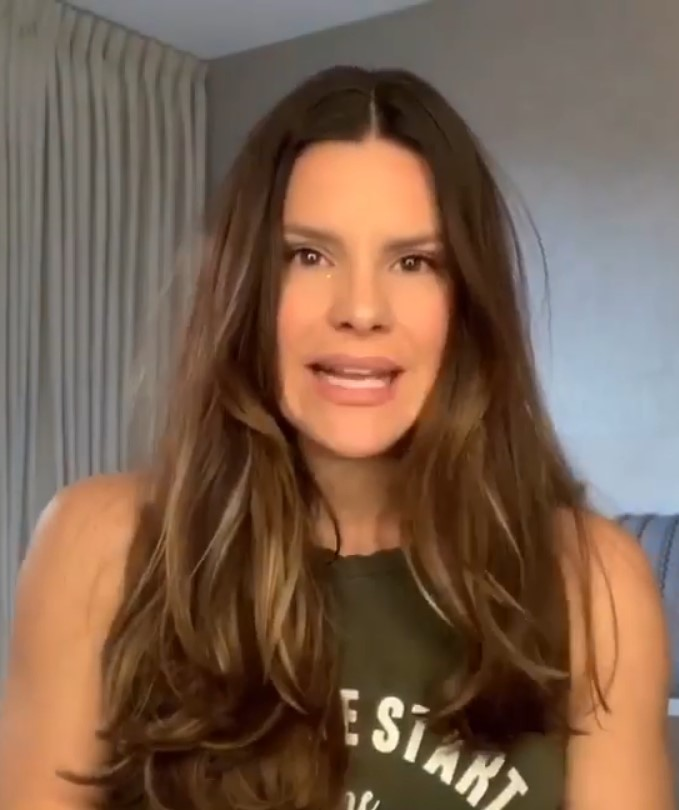
- Born: Greidys Gil Nimo; November 18, 1980 (age 45); Havana, Cuba
- Height: 1.65 m (5 ft 5 in)
- Spouse: Luis Zaldívar (m. 2015)
- Children: 2
- Beauty pageant titleholder
- Title: Nuestra Belleza Latina 2009
- Hair color: Brown
- Eye color: Brown
- Major competitions: Nuestra Belleza Latina 2009 (Winner)

Greidys Zaldívar (née: Greidys Gil Nimo; born November 18, 1980, in Havana) is a Cuban actress, television host, model and beauty queen. Gil became a contestant on the reality show/beauty contest Nuestra Belleza Latina. After weeks of competition and eliminations, Gil won the grand prize of $200,000 and a contract with Univision and earned the title of Nuestra Belleza Latina 2009. She won the challenge of the "50 Mas Bellos" and formed part of the 50 Mas Bellos of the People en Espanol magazine.

== Early life ==
Greidys Gil was born in Havana, Cuba, on November 18, 1980. She was raised in the town of San Antonio de Las Vegas by her mother Kenya Nimo and her grandmother Blanca Rosa Piñero. Her father, Esnel Gil, emigrated to the United States in 1980 during the Mariel exodus without having the opportunity to return to Cuba or to meet Greidys until 14 years later. Kenya and Esnel remarried other partners and had other children. Gil has mentioned that for her there are no half brothers or sisters, "Jackeline Gil and Yendry Mendez are my siblings even if we are not from the same father or mother." From a very young age, Gil always had an inclination for the arts and complemented her studies with singing lessons, dance, fine arts and theatre. For several years, she practiced rhythmic gymnastics and musical aerobics and her teachers thought of her as multifaceted. At 14-years-old, she was diagnosed with Nephrotic Syndrome, which caused her to interrupt her studies for one year and kept her from continuing her art education. She later went back to school but this time she enrolled at the University of Jose Antonio Echevarria where she graduated with a degree in industrial engineering.

In 2005, Gil decided to leave Cuba and emigrate to the United States looking for better opportunities and pursue new interests. She was quoted with saying, "I came to the United States with nothing but a bag full of dreams". In 2011, she was able to bring her mother from Cuba, and in 2014, she was able to bring her brother.

== Career ==
Gil's first experience of fame and recognition came via the Nuestra Belleza Latina Show, a hit beauty pageant reality show on the Univision Network. She was the chosen winner of the show's third season. She was also selected as one of the top most beautiful people by the Magazine People en Español. She has been called the international beauty queen Cuba has longed for in the past 50 years by her fans and admirers in Cuba due to the absence of any type of international beauty pageants on the Island country.

From 2009 to 2011, Gil was awarded an exclusive contract with Univision, representing the Network in all of its events in and out of the United States and worked as jury, reporter or co-host. She was invited co-host in the popular morning radio show at Amor93.1 of the SBS Network, in New York City.

In 2010, she made her acting debut on Univision's first telenovela, Eva Luna. She then went on to play the roles of Tamara in Corazon Valiente, Silvia Villalobos in Rosario, and Karla in Marido en Alquiler.

== Endorsements & Commercials ==
Gil has featured in the commercials of various companies, such as, Maybelline, Garnier Fructis, State Farm Insurance, AT&T, J. C. Penney, and P.C. Richard & Son.

== Personal life ==
Gil is active in several non-profit community organizations such as Amigos For Kids, Go red de corazón, Family Builders USA foundation, Make-A-Wish Foundation and several other benefits. Currently planning an organization to help children with renal deficiencies and more specific Nephrotic Syndrome.

In 2009 she was recognized as a Hispanic Woman of Distinction.

In 2012, she was recognized in Exponica Internacional, Feria de las Americas XXII Aniversario, for her artistic capabilities as well as support and participation in the Hispanic community.

In 2014, she became engaged to her longtime boyfriend Luis Zaldivar where they currently reside in Miami. The two married in January 2015 in the Dominican Republic. On February 10, 2016, the couple welcomed their first child, a son, Lucan Mílan. In 2018 they welcomed a daughter Grace.

== Filmography ==
=== Telenovelas ===
- 2010: Eva Luna as Claudia Jimena (Venevision & Univision)
- 2012: Corazón Valiente as Tamara (Telemundo)
- 2012: Rosario as Silvia (Venevision & Univision)
- 2013: Marido en Alquiler as Karla (Telemundo)

=== Television programs ===
- Miss Venezuela as jury
- Reina Hispanoamericana as jury
- El Gordo y la Flaca show as reporter and co-host
- Nuestra Belleza Latina as co-host (4th season)
- Parade of Roses in Pasadena as co-host
- Don Francisco as invited artist
- Sabado Gigante (Galavision) as co-host
- Tardes Calientes (Univision Radio) as co-host

== Notes ==
Awards and achievements
Preceded by (Puerto Rico) Melissa Marty	Nuestra Belleza Latina; 2009	Succeeded by (Mexico) Ana Patricia Gámez
