= Miss Nicaragua 2018 =

- Date: March 22, 2018
- Presenters: Osman Flores & Valeria Sánchez
- Venue: Teatro Nacional Rubén Darío, Managua, Nicaragua
- Broadcaster: VosTV
- Entrants: 15
- Placements: 6
- Winner: Adriana Paniagua; Chinandega

The Miss Nicaragua 2018 pageant, was held on March 22, 2018, in Managua, after several weeks of events. At the conclusion of the final night of competition, Adriana Paniagua from Chinandega won the title. She represented Nicaragua at Miss Universe 2018. The rest of the finalists would enter different pageants.

== Results ==
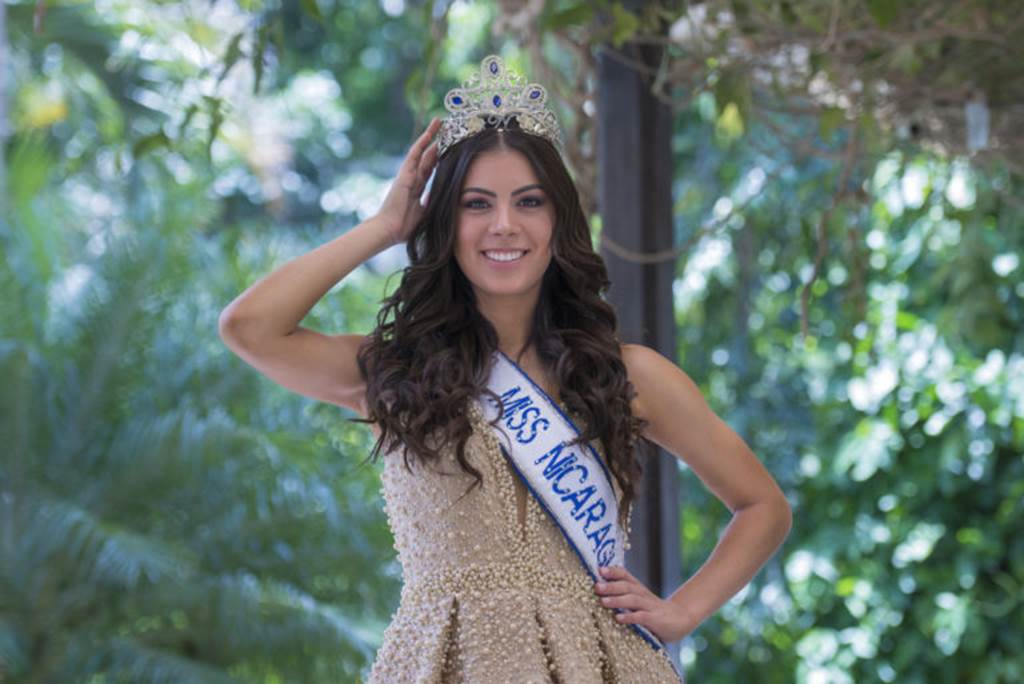
Adriana Paniagua, in 2018.

Results and special awards were the following:

=== Placements ===
| Placement | Contestant |
|---|---|
| Miss Universe Nicaragua 2018 | Chinandega – Adriana Paniagua |
| Miss World Nicaragua 2018 | Boaco – Yoseling Gómez |
| 1st Runner-Up | Managua – Ingger Zepeda |
| 2nd Runner-Up | León – Alejandra Pereira |
| Top 6 | Tipitapa – Laura Ramírez; Villanueva – Belén Espinales |

=== Special awards ===
- Miss Photogenic - Villanueva - Belén Espinales
- Best Smile - Chinandega - Adriana Paniagua
- Best Hair - Chinandega - Adriana Paniagua
- Miss Attitude - Jinotega - Dayrin Talavera

== .Official Contestants ==
| State | Contestant |
|---|---|
| Bluefields | Katherine Chavarría |
| Boaco | Yoseling Gómez |
| Camoapa | Yubelka Sandigo |
| Chinandega | Adriana Paniagua |
| Chontales | Geysell García |
| Ciudad Sandino | Omara Muñoz |
| Corinto | Nayris Davila |
| Granada | Sandra Cajina |
| Jinotega | Dayrin Talavera |
| Leon | Alejandra Pereira |
| Managua | Ingger Zepeda Solano |
| Matagalpa | Marlen Morales |
| Muelle de los Bueyes | Daniela Garzón |
| Tipitapa | Laura Ramírez |
| Villanueva | Belén Espinales |

== .Judges ==
- Waskar Medal - Executive Director at Charmante Ecole, NY
- Sandra Rios - Miss Earth Nicaragua 2005
- Maria Gabriela Castillo - Marketing Manager of APEN (Association of Producers and Exporters of Nicaragua)
- Ligia de Kosh - Regional Manager of Firenze Shampoo
- Jeannette Duque-Estrada - President of Serlisa Group
- Julio Rosales - Professional Photographer
- Belgica Suarez De Plasencia - Fashion Designer
- Reina Gonzalez de Ordoñez - Associate Partner of KPMG US, LLP
