= Ana Patricia Gámez =

Mexican host and beauty pageant titleholder

Ana Patricia
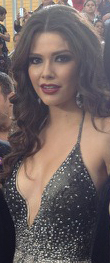
- Ana Patricia at the 2012 Latin Grammys
- Born: Ana Patricia Gámez Montes; 26 July 1987 (age 38); Navojoa, Sonora, Mexico
- Height: 1.75 m (5 ft 9 in)
- Title: Nuestra Belleza Latina 2010
- Spouses: Fernando Gonzalez (m. 2009; div. 2013) Luis Carlos Martínez (m. 2014; div. 2025)
- Children: 2

Ana Patricia Gámez Montes (formerly González and Martínez; born July 26, 1987) is a Mexican beauty queen who won the fourth year of Univision's beauty contest/reality television show Nuestra Belleza Latina on 23 May 2010.

== Early life and pageantry ==
Gámez was born in Navojoa, Sonora, and participated in the national Nuestra Belleza México contest. The eighteen-year-old represented the state of Sonora in the 2005 edition of that event.

A few years later, Gámez auditioned for Nuestra Belleza Latina 2010 in Los Angeles, and was selected to participate in that reality show. After weeks of competition and eliminations, she won the grand prize of US$250,000, a contract with Univision and the title "Nuestra Belleza Latina 2010", making her the second Mexican woman to obtain the title, after Alejandra Espinoza in 2007. Alejandra, Ana Patricia, and Francisca Lachapel are currently the only winners of Nuestra Belleza Latina to never be in the Bottom 2 or 3. She also won the 50 Mas Bellos challenge and was featured among People en Español magazine's 50 most beautiful people of 2010.

== Career and personal life ==
From 2011 to 2019, Gámez worked as an entertainment correspondent for Univision's ¡Despierta América!. From 2019 to 2025, Gámez hosted Enamorándonos, alongside Chilean TV presenter Rafael Araneda. She is also part of MC2 Models. She is currently represented by Latin Marketing Entertainment. From 2009 to 2013, Ana Patricia was married to Fernando González. In 2013, she became engaged to Luis Carlos Martínez Rubio, the brother of her Despierta América co-host Karla Martínez. The couple married in May 2014 and the following year on May 5, 2015, welcomed a girl named Giulietta Martínez.

On 5 March 2026, Gámez joined Telemundo and made her on-air debut for the network the following day on Hoy Día.

== Notes ==
Awards and achievements
Preceded by (Cuba) Greidys Gil	Nuestra Belleza Latina; 2010	Succeeded by (Nicaragua) Nastassja Bolívar
Preceded by Alexia Vázquez	Nuestra Belleza Sonora (Designation); 2005	Succeeded by Nilza Dominguez; Lydia Bernal
