= Miss Mundo Nicaragua =

Beauty pageant

- Type: Women's beauty pageant
- Headquarters: Managua
- Country represented: Nicaragua
- Qualifies for: Miss World; Mister World; Miss International; Miss Cosmo; Reinado Internacional del Café
- First edition: 1960
- Last edition: 2025
- Current titleholder: Belén Cáceres; Matagalpa
- Executive Committee: Amarilis Soza; Roberto Ñurinda
- CEO: Denis Dávila
- Language: Spanish
- Website: missmundonicaragua.com

Miss Mundo Nicaragua is a beauty pageant in Nicaragua that selects the country's representatives to the Miss World, Mister World, Miss International and Miss Cosmo ones of the Big Four international beauty pageants.

Since 1960 Nicaragua has competed in the Miss World pageant previously the pageant was part of the Miss Nicaragua organization until 2013 when the current CEO Denis Dávila earn the franchise for Nicaragua to send delegates into the Miss World pageant. Ending 2024 Denis Dávila became talent acquisition of Miss Universe resulting in different national directors for the organization.

== Big Four representatives beauty pageants ==
=== Miss Nicaragua for Miss World ===
Note: The current franchise owner started the competition on 2013 and ends in 2024.

Year	State	Miss Mundo Nicaragua	Placement at Miss World	Special Awards	Notes
2026	Matagalpa	Belén Cáceres	Unplaced
2025	León	Virmania Rodríguez	Unplaced	Top 32 at Miss World Sport
2024	Granada	Julia Aguilar	Assumed Miss World Nicaragua 2024 but did not compete due to personal reason
2024	Jinotega	Ismeli Jarquín	Originally Miss World Nicaragua 2024 due to personal reasons declined for the title of Miss World Nicaragua.
2023	Nueva Segovia	Mariela Cerros	Unplaced	Top 32 at Miss World Sport
2023	Estelí	Daniela de Smet	Originally Miss World Nicaragua 2022, she was supposed to represent Nicaragua at Miss World 2024. Due to date changes, de Smet declined to compete at the Miss World pageant.
2022	Miss World 2021 was rescheduled to 16 March 2022 due to the COVID-19 pandemic outbreak in Puerto Rico, no edition started in 2022
2021	Managua	Sheynnis Palacios	Top 40	Winner – Head-to-Head Challenge (Rounds 1 and 2); Top 13 at Miss World Top Model; Top 28 at Beauty With a Purpose	Later Miss Universe 2023
2020	Due to the impact of COVID-19 pandemic, no competition held
2019	Carazo	María Teresa Cortez	Unplaced	Top 32 at Miss World Sport
2018	Boaco	Yoselin Gómez	Unplaced	Top 18 Miss World Talent
2017	Rivas	América Monserrath Allen	Unplaced
2016	Masaya	María Laura Ramírez	Unplaced
2015	Masaya	Stefanía Alemán Cerda	Unplaced	Top 24 at Miss World Sport; Top 10 at Beauty With a Purpose
2014	Rivas	Yumara López †	Unplaced
2014	Managua	María Esther Cortés	Originally Miss World Nicaragua 2014 she declined represent Nicaragua at Miss World 2014. Due to no personal reasons.
2013	Nueva Segovia	Luz Mery Decena	Unplaced	Top 20 at Miss World Sport and Fitness	First titleholder under Denis Dávila directorship
2013	Chinandega	Adriana Paniagua	Originally Miss World Nicaragua 2013 she declined represent Nicaragua at Miss World 2013. Due to no full preparation.		Later Miss Nicaragua 2018
2012	Granada	Lauren Lawson	Unplaced		Last titleholder under Miss Nicaragua
2011	Matagalpa	Darling Trujillo	Unplaced
Did not compete between 2006–2010
2005	Managua	Johanna Madrigal	Unplaced
2004	Masaya	Anielka Sánchez	Unplaced
2003	South Caribbean Coast	Hailey Britton Brooks	Unplaced
2002	León	Hazel Calderón	Unplaced
2001	Managua	Ligia Argüello Roa	Top 5	Miss World Americas
Did not compete between 1999–2000
1998	Managua	Claudia Patricia Alaniz	Unplaced
Did not compete between 1978–1998
1977	Rivas	Beatriz Obregón	Unplaced
1976	Did not compete
1975	Managua	Auxiliadora Paguaga	Unplaced
1974	León	Francis Duarte de León	Unplaced
Did not compete between 1972–1973
1971	Managua	Soraya Herrera Chávez	Unplaced
1970	Managua	Evangelina Lacayo	Unplaced
1969	Matagalpa	Carlota Brenes	Unplaced
1968	Matagalpa	Margine Davidson Morales	Top 7
Did not compete between 1965–1967
1964	Masaya	Sandra Correa	Unplaced
Did not compete between 1962–1963
1961	Granada	Thelma Arana	Unplaced
1960	León	Carmen Isabel Recalde	Unplaced
Did not compete between 1951–1959

=== Miss Nicaragua for Miss Cosmo ===
Note: The current franchise owner started the competition on 2024.

Year	State	Miss Cosmo Nicaragua	Placement at Miss Cosmo	Special Awards	Notes
2026	Managua	Milagros López	TBD	TBD	TBD
2025	Rivas	Marian Rodríguez	Unplaced
2024	Granada	Julia Aguilar	Unplaced

=== Mister Nicaragua for Mister World ===
Year	State	Mister Mundo Nicaragua	Placement	Special Award / Title
2024	Managua	Erlin Ayerdis	Unplaced	Top 35 at Talent; Top 20 at Best National Costume
2024	Chontales	Hanniel Espinoza	Originally Mister World Nicaragua 2024 due to personal reasons declined for the title of Mister World Nicaragua.	
2019	León	José Antonio Vallejos Pérez	Unplaced	Top 8 at Swimmers
2016	Managua	Edson Janyny Bonilla Álvarez	Unplaced	

== Other beauty pageants representatives ==
=== Nicaragua in Miss Orb International ===
Since 2022 the Miss Mundo Nicaragua selects the delegate of Nicaragua in Miss Orb International.

Year	Miss Nicaragua	Region	Placement	Special awards
2022	Mariela Cerros	Nueva Segovia	1st Runner-up	
2024	Adelaida Landero	Chinandega	Unplaced	

=== Nicaragua in the Reinado Internacional del Café ===
Since 2011 the Miss Mundo Nicaragua selects the delegate of Nicaragua in the Reinado Internacional del Café.

Year	Miss Nicaragua	Region	Placement	Special awards
1957	Leyla Bendaña	Managua		
Did not compete between 1958–1960
1961	María de Lourdes Valladares	Managua		
Did not compete between 1962–1975
1976	Morena Cuadra	Managua	1st Runner-up	
Did not compete between 1977–1998
1999	Abril Pérez	Managua		
Did not compete between 2000–2005
2006	Johanna Madrigal	Managua		
Did not compete between 2007–2013
2014	Stefanía Alemán	Masaya		
2015	Did not compete			
2016	María Laura Ramírez	Masaya		
2017	América Allen	Rivas		
2018	Yoselin Gómez	Boaco		
2019	Did not compete			
2020	Geyssell García	Chontales		
Did not compete between 2021–2022
2023	Daniela de Smet	Estelí		
2024	Fernanda Salazar	Managua		
2025	Karla González	Chontales		Best Face; Queen of conservation and biodiversity
2026	Daniela Majano	Granada		

== Previous franchises under Miss Mundo Nicaragua ==
=== Miss Continentes Unidos Nicaragua ===
- Declared as Winner
- Ended as runner-up
- Ended as one of the finalists or semifinalists
- : Ended as special awards winner

The Winner of Miss Continentes Unidos Nicaragua goes to Miss Continentes Unidos. After Miss Nicaragua losing the franchise. Sometimes the winner or other candidates will be able to compete at the pageant.

Year	Municipality	Miss Continentes Unidos Nicaragua	Placement at Miss Continentes Unidos	Special Awards
2022	South Caribbean Coast	Deneshka Loanie Betty López	Unplaced	
2020	Due to the impact of COVID-19 pandemic, no between 2020 and 2021			
2019	South Caribbean Coast	Katty Bello	Unplaced	
2018	Estelí	Sarahí Fuentes	Unplaced	
2017	León	Allison Herrera	Unplaced	
2016	North Caribbean Coast	Virginia Picado Chow	Unplaced	
2015	Granada	Ruth Martínez	Unplaced	
2014	Managua	Xilonem Quiñónez	Unplaced	
2013	Managua	Luviana Torres	Unplaced	
2012	Granada	Violeta Majano	Unplaced	
2011	Managua	Fátima Lucía Flores Bonilla	Unplaced	Miss Photogenic
2010	South Caribbean Coast	Scharllette Allen	Unplaced	
2009	Managua	Indiana Sánchez	Unplaced	
2008	Chinandega	Thelma Rodríguez	Unplaced	
2007	Managua	Xiomara Blandino	Unplaced	
2006	Managua	María Cristiana Frixione Mendoza	Unplaced	

=== Nicaragua in Miss Global Charity Queen International ===
Since 2015 the Miss Mundo Nicaragua selects the delegate of Nicaragua in the Miss Global Charity Queen International.

Year	Miss Nicaragua	Region	Placement	Special awards
2015	Christiam López	León		
2017	Ana Belén Abud Rodríguez	Managua		
2018	María Laura Ramírez	Masaya		Best National Costume (1st Runner-up)

=== Nicaragua in Face of Beauty International ===
Since 2018 the Miss Mundo Nicaragua selects the delegate of Nicaragua in Face of Beauty International.

Year	Miss Nicaragua	Region	Placement	Special awards
2018	Geyssell Lined García Navarrete	Chontales	2nd Runner-up	Best catwalk in a bathing suit

== See also ==
- Miss Universe Nicaragua
- Señorita Nicaragua
