= Verónica Iglesias =

Nicaraguan beauty pageant winner

- Born: Granada, Nicaragua
- Beauty pageant titleholder
- Title: Miss International Nicaragua 2025
- Major competitions: Miss International Nicaragua 2025; (Winner); Miss International 2025; (Top 10)

Verónica Iglesias is a Nicaraguan television host and beauty pageant titleholder who was crowned Miss International Nicaragua 2025 and represented Nicaragua at Miss International 2025 in Japan and later reached the Top 10.

== Pageantry ==
=== Miss International Nicaragua ===
Iglesias represented her hometown of Granada at Miss International Nicaragua 2025. She was crowned the winner on March 24, 2025.

=== Miss International ===
After winning her title of Miss International Nicaragua, she represented Nicaragua at the 63rd edition of the Miss International pageant. Iglesias ended up placing in the Top 10.

Awards and achievements
Preceded by Mariela Cerros	Miss International Nicaragua; 2025	Succeeded by Incumbent
