= History of rail transport in Nicaragua =

This article is part of the history of rail transport by country series

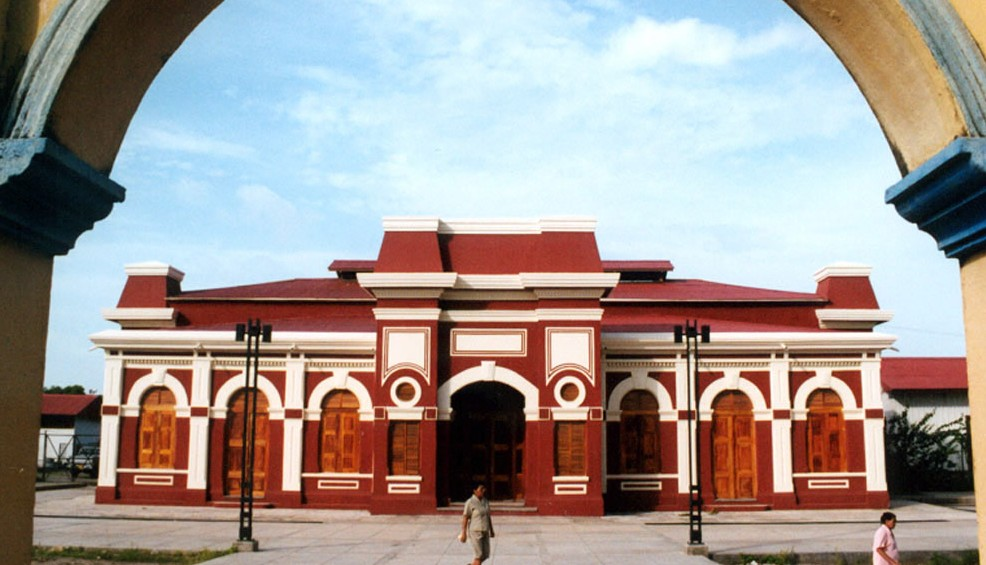
Granada station building

The history of rail transport in Nicaragua began in 1860s, with the first plans for a railway in Nicaragua. The first line was opened in 1882. In the past, there were 1,067 mm (3 ft 6 in) gauge railways on the Pacific coast, connecting major cities. A private 1,435 mm (4 ft 8 1/2 in) gauge line operated on the Atlantic coast.

However, as of 2006, there were no longer any trains in Nicaragua. All traffic has been suspended since September 2001, ending several decades of a steady decline.

== Beginnings ==
For an easier understanding, follow the narrative on a map.

First projects for the construction of railways in Nicaragua were considered in the 1860s. In 1873, the government signed contracts with J. E. Hollembeck & Co. for building a line between Managua and Granada, and with Enrique Meiggs Keith for a line from Corinto to León. However, there were no practical results.

In 1876, President Pedro Joaquín Chamorro Alfaro enacted a decree, calling for a construction of a railway from Corinto via Chinandega and León to the nearest port on Lake Managua (later Western division). The railway would be connected to the capital through steamboats. Another section of railway (later Eastern division) should be built from Managua to Granada via Masaya or along the Tipitapa river.

Works on the Western division started in 1878. The first engine arrived at Chinandega in November 1880, and the first segment – Corinto to Chinadega – was completed and put into operation March 10, 1882. Construction continued and in 1883, the railway reached the city of León and León Viejo, a settlement on the bank of Lago de Managua. A new city, Puerto Momotombo, was inaugurated in 1884 to serve the port and transshipment station. The western division had 93 kilometres (58 mi) of the main line plus 5.5 km (3 1/2 mi) of secondary lines.

The construction of the Eastern division commenced from Managua in 1883. In 1884, the line reached Masaya and the construction was completed in 1886 in Granada. The division had 50 km (31 mi) of main line, plus 3 km (2 mi) of secondary lines.

In 1885, a contract was signed for the construction of Ferrocarril a Los Pueblos de Carazo, branching from the "Eastern division" in Masaya towards Diriamba, across an area of coffee farming. The line, 43.5 km (27 mi) long and including a 30 m (98 ft) long tunnel, was completed in 1887.

In 1895–1898, a branch Chinandega - El Viejo (7.7 km or 4 3/4 mi) extended from the Western division.

== Twentieth century ==
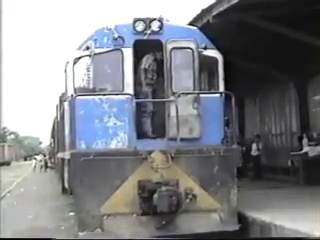
Nicaragua Railways General Electric diesel locomotive

The Central division, connecting the Western and Eastern divisions between La Paz Vieja and Managua, was constructed from 1900 to 1902. This made obsolete the steamboat connection across Lago de Managua and the branch to Puerto Momotombo was abandoned in 1903.

There were plans to extend the network to the Atlantic coast. A contract was signed in 1903. The line should have stretched 288 km (179 mi) from San Miguelito (a port at Lake Nicaragua) through a difficult terrain to Monkey Point at the Caribbean coast. In 1909, after constructing about 16 km (10 mi) of tracks, the works stopped and never resumed again. Nicaraguan railways never connected both coasts.

Ferrocarril del Ingenio San Antonio connected with the national network at Chichigalpa, and ran for 17 kilometres (11 mi) to Puerto Esparta. The section between Chichigalpa and Ingenio San Antonio was the last section of line in use in the country.

Private investors built the Ferrocarril de la Bragman's Bluff, an isolated 100-kilometre-long (60 mi) standard gauge line between Puerto Cabezas and Cocoland. It operated from 1925 until 1955 and was used mainly for a transport of lumber and bananas. The route is shown on a US Marine Corps tracing of a Standard Fruit & Steamship Corporation map of 1928 (Bragman's Bluff Division). The dismantled route is shown on a series of 1:50,000 maps held by / published online by The University of Texas under the Perry-Castañeda Library (PCL) Map Collection website (ref Puerto Cabezas (topographic) Sheet 3558iii).

An isolated mining tramway operated to serve the Eden Mine in the Pis Pis area on the Turky River. This is shown as an inset on the Standard Fruit & Steamship Corporation map of 1928 (Bragman's Bluff Division). Other minor mine tramways are also believed to have existed.

Another private line served the Wawa Commercial Estate. This operated from Israwas (Isnahuas / Isnawas) on the navigable Rio Kukalaya (Rio Cucalaya) upriver to the Yacaltara area. The route is shown on a US Marine Corps tracing of a Standard Fruit & Steamship Corporation map of 1928 (Bragmam Buuff Division [sic]). A different map from that referred to in the preceding paragraphs.

Other isolated lines may have existed on the Rio Grande de Matgalpa. The 1925 map on this wikipedia page shows a Cuyamel Fruit Company line at Barrera. Slightly further east an 1894 Mosquito Coast map, held by the Library of Congress, shows Emery's Railroad. Emery had lumber concessions in the area.

The amended 1898 contract stipulated that Emery would build 50 mi (80 km) of railway for his own use and that this work would meet various specifications in terms of design, rolling stock, warehouses, water towers, rail bed, rail quality, width of tracks, and so on. The railway would revert to Nicaragua at the end of the 15 year period. The line was to run from Rio Grande to Nuringues, or Laguna de Perlas River. Construction began from camp No. 9 near La Cruz and went towards the Department of Matagalpa. (see reference 24 of cited article)

Additional lines on the Pacific coast were built in the subsequent decades. In 1940, the National railways consisted of the following lines:

- (Nicaragua) Corinto - Granada 191.98 km (119.29 mi)
- Masaya - Diriamba 43.49 km (27.02 mi)
- León - El Sauce 72.00 km (44.74 mi)
- San Jorge - San Juan del Sur 31.00 km (19.26 mi)
- Chinandega - Puerto Morazán 31.00 km (19.26 mi)
- El Sauce - Río Grande 13.00 km (8.08 mi)

Total: 382.48 km (237.66 mi)

In the 1960s and 1970s, the railway went into a decline, exacerbated further by the Managua earthquake of 1972. The government reacted to this by constructing a 25.4 km (15.8 mi) branch from Ceiba Mocha to Puerto Somoza (now Puerto Sandino) in 1976. This significantly increased productive operations and revenues, but did not reverse the long-term trend. Governmental subsidies were steadily increasing and passenger transport declining. The oldest line Corinto - León was abandoned in 1982 when floods damaged tracks.

In 1993, there were still 373 km (232 mi) of 1,067 mm (3 ft 6 in) narrow gauge tracks in the Pacific region and isolated 3 km (1.9 mi) of 1,435 mm (4 ft 8 1/2 in) standard gauge line at Puerto Cabezas in the Caribbean. Several trains a day carried passengers south from Managua to Granada, or north from the capital to León.

== Closure ==
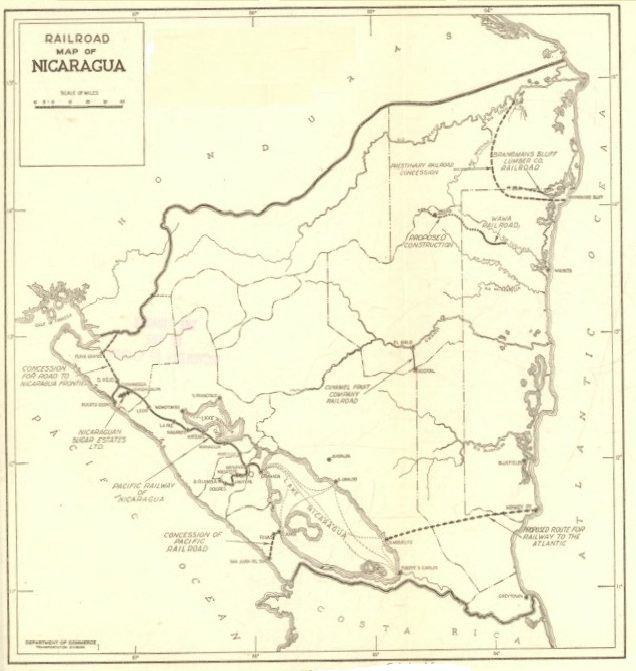
Rail map as of 1925

Most lines were shut down on December 31, 1993 by President Violeta Chamorro who ordered the rolling stock and rail demolished and sold for scrap. The last one – 6 km (3.7 mi) from Chichigalpa to Ing. S. Antonio – was decommissioned in September 2001.

== Future plans ==
Nicaragua will have railway lines from Managua to Corinto via León and railway lines to San Juan del Sur via Masaya. Feasibility studies are currently being conducted by Yapi Merkezi and Ministry of Transport and Infrastructure.

== See also ==
- History of Nicaragua
- Rail transport in Nicaragua
