= Nicaragua (disambiguation) =

Nicaragua is a country in Central America.

Nicaragua may also refer to:

- "Nicaragua" (anthem), the national anthem of Nicaragua from 1876 to 1889
- Nicaragua (film), the Philippines version of the 1988 film Striker
- Nicaragua national football team, the official football team of Nicaragua
- Lake Nicaragua, a freshwater lake in Nicaragua and the largest lake in Central America

== See also ==
- Nicaraguan (disambiguation)
