= National symbols of Nicaragua =

National symbols of Nicaragua are the symbols that are used in Nicaragua and abroad to represent the country and its people.

== National symbols ==
=== Flag ===
Flag of Nicaragua

The flag of Nicaragua was adopted in 1971 and is based on the former flag of the United States of Central America. The colors of the Nicaraguan flag originate from the flag of the former federation of the United Provinces of Central America. The two blue stripes represented the Pacific Ocean and Caribbean Sea; while white symbolizes peace. A modern interpretation indicates that the color blue symbolizes justice and loyalty.

=== Coat of arms ===
Nicaragua's coat of arms

The Nicaraguan Coat of Arms has undergone many changes since its adoption in 1823, the most recent version was introduced in 1971. The triangle means equality, the rainbow means liberty and the five volcanoes express the union and brotherhood of all five Central American countries.

=== Anthem ===
The national anthem, Salve a ti, Nicaragua, was approved October 20, 1939, and officially adopted August 25, 1971. The lyrics were written by Salomon Ibarra Mayorga. The Nicaraguan national anthem is the shortest in the Americas and is the only one that does not proclaim war. It was sung for the first time on December 16, 1918.

=== Flower ===
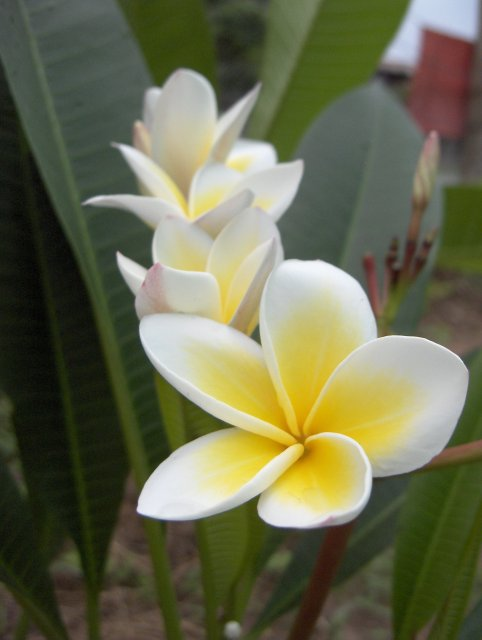
The Sacuanjoche

The national flower is known as the sacuanjoche. The sacuanjoche flower (Plumeria) grows on a conical tree that flowers around May. Sacuanjoche flowers are most fragrant at night in order to lure sphinx moths to pollinate them. The flowers have no nectar, and simply dupe their pollinators.

=== Tree ===
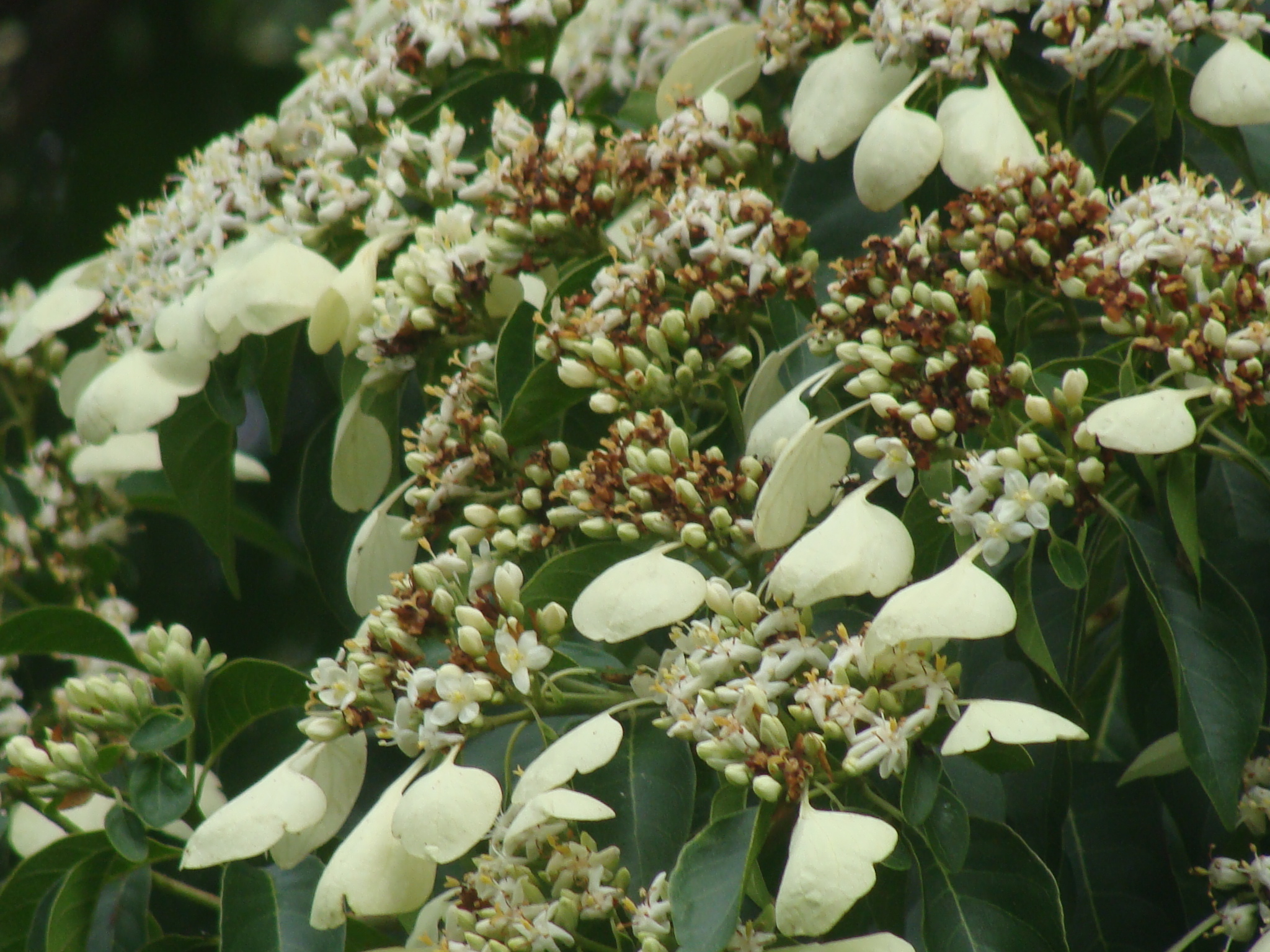
Madroño

The national tree is the Madroño (Calycophyllum candidissimum; in English, also known as degame, lemonwood, etc.).

=== Bird ===
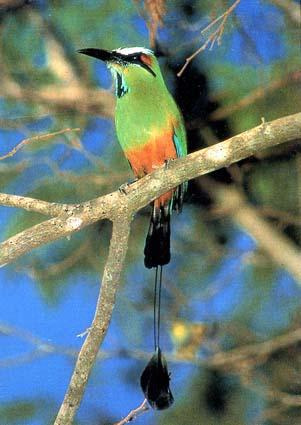
Guardabarranco (Eumomota superciliosa). The national bird of El Salvador and Nicaragua

The national bird of Nicaragua is the Guardabarranco. It has a mostly green body with a rufous back and belly. There is a bright blue stripe above the eye and a blue-bordered black patch on the throat. The flight feathers and upperside of the tail are blue. The tips of the tail feathers are shaped like rackets and the bare feather shafts are longer than in other motmots

Guardabarrancos can be seen in forests throughout Nicaragua, mostly in the southwest of the country. Their habitat is not limited by city boundaries, as this bird can even be seen in Nicaragua's capital city, Managua.
