= Marcha Roberto Sacasa =

Former national anthem of Nicaragua

- Sheet music of the anthem
- Former national anthem of Nicaragua
- Music: Alejandro Cousin
- Adopted: 1889
- Relinquished: 1893
- Preceded by: "Nicaragua"
- Succeeded by: "Hermosa Soberana"

Audio sample
- “Marcha Roberto Sacasa” (instrumental): file; help

“Marcha Roberto Sacasa” was the national anthem of Nicaragua adopted in 1889 after the assumption of presidency by Roberto Sacasa. It was composed by Alejandro Cousin and it had no words. It was abolished after the liberal revolution of 1893, when it was replaced by the new national anthem Hermosa Soberana.

Due to its peaceful character, political opponents of President Roberto Sacasa (nicknamed “El Palomo”) called this anthem by the nickname “El Himno de los Palomos” (The Anthem of the Doves).
