= Salomón Ibarra Mayorga =

Nicaraguan poet

Salomón Ibarra Mayorga (September 8, 1887 – October 2, 1985) was a Nicaraguan poet, political thinker, and the lyricist of "Salve a ti, Nicaragua", the Nicaraguan national anthem. His poetry is simple, expressive, musical in quality, and patriotic. A strong proponent of peace and democracy, he is honored in Nicaragua for his anti-interventionist stance and his patriotism.

== Early life and family ==
He was born in the municipality of Chinandega, Chinandega department, to Felipe Ibarra and Eloísa Mayorga. His father was an attorney, philologist, and poet, and had been a teacher of the poet Rubén Darío. His mother came from a distinguished family whose membership included many poets and writers. Ibarra Mayorga first studied at the Seminario Conciliar San Ramón in the city of León. In 1909, he began work as the accountant of the Colegio Mercantil de Occidente. In 1928, he married Angelina Mejía, and the pair had three children, Eloísa, Gloria, and Salomón.Damaris Ibarra is his great great grand daughter (2002-current)

== Political activities ==
In 1911, Ibarra Mayorga founded El Tiempo, the only liberal newspaper that criticized the regime of Juan José Estrada. On May 14 of the same year, he was hurt in an attack he believed to have been orchestrated by the anti-intellectual Carlos Pasos. The attack drove him to join the Revolución Constitucionalista Liberal, which engaged in violent struggle against the dictatorship of Adolfo Díaz and militated against United States intervention. As a result of his efforts, he was exiled to Honduras. For the next fifteen years, he directed the Central American operations of the Singer Corporation.

== National anthem ==
In 1918, under the nom de plume Rómulo, he entered the contest held by the government of President Emiliano Chamorro to determine the lyrics of the Nicaraguan national anthem. The composition of the lyrics was a difficult task, given the United States occupation of the country. Ibarra Mayorga had to be careful to neither anger the occupiers, nor to "wound the national dignity" by making reference to the occupation. Nonetheless, he wanted to write words that would reflect the popular anti-interventionist sentiment of his compatriots.

In his 1955 Monografía de Nicaragua, which details the story of the anthem's composition, he writes,

¨Ciertamente la primera estrofa del Himno, por la sencillez del asunto, fue concebida fácilmente como una expresión del ansia nacional que pedía paz y trabajo después de una enconada lucha fraticida. Pero esto no era para satisfacer los impulsos del alma, los anhelos del patriotismo.¨ (Certainly the first stanza of the Anthem, due to the delicacy of the issue, was conceived easily as an expression of the national longing that was asking for peace and work after an exasperating fratricidal struggle. But this wasn't everything to satisfy the impulses of the soul, the desires of patriotism.)

He won the contest, but political turmoil prevented the lyrics from becoming official until 1939, when President Anastasio Somoza García officialized them with by executive order.

== Return to Nicaragua ==
In 1935, he was recalled to Nicaragua by President Juan Bautista Sacasa to direct the national credit bureau, a post he held until 1946.

He was also secretary of the local social assistance league in Managua, president of the Nicaraguan section of the Asociación de Escritores y Artistas Americanos (American Association of Writers and Artists), president of the Nicaraguan-Israeli Cultural Institute, and president of the Managua Rotary Club.

In 1949, he was awarded the Rubén Darío National Prize by the Nicaraguan Teachers' Union.

== Later life, death, and legacy ==
Following the 1972 Managua earthquake, he took refuge in Honduras and remained there for the next twelve years, visiting Nicaragua often.

In 1975, he published a volume of poetry entitled "Gris".

He died in 1985 in Tegucigalpa, leaving a poem entitled "Ruego" asking his survivors to drape a Nicaraguan flag over his heart. And in accordance with his wish to have his remains repatriated, as related in his poem "La Canción del Ausente", Nicaraguan President Arnoldo Alemán ordered the exhumation and reburial of his ashes on September 12, 2000. They now rest in the Palacio Nacional de la Cultura in Managua. A school in Tipitapa, Managua department is named in his honor, as is the city plaza in Chinandega.

== Bibliography ==
- Ibarra Mayorga, Salomón (1955). Monografía de Nicaragua.
- Ibarra Mayorga, Salomón (1975). Gris.
