= Nicaragua (anthem) =

- Former national anthem of Nicaragua
- Lyrics: Fernando Álvarez
- Music: José del Carmen Vega
- Adopted: 1876
- Relinquished: 1889
- Succeeded by: "Marcha Roberto Sacasa"

Audio sample
- “Nicaragua” (instrumental): file; help

“Nicaragua” or “La patriótica” was the first national anthem of Nicaragua, premiered during a tertulia in Masaya in 1876 and adopted by the government of Pedro Joaquín Chamorro Alfaro in the same year. It was composed by José del Carmen Vega, with lyrics written by Fernando Álvarez. It was used until 1889, when it was replaced by Marcha Roberto Sacasa.

During the early years of José Santos Zelaya’s administration, readoption of the music of this anthem was taken into consideration, but ultimately a different anthem, Hermosa Soberana, has been adopted.

== Lyrics ==
Spanish original
English translation
Version I
Version II
Version I

Coro:
Soldados, ciudadanos, a las armas
esgrimid las espadas con valor;
que más vale morir independientes
a vivir subyugados en la opresión.

I
Hoy se lanza la patria querida
sobre un campo de gloria inmortal,
hoy alzando su frente abatida,
aniquila el poder colonial

De septiembre la luz se levanta
bella, pura, cual hija del sol,
y a su vista el íbero se espanta,
tiembla y cae el león español.

Coro

Coro:
Soldados, ciudadanos, a las armas,
a esgrimir las espadas con valor,
que más vale morir independiente
que vivir subyugado a una prisión.

I
Hoy se lanza mi patria querida
sobre el campo de gloria inmortal,
hoy, alzando su frente abatida
que aniquila el poder colonial.

De setiembre la luz se levanta
linda y pura cual hija del Sol,
y a su vísta el Ibero se espanta,
tiembla y calla el León Español.

Coro

II
No hay Señores, no hay Nobles ni Reyes,
sólo impera la Santa Igualdad,
sólo súbditos hay de las leyes,
sin mirar clase, rango, ni edad.

La virtud solamente o el vicio
dan o quitan al hombre el honor,
el que vive de un útil oficio
al ocioso será superior.

Coro

Chorus:
To arms, citizen soldiers,
Wield your swords with courage,
It is better to die independent
Than to live under oppression.

I
Today, the beloved patria delivers itself
Over a field of immortal glory,
Today, raising a downcast brow,
It destroys the colonial power.

From September, the light rises
Beautiful, pure, that daughter of the sun,
And her sight scares the Iberian,
The Spanish lion trembles and falls.

Chorus
