= Tipitapa River =

River in Nicaragua

The Tipitapa River (Río Tipitapa) is a river in Nicaragua that connects Lake Managua to Lake Nicaragua. Its flow is seasonally variable, and when Lake Managua, which is situated about ten meters higher than Lake Nicaragua, experiences high water levels (usually in the rainy season), the waters of the Tipitapa can rise, resulting in floods that affect bordering towns such as Tipitapa, which is situated on the river, near Lake Managua.

At its origin, the river is narrow and as it reaches mid-length, it widens and there are large swamps and lagoons covered with lush vegetation.
