= Rail transport in Nicaragua =

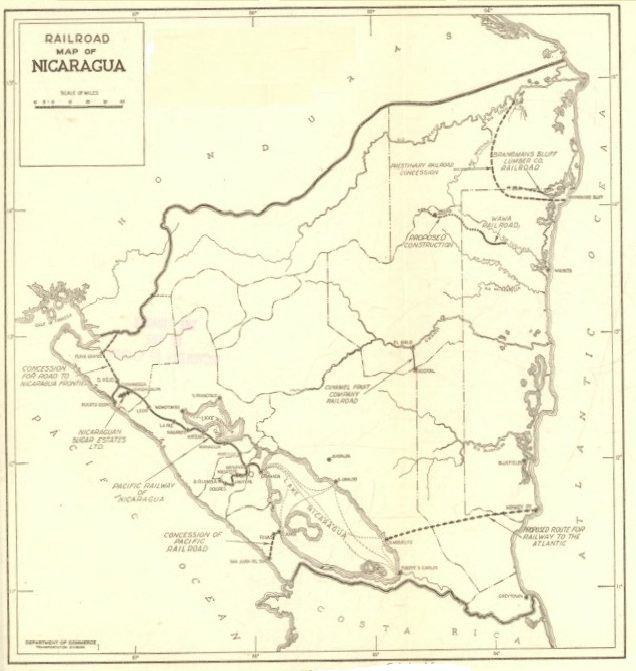
Rail map as of 1925

As of 2012, there is no rail transport in Nicaragua. All traffic has been suspended since September 2001, ending several decades of a steady decline. In the past, there were 3 ft 6 in (1,067 mm) gauge railroads on the Pacific coast, connecting major cities. A private 4 ft 8 1/2 in (1,435 mm) standard gauge line also formerly operated on the Atlantic coast.

== In fiction ==
Ferrocarril del Pacífico de Nicaragua uses F6 steam locomotive and EP-2 electric locomotive in openBVE.

== See also ==
- History of rail transport in Nicaragua
- Rail transport by country
- Rail transport
- Nicaragua
- Transportation in Nicaragua
