= León Viejo =

Archaeological site in Nicaragua

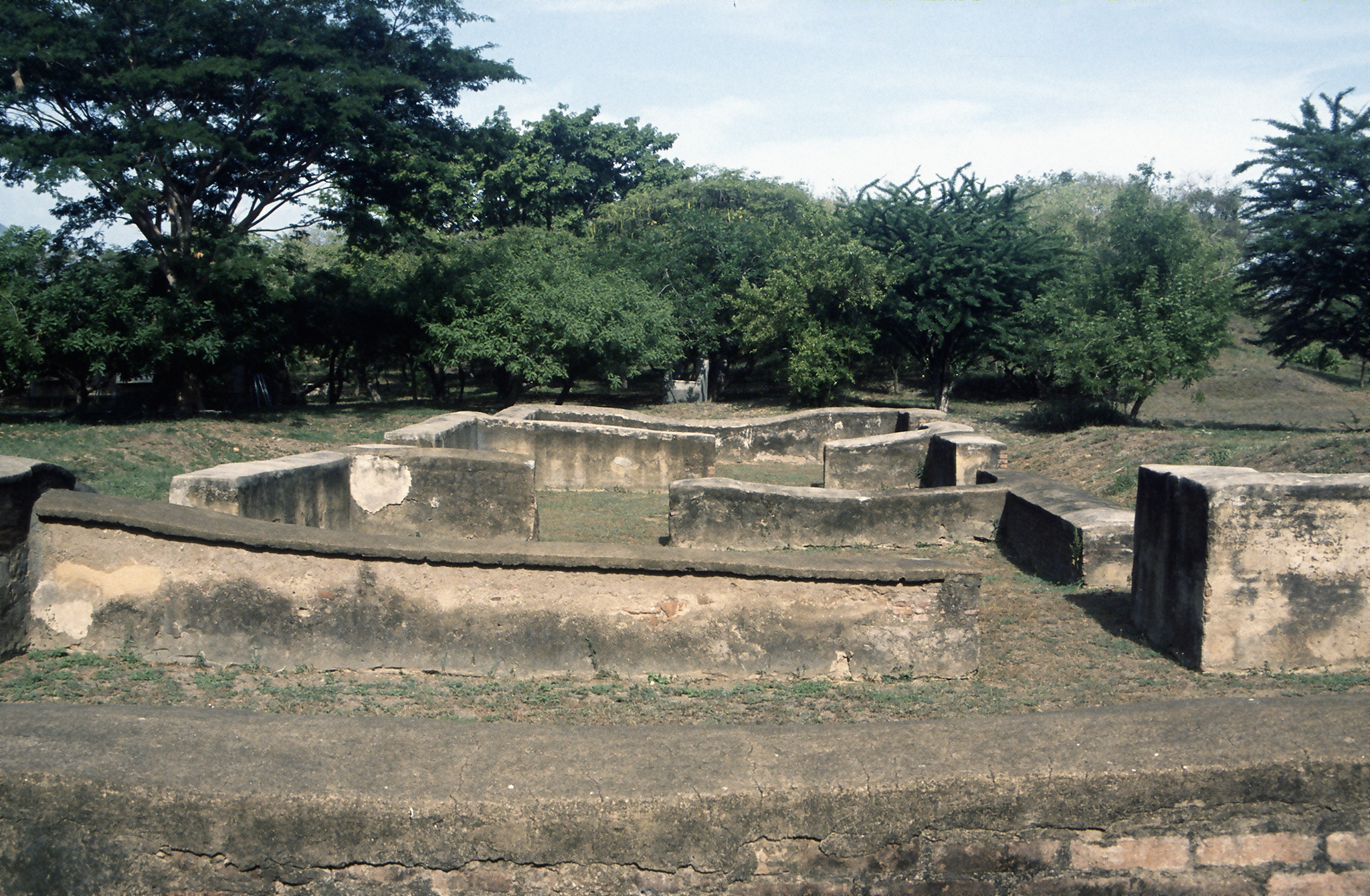
- Ruins of León Viejo, 2004

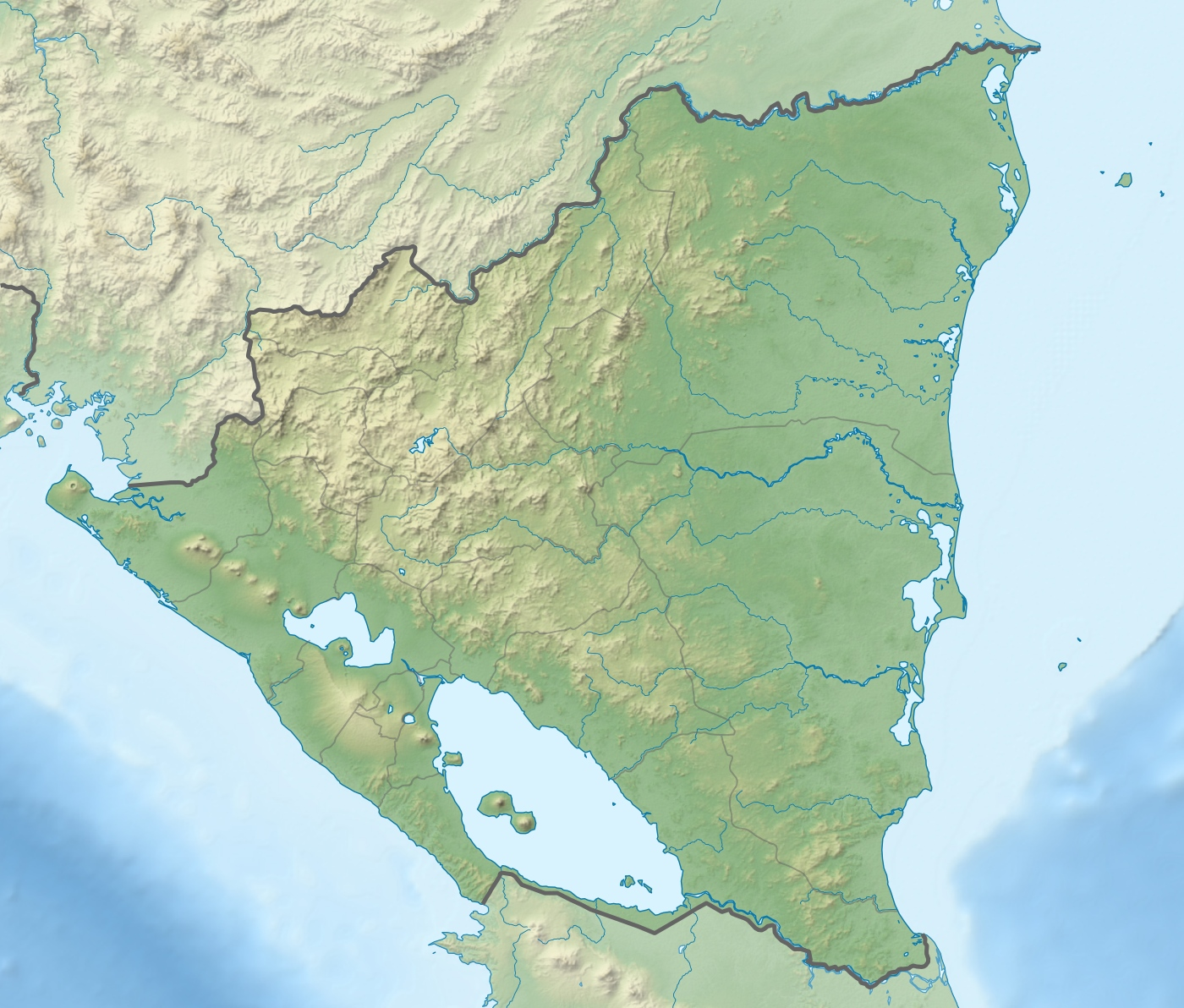
- Location within Nicaragua
- 12°24′02″N 86°37′04″W
- Location: Near La Paz Centro

History
- Founded: June 15, 1524

UNESCO World Heritage Site
- Official name: Ruins of León Viejo
- Type: Cultural
- Criteria: (iii)(iv)
- Designated: 2000 (24th session)
- Reference no.: 613rev
- Region: Latin America and the Caribbean

Ruins of León Viejo is a World Heritage Site in Nicaragua. It was the original location of León. It is the present location of the town of Puerto Momotombo in the Municipality of La Paz Centro of the Department of León. It is administered by the Instituto Nicaragüense de Cultura (Nicaraguan Institute of Culture).

León Viejo was founded on June 15, 1524, by the Spanish conquistador, Francisco Hernández de Córdoba, who was decapitated at the town's Plaza Mayor (Main Square) in 1526 by governor Pedrarias Dávila, his Lieutenant.

Settled by Spanish colonists, León Viejo originally had a native population of about 15,000 and it is located on the southwestern banks of Lago de Xolotlán or Lago de Managua (Lake Xolotlán or Managua), south of the volcano Momotombo. The area suffered frequent volcanic activity, culminating in the earthquakes of 1594 and 1610.

The city was not destroyed by the 1610 quake. However, due to the damage caused to the infrastructure and the seismic activity, the settlers held a referendum and decided to relocate the city to its present location, about 30 kilometres (20 mi) to the west. Subsequently, the old city was gradually buried by the continuous expulsions of ash and volcanic stone coming from Momotombo.

The ruins of León Viejo were discovered in 1967 and excavations begun the following year revealing that the city had a similar layout to other cities in America at that time, laid out on a grid system with a main square located at its center. León Viejo occupies an approximate area of 800 m x 500 m. Around the Plaza Mayor and on the surrounding streets, 16 ruins have been partially restored.

The city had three monasteries: "La Merced", "San Pedro", and "San Francisco", which remained active until October, 1559. The ruins of La Merced and San Pedro have been identified, however they have been damaged by natural disasters over the years. In May 1982 tropical storm Alleta wasted the walls of the city. In October 1988 Hurricane Joan caused new damages to the ruins, and in October 1998 Hurricane Mitch affected an estimated 40% of the site, damaging several houses, La Merced convent, and La Fortaleza.

León Viejo is the only 16th-century colonial city in America that has never suffered city-planning alterations during its history. This fact was the main argument in the request to the UNESCO when it was declared a World Heritage Site in 2000.

== History of local archaeology ==
The conquistadors found the country occupied by numerous entrepreneurial towns practicing the arts and peaceful industries. Dr. Berendt, a great explorer and scholar of aboriginal people of Central America, in light of philological results obtained by himself and by American diplomat Ephraim George Squier (1849), as well as traditions preserved mainly by Oviedo, Torquemada and Herrera, believed that the Cholutecas, Chorotega, Dirianes and Orotiñas were descendants of the people who migrated from Cholula, Mexico. These people occupied the greater part of the country from the Gulf of Fonseca to Nicoya, its territorial continuity interrupted near the current city of Leon by the Marabios, and again by an Azteca colony occupying the narrowest part of the strip of land between the Pacific and Lake Nicaragua, as well as the islands of the Lake. The King and his latest national capital wore the name Nicarao (Conference read before the American geographical society, July 10, 1876, by Dr. C. H. Berendt). The former inhabitants of this region left abundant relics of their civilization in burial mounds, cemeteries, etc.

In 1987, Elphidio Ortega, Advisor to the Organization of American States (OAS), conducted 14 stratigraphic wells on the site. Contrary to previous researchers, he suggested that the colonial settlement was not located on the native site, but rather alongside a prehispanic town. Lourdes Dominguez, a Cuban national, also made investigations in 12 wells, both outside the limit of some structures from which obtained more 1100 pieces of ceramic evidence. After her research, Dominguez proposed the theory that León Viejo was built on a prehispanic settlement, as suggested by the site's abundance of ceramics. This theory came into contradiction with Elphidio Ortega, who concluded that the colonial city was established along an indigenous settlement, but not over it.

In 1996, Devora Ederman Cornavaca, postgraduate student at the University of California Los Angeles obtained permission from the Department of cultural heritage of the Nicaraguan Culture Institute (INC) to carry out excavations in León Viejo, aimed at studying the impact of the Spanish society on the native populations of the region. The first excavation was near the current city limits and found evidence of a possible smithy. The second was located on an agricultural parcel limited south with León Viejo, in what is now part of the site's buffer zone. Unfortunately, the final results report of this research period has not been published. However, Cornavaca states that the Spanish settlement was located outside of the native town of the area. (Archaeology of Ancient Mexico and Central America an Encyclopedia - Susan Toby Evans and David L. Webster. Pages: 401–402).

== Investigation ==
The anthropological research Department of Nicaragua National Museum (MNN) conducted excavations and archaeological explorations in León Viejo, digging 8×2 meter trenches oriented north to south.

Excavations recovered material consisted of ceramic, porcelain, metal, wildlife remains and human remains.

A fragment of a musical instrument, possibly a flute made from a human humerus, was found in association with a set of prehispanic materials. E. Espinoza, in his article on "Shamanism" in prehispanic Nicaragua, points out that the German archaeologist G. Haberland found, in a burial zone, a musical artifact associated with human remains that probably belonged to a shaman; hence, it is inferred that this type of object is linked to a ritual or ceremony.

In the cathedral, a prehispanic female skull with evidence of trepanation (a surgical intervention) was found—one of the few examples of trepanation recorded in the history of the Nicaraguan archaeology.

The site evidenced an abundance of pottery, stone artifacts of chalcedony and basalt, and fragments of prismatic knives (of obsidian, probably imported from multiple locations in the Central American region). This sheds light on prehispanic trade practices. Obsidian is a coveted raw material, utilized extensively for the production of domestic and ceremonial tools.

=== Funeral burials León Viejo ===
Found in the east sector of grid 3D, the first 20 cm, had previously been removed, this condition was observed in the next 40 cm, i.e., at the end of the second level. Morphologically, the soil is a mixture of volcanic sand, clay and degraded of bedrock dirt geologically known as pumice, which gives the dirt a white or yellowish color and a very soft texture.

Due to the soil characteristics, it proved impossible to define the morphology of the burial; no special arrangements were observed, only that the head rested on small volcanic stones (tufa).

The burial is atypical, the skull is on the south side as if looking at Momotombo mountain, or perhaps the Lake, the position in which the individual was laid is not well defined, his right hand has the ulna - radius - in the chest and the right hand ulna - radius on the facial bones as if covering the face, metacarpal bones and phalanges are associated with the clavicle and left scapulae. It is possible that the burial may be an extended burial and corpse has been buried when the body became stiff which is why the hand is on the face. The skull has a hole at the top of the left parietal caused by circular trepanation or surgery which was practiced on the bone to cure some illness. Furthermore, a set of holes caused by osteoporosis was observed through an electronic magnifying glass, the operation was performed in the same region of the skull (Personal communication with Dr. Henry Guerzten, Pathology Professor at the University of Virginia, USA)

The skeleton is quite complete and in acceptable preservation condition, according to biometric data obtained from the measurement of the skull bones ranges from 22 to 23 cm. and postcranial bones, the column including pelvis 55–56, femur 42, shinbone - fibula 34 cm, respectively, a height of between 1.50 and 155 was calculated approximately and bone anatomy infer that this is a young woman between 25 and 30 years of age, female. All dental parts are anatomically articulated and morphologically incisors teeth (spade-shaped) make us to infer that it is a specimen belonging to the Imabite people Chorotega indigenous population of the area. Over the pelvic region of the specimen a sacrum and coccyx and a lumbar vertebra were found, by the feet a package of bones was found that corresponds to the lower extremities. Near the head, bone remains belonging to the upper limbs of another individual were found, the perturbed human remains seem to correspond to a mature male adult.

With regard to the interpretation of the cultural context of this funerary burial, the burial space is not on a main altar, but another area of burial. Although this space is also considered a place privileged in the Church, it is difficult to infer whether the burial was disturbed during the different stages of construction of the cathedral, and there remains the possibility that the corpse has retained its place and position.

Archaeological evidence shows that there was disturbance of the human remains of other specimens, and not with the individual unearthed in grid 3D and was buried as looking at the volcano. If we talk about that it is an individual of the prehispanic population; then it is possible that the orientation of this person have some link with a ritual, a ceremonial act or a human sacrifice to honor one of their gods, the God of the mountain, the God of heights or the Momotombo volcano, prehispanic population feared these large volcanoes, but also paid tributes because they associated height to their gods, they believed that being in the highest places could come into contact with one of their gods.

The team resorted to data on burials types recorded both in Europe and America: as noted by Goodwin (1945), burial rites are closely delimited by customs, and the position and orientation of the body can help show the distribution of a cultural group, both in space as time. Variations in type of burial that are associated with a given people can contribute to determining differences in beliefs and customs, although as noted Ucko (1969), the ethnographic interpretation of burials can be a risky affair. That there were considerable variations in the type of burial even in prehistoric times is something that has been left clearly exposed Marija (1956), but the interpretation is not always easy.

The presence of stone artifacts is remarkable, as fragments of prismatic knives made of Obsidian (volcanic glass), reported chips of obsidian, chalcedony quartz, wildlife remains corresponding to small mammals, reptiles, birds and fish, part of these materials were associated with the human bones. Indigenous peoples that lived around the city, in what could have been the largest settlement around Imabite, with about 15 thousand people according to Oviedo.

=== Funerary Burials 2 ===
This second burial was located between the southern profile grid (C - 1A) and north grid profile (C - 1B) the skeleton has the body and head tilted slightly to the northwest, with the feet below the first step of the altar.

The burial was discovered below the human remains that correspond to the second Archbishop who arrived in Nicaragua in 1540 fray Francisco Mendavia, and was buried between 80 and 100 cm deep at the altar of the cathedral. The bones under Mendavia tomb were found at between 160 and 180 cm depth, the specimen was buried with the head toward the west side and face toward where the sun rises or facing the altar, the skeleton was anatomically articulated in a stretched position with both arms parallel to the femur, this burial form is not a Christian habit, it is more associated with prehispanic burials. Human remains are: properly articulated skull, clavicles, shoulder, humor bone, dices - radius, femurs, ulna - fibulae, cervical, thoracic and lumbar vertebrae, pelvis and bones of both hands and feet. Biometric data from the specimen are as follows: skull 23 cm, left femur 44 cm, right tibia 36 cm and the column including the pelvis 55 cm, infer that the height of the individual range between 1.55 and 1.60 cm approximately. According to the biological characteristics of bones and teeth appear to correspond to an adult individual female, 30–35 years of age approximately.

Most of the molars display a very marked wear that is typical of the prehispanic Nicaragua population, the upper molars are spent in the form of channel, attrition in the enamel and well-worn dental cusps, teeth of this specimen were compared with a collection of dental pieces belonging to archaeological excavations and indigenous people. Pathological problems were observed in two dental pieces, the molar inferior M1 on both sides have lesions caused by decay, by examination through an electronic magnifying observed a set of holes mainly in the proximal and distal parts of the long bones that were possibly affected by osteoporosis.

=== Archaeological artefacts recovered during excavations ===
During the excavation process several archaeological objects were found that corresponds to the pre-Hispanic period and a few to the colonial period, these artefacts were developed with different types of raw material, for example: lithic, human bones, clay, metal etc. The material have been systematically controlled and with great scientific rigor.

Fishing net artefacts made with fragments of pottery negative Usulután and oval shape, long 5.5 cm, level 6, depth 1.20 cm. C - 3D. Weight for fishing nets, one has circular measure 3.3 cm diameter and 5 cm wide and oval shaped fragment. Level 3, depth of 40–60 cm. C - 3 c. C - grid-2 level 1 c, a device was recorded with elaborate tip with red ceramic.

=== Pre-hispanic ceramic ===
The specimens found consists of 2239 ceramic remains, that include, monochrome ceramic, Lago Negro modeling, Red slip ware, Castle Esgrafiado, Sacasa striated, Managua Polychrome, Leo Punteado, Vallejo Polychrome, Usulután negative, colonial associated to Perulera and unclassified Perulera ceramic.

Within the material recorded during the excavation found a total of 17 ceramic monochromatic vessels with fabric impressions, they were distributed in the excavation.

Notes: The domestic pottery type monochrome vessels were examined through a magnifying glass and with X 40 Power. The test allowed to observe tissue impressions, noting that the printed fabric are different dimensions, i.e. size and shape, inferring that the cloth was of different thickness. Waste coal was observed and vegetal remains in clay, in some fragments could see varied pigmentation probably due to the temperature at which the utensils were used or the use in the kitchen. Ceramic vessels have been recorded with tissue impressions in the Managua area during the "Archaeology of the Managua Metropolitan area" project (Lange 1996, down: 43).

Test # 1: This probe test discovered an architectural well-shaped structure, consists of a hole of about a meter in diameter and was discovered at about 40 to 50 cm, depth. The discovered structure in the north wall of the building and in the surface part before the beginning of its circular shape, is made up of descendant levels in the form of steps, subsequently the well diameter enlarges as the depth increases. The structure was built on the rock or "matrix" known as pumice stone and was excavated to a depth of 2.30 m, it was undefined. The structure was not morphologically defined and is not known what its purpose was; to clarify these aspects further excavations must be made.

Lithic artifacts: Obsidian: the analysis was conducted on 175 artifacts recovered in the excavation at the main altar of the Cathedral ruins. The analytic process took into account technological morphology features, based on the quality of the material. As the sample did not have a large diversity of types and waste, the artifacts were classified into three basic categories: core fragments, chips and knives. The categories based on the stone tools are: tip points, knives, scrapers, axes, metates and grinding stone or pestle.

Knives: These are chips that have a length double than the width and parallel side edges. They are considered to be a superior cutting tool and associated with more complex sociocultural levels. The prismatic razors represent the technological apogee of implements because there are many complicated steps to make them (Finlayson in Lange, 1996. Page: 139).

A total 83 artifacts or prismatic knives were found, of which 50 seem to have been manufactured with raw materials from Ixtepeque Guatemala. 26 artifacts or fragments were identified as likely to have been manufactured with raw materials from the Chayal, El Salvador. 6 of the objects were possible manufactured with raw materials from the Güinope, Honduras. And one artifact is of undetermined origin. From the lithic waste (chips) 31 fragments were recorded of which 11 appear to be from Ixtepeque, Guatemala; 8 chips might come from the Chayal, El Salvador, and 12 chips seem to be raw material brought from Güinope, Honduras.

Quartz: A fragment was registered in the upper part of an archaeological artifact with anthropomorphic motifs, only displays a part of a face with one of his eyes, made with gray grey. The totals of quartz stone remains collected are 13, of which 3 were considered as fragments of possible artifacts and 10 are waste (chips).

Chalcedony: two items of this material were found, a complete spearhead with stalk, leaf shaped: measuring 3,8 cm long, wide on the proximal part 0,5 cm., 0,6 cm on the medial side and 0.1 to 0.2 cm, distal part. A leaf shaped arrowhead with its peduncle designed as if to be assembled on a wooden handle or other materials; the dimensions are: length 2.5 cm, width at proximal 0.6 cm, the medial part 0.8 cm, and distal part 0.2 cm.

This object is considered one of the most complete, well manufactured and defined, presents an excellent preservation state in its morphology; although some wear was noted in both sides, by which it is inferred that the cutting edge and its functional tips were used. This artifact is considered as a hunting weapon for smaller animals or determined for a more delicate and specific activity, its quality, design and finish allow inferring that it was made by people specialized in this type of tools. It was found with remains of pottery, animal and human prehispanic remains.

Lithic summary: 175 Lithic fragments were recovered and were classified as follows: 92 are considered as artifact fragments, 77 waste or chips, 4 core residues, 2 green stone residues. Two (2) of these instruments by its excellent condition were identified in the complete artifacts (material chalcedony) category, and as a result of importance, is the greater frequency of artifacts (fragments) of Obsidian prismatic knives (83), probably made with raw material from different sources in the Central America region. This allows an interpretation about trade, the exchange of raw materials or objects, which developed between the prehispanic settlements that inhabited the area of León Viejo (Imabite) and other towns of Central America.

Metal: A metal sample consists of a number of nails and fragments (63) of different shapes and size, pins (4), and undetermined metal residue. All these objects have evidence of rotten wood and decomposition (oxidation) evidence. There was a piece of metal shaped as a "key" 4.7 cm long.

Remains of animals at the main altar of the Cathedral The total animal samples in quantitative terms are very small, but even so, remains of several specimens were collected that provide valuable information to the research. The animal remains collected in the excavation were separated in the most accepted taxonomic order: mollusks (47), fish (53), reptiles (21), amphibians (2), birds (37), and mammals (287).

=== Hypotheses on the burials ===
The city of León de Imabite, known today as León Viejo, has been dated from the initial European contact (1522–1524) up to its abandonment in 1610. Archives information suggests the fact that in this area there was human occupation and was used as an Imabite native burial area. For example, seven (7) funeral burials unearthed at the main altar presented anthropological evidence and characteristic features of prehispanic burials. Furthermore, 4 unearthed specimens are below the soil of the Spanish occupation, that according to the stratigraphic geomorphology are registered at a depth ranging from .60 to 1.80 m. and one of burials was found in a funeral urn with animal remains inside.

Unfortunately, many of the skeletons were disturbed and were destroyed by diverse vandalism actions which have limited anthropological results. This also had the effect that human remains of several specimens appear scattered and intermingled with other materials during the investigation. Incisors (teeth) that are present among human osteology remains are spade shaped. This feature has a high frequency in the native populations and low frequency between most of the European population (Ubelaker, 1994: 26).

The anthropological biometric data of skulls, jaws and teeth of these specimens is evidence that they belong to the native population of the area. The presence of cultural materials totally predominant by prehispanic artifacts; such as 84 fragments of obsidian prismatic knives, weapons with well-defined carving (arrow), polychrome Managua type ceramic, monochrome ceramic, ceramic vessels with fabric impressions and wildlife remains, among others, are tangible evidence of the site occupation before the Spaniards arrival.

unearthed and exhumed human remains during four field seasons carried out in Leon Viejo on the three most important religious structures of colonial times, such as the Convent, Church and Cathedral de la Merced, the specimens are distributed between 11, 25 and 31 respectively, it was possible to determine the ontological remains of 67 individuals among men, women and children of different ages. Include Spaniards remains, between rulers and Viceroyalty religious.

Interpretation of Disperse Human Remains

These unearthed human remains specimens do not come from tombs or funeral burials, (osteology material disturbed by vandalism). During the excavation process a total of 25 burial were discovered of which most had articulated human bones and in some cases in packages of disjointed bones and skulls but feasible to locate anatomically.

The characteristics of these specimens, do not allow origin determination.

It was possible to diagnose pathological problems in some specimens mainly at dental level. In addition to the skeleton, considered most complete; a large number of human bone remains fragments were found scattered in the excavation, there is no specific origin, but it was possible to identify and associate with biological elements that allow inferring that they correspond to 5 male individuals, skeletal fractions that possibly belonged to 23 specimens of undetermined gender and 4 infants of different ages, all of which add to 32 individuals.

=== Conclusion ===
Based on laboratory tests performed on remnants with osteology emphasis is easy to determine the archaeological remains that predominate in the specimens come from prehispanic social groups inhabiting the place; while considering the burials found cultural historical importance

Another element that provides important data are the animal remains found associated with other cultural evidence. It is possible to assume the human consumption of different species belonging to zoological groups: such as large and small mammals, birds, reptiles, fish and mollusks. These records allow speculation on the ecosystems that existed in the area and therefore the possible diet of the inhabitants of the region during prehispanic and historical times.

In parallel to these studies, obtained a range of data related to architectural aspects and constructive systems of structures affected by the investigation. The presence of cultural materials belonging to the early colonial period in the site, in relation to utensils is almost zero, the sample is reduced to a few nail fragments from coffins and probably iron remains and nails used in the construction of buildings.

Archaeological records allow assuming that there are different chronologies for the León Viejo site. In considering results, conclusions and assumptions of research preceding ours, it is considered that archeologist Lourdes Dominguez conclusions, somehow match the results of the current research, in that the Spaniards built their buildings on cultural deposits or a settlement that belonged to the prehispanic population of the place. Not preclude the possibility that the Spaniards constructed and imposed their religious temple on a site where native population gathered and perhaps the main plaza of the native communities in the area.
