= Nicaraguan (disambiguation) =

Nicaraguan may refer to:

- Something of, from, or related to Nicaragua, the largest country in Central America
  - Nicaraguans, people from Nicaragua or of Nicaraguan descent or heritage. For information about the Nicaraguan people, see Demographics of Nicaragua and Culture of Nicaragua. For specific persons, see List of Nicaraguans.
  - Nicaraguan Spanish, the variety of Central American Spanish spoken in Nicaragua
    - Nicaraguan Sign Language
  - Nicaraguan cuisine
