= Momotombo =

Stratovolcano in Nicaragua

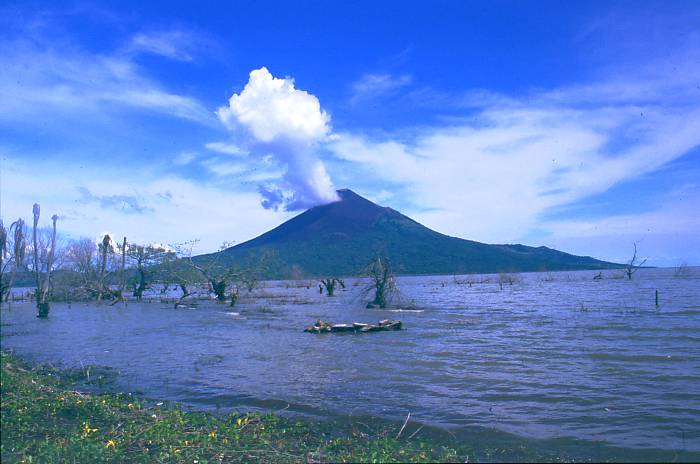
- The volcano in 2005

Highest point
- Elevation: 1,297 m (4,255 ft)
- Coordinates: 12°25′19″N 86°32′24″W

Geography
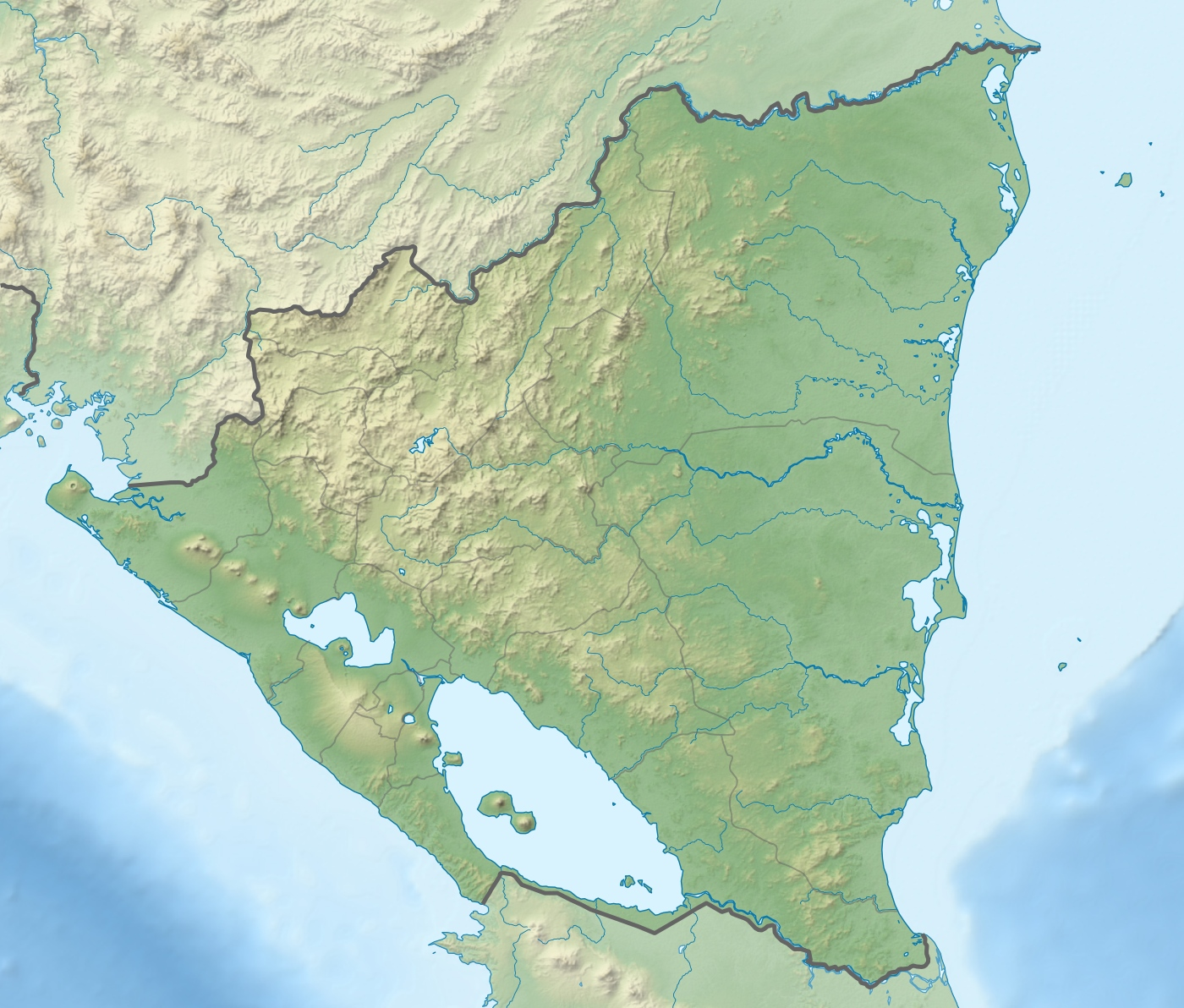
- Location within Nicaragua Location within North America
- Location: León Department, Nicaragua

Geology
- Mountain type: Stratovolcano
- Volcanic arc: Central America Volcanic Arc
- Last eruption: 28 February 2016

Climbing
- Easiest route: Hiking

Momotombo is a stratovolcano in Nicaragua, located near the city of León. It stands on the shores of Lake Managua. An eruption of the volcano in 1610 forced inhabitants of León, in the Spanish Empire, to relocate about 48 kilometres (30 mi) west. The ruins of the city are preserved at León Viejo. It also erupted in 1886, 1905 and most recently on 30 November 2015 and 28 February 2016.

Aerial view of Momotombo in 2006

The mountain is very symmetrical, and its form is a symbol of Nicaragua, cropping up in locations from matchboxes to revolutionary murals. This volcano was also very popular before World War I began. Many tourists visited, especially in 1904, one year before the eruption. The Nicaraguan poet Rubén Darío wrote the poem "Momotombo" in its honour.

A major geothermal field is located on the southern flank of the volcano. To climb the mountain, with a permit, cross through the geothermal powerplant and follow an easily marked trail through the treeline. Due to the active nature of the volcano, as well as the threat of landslides, the route from the treeline to the top is constantly changing. The quickest way is straight up, through the small avalanche paths.

It has a younger cone: Momotombito, which is inside of Lake Managua.

== See also ==
- List of volcanoes in Nicaragua
