= Tipitapa =

- Municipality
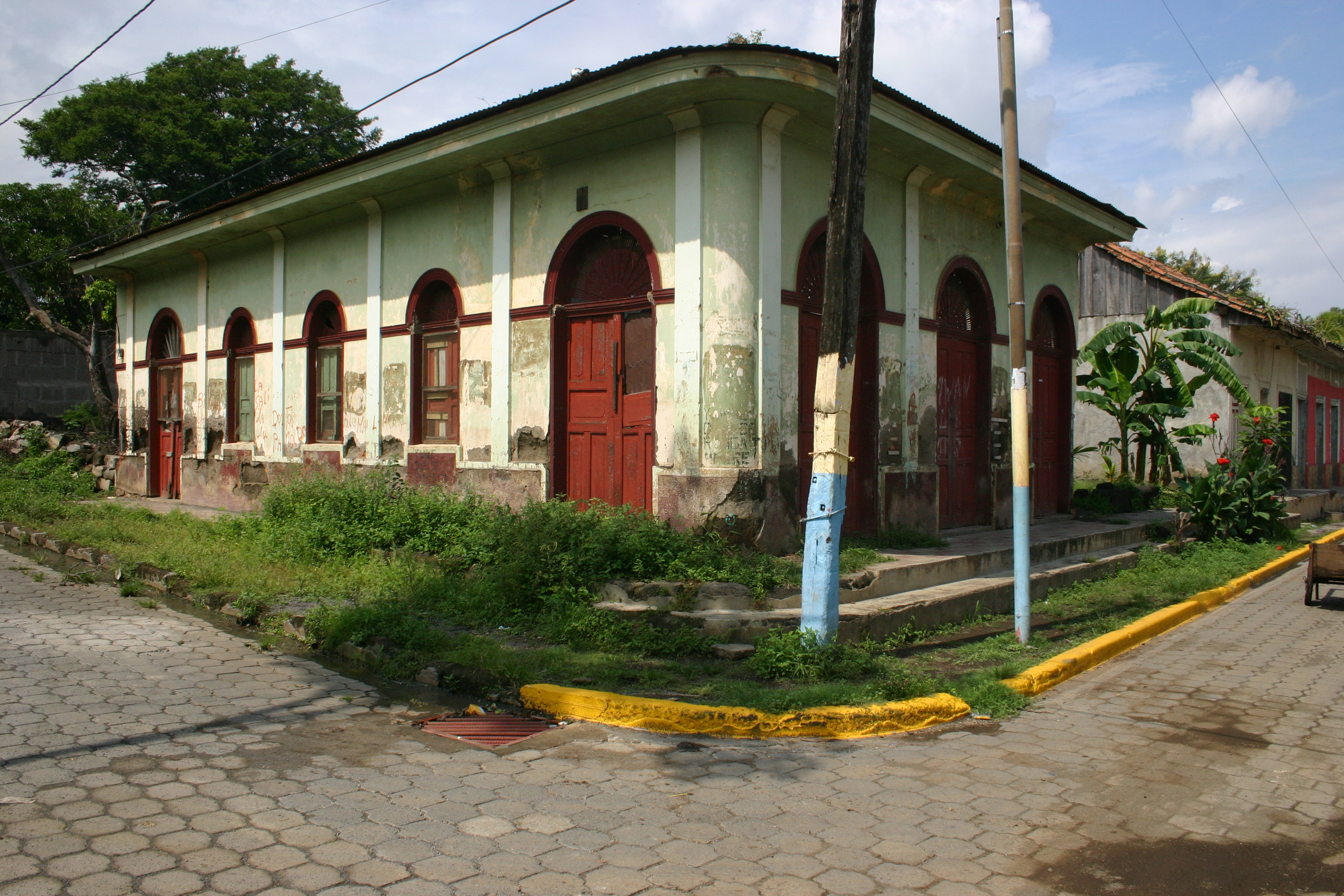
- A colonial house in Tipitapa

- Seal

- Location in Nicaragua
- Coordinates: 12°12′N 86°06′W
- Country: Nicaragua
- Department: Managua
- Founded: 1755

Area
  - Municipality: 975 km^{2} (376 sq mi)

Population (2022 estimate)
  - Municipality: 159,303
  - Density: 163/km^{2} (423/sq mi)
  - Urban: 147,379

Tipitapa is a city and municipality in the Managua department of western Nicaragua. The area is located between Lake Managua and Lake Nicaragua.

== History ==
Tipitapa began as a settlement of local tribes. The first settlers were the Chorotegas, who populated central Nicaragua and especially the location between two lakes. Over time, the Chorotegas were divided into two rival gangs, the Dirianes and Nagrandanos. The kingdom of Dirianes was the jurisdiction to which it belonged. Pre-Tipitapa had its own social, economic and administrative policy. The largest populations were Managua, Xalteva, Diriomo, Niquinohomo, and Mateare Nindirí. There are two versions of the origin of the name of Tipitapa. The first is said to be of Mexican origin and is formed from the prefix "telpë" meaning "stone" with "petlat" meaning "mat or bedroll" and "pan" which means "place" to form "place of stone backpacks". The second version is that "Tipitapa" is derived from the voices "tpitzin" as "alt" meaning "short or small" with the adverb of place "apan" to mean "in the vicinity of a small river or small stream".

The original settlement was established in an area located to the southwest of the present town, near the river's shad fish and like all Indian villages, the sector had a small population whose economic activity was fishing (in Lake Managua).

The current city, Tipitapa, was founded after the town was transferred from the old seat by the wealthy Spanish landowner Juan Bautista Almendarez in 1775. It took him two years of petitioning to the government of the Kingdom of Guatemala, to be granted authority to move the city. Almendarez built the chapel and the first bridge in Tipitapa. During the colonial period, Tipitapa's indigenous population dwindled to approximately 1,211 people. Its residents migrated to other cities due to the high rate of mortality because of epidemic diseases and the national war.

A very important historical event for the town of Tipitapa and for all of Nicaragua is the battle of San Jacinto at a ranch of that name north of the town. It was fought on September 14, 1856 by 120 Nicaraguans trying to defeat more than 300 US adventurers called "filibusteros" under the command of William Walker, who had usurped the presidency of Nicaragua. The Nicaraguans were led by Colonel Jose Dolores Estrada, a national hero, who led his patriots to victory. The date is now a national holiday called "Catorce de Septiembre" (September 14) or "San Jacinto".

Another important historical event for Tipitapa was the Black Thorn Treaty. The treaty was signed on May 4, 1927, by Liberal and Conservative factions who were warring (1926-1927) for political power in the country. The US government sent Henry L. Stimson to negotiate for the peace treaty. In 1929, the city's name was changed to "Villa Stimson" in his honor. It is not clear why the old Indian name "Tipitapa" was abolished, and it was not until 1961 that the name was changed back to "Tipitapa" by legislative decree.

== Geography ==
Tipitapa has a total area of 975.17 km^{2} (376.5 sq mi).

=== Territorial division ===
Tipitapa Township is divided into urban and rural sectors. The urban sector is divided into eight districts, five districts on the periphery, and seven settlements:

Urban Neighborhoods Sector

- Noel Morales
- Francisco Rojas
- Orontes Centeno
- Yuri Ordoñez
- Roberto Vargas Batres
- Ruben Ulloa
- Villa Victoria de Julio
- Juan Castro
- A. Cesar Sandino

Barrios on the urban periphery

- Camilo Ortega St. Martin Citadel
- San Luis Zambrano
- San Juan de la Plywood.

Urban settlements

- Gaspar Garcia Laviana or Tangará
- Aleyda Delgado
- The Trejos
- Peter J. Chamorro No. 2
- Antonio Mendoza
- A Decent Housing P / Master
- The Chaparral.
- Loma de Esquipulas

=== Hydrography ===
Tipitapa Township is in the "Lakes Basin" which extends from the Gulf of Fonseca to the mouth of Rio San Juan. The hydrographic system of the municipality is bounded mainly by the eastern shores of Lake Managua and the Tipitapa River which is an elongated estuary 35 miles (56 km) long and joins Lake Managua to Lake Nicaragua. Lake Managua is about 30 feet (9 m) higher than Lake Nicaragua, so when the lake level is high, the waters run into the Tipitapa River, causing floods that affect certain urban areas of the city.

On the north shore of Lake Managua, leads the Rio San Antonio, of relatively short length because of its origin near the Estrada Plateau. On the southern shore of the lake, there are no tributaries because the volcanic soil is very porous, which favors the infiltration of water.

Another major river is the Malacatoya, which runs through the town on the eastern side and flows into Lake Nicaragua and has a length of 106 km (66 mi) and an annual flow of 1.06 billion cubic metres per second (37.4×10^{9} cu ft/s).

=== Types of soil ===
The soils are classified into five types, depending on location:

- Stony ground and surface: Flags are located in the northeastern part of the municipality of Tipitapa and includes the communities of Terrero, Olominapa, strawberry, La Pita and part of the communities the flags, the Nancital, La Ceiba, La Pie, El Tule, cherimoya, El Caracol and the Crown. In this area are common Montaño-Volcanic landscapes as mountainous, volcanic plains and volcanic hills inter mountain, in a relief ranging from slightly undulating to very steep, with elevations ranging between 100 and 600 metres (330 and 1,970 ft) above sea level.
- River plain volcanic: This ecosystem includes the communities located in the northeast of the town among which are Chilamatillo, Malacatoya, San Benito, The Woods, The Flags, Las Canoas Brazil and COLAM. Elevations range from 50 to 100 metres (160 to 330 ft) above mean sea level, in an area of subtropical dry forest life. Comprises soils developed from basaltic tuff-like geological group "The Sierras", they are in the highest position of the relief, with natural drainage usually drained to Lake Managua. These soils historically in the decade of the 1960s and 1970s were used for cotton, sorghum and later during the 1980s, sugar cane, specifically in what was the mill Victoria de Julio. The current use of these soils are annual crops such as sorghum, maize, rice, although the latter only in very small quantities for personal consumption. Also, some areas have grass with trees, weeds and grasses with fewer managed pastures.
- Vertisols: Plain comprises sedimentary soils are located in the northeastern part of the Plain of Tipitapa, including in part the communities of San Jacinto, Malacatoya, San Benito, The Woods, Flags, Las Canoas, COLAM, Tierra Blanca, old sugar mill Victoria de Julio and the communities adjacent to the Pan American Highway, located between San Benito and Tipitapa. This area identifies a subtropical forest life, with natural vegetation, dominated by extensive grazing systems and agriculture. These soils have developed from alluvial deposits, are susceptible to flooding in rainy season due to its flat topography, have clay texture, with 60% or more clay, so they have high water retention, this leads to cracking in dry periods up to 20 centimetres (8 in) and inflate in the rainy season. These conditions damage the root systems of plants and pose a danger to livestock. The soils are used for flood rice, grass and scrub forest, although the activity of mining has become very difficult because they are extremely hard in summer and in winter too sticky.
- Lands most recent volcanic plain: These soils are located in the southern part of town, containing the town of Tipitapa, the communities Zambrano, El Zapotal, The Burned and communities on the old road Managua - Tipitapa. Formed from recent volcanic materials deposited on ancient sedimentary soils with natural drains usually drain to Lake Managua. The slopes are low, not exceed 10% in one area of life Humeado Sub Tropical Climate Forest, with natural vegetation dominated intensive farming systems. In previous years these lands have been used for intensive farming of cotton and sorghum, without appropriate conservation practices, so that currently have high levels of both wind and water erosion. This area supports the largest urban pressure Tipitapa Township which adds to its proximity to the cities of Managua and Masaya.
- Coast of Lake Managua: This ecosystem is made up of lands located on the coastline of Lake Managua. The main uses of these soils are extensive grazing and cultivation of vegetables in summer, for which the land is very fertile, because during the winter season these lands remain flooded accumulating large amount of moisture. These soils are completely flooded during the rainy season, because they are poorly drained soils with high salinity levels. This problem is compounded by the loss of forest cover along rivers and Lake Managua, pollution of surface and groundwater by the use of pesticides and insecticides and problems related to land tenure.

=== Vegetation ===
The vegetation varies by area. In the north, the vegetation is essentially low scrub. The potential land use is for livestock, and plants are mostly grasses grown to protect soils and trees for energy purposes. The vegetation in central and north-east is cash-crops. The soil is suitable for growing sugar cane, sesame, sorghum and cattle tech. The southern area retains most of the vegetation of the town. It is dominated by evergreen trees and shrubs. Soils are also suitable for the cultivation of maize, cassava, sorghum, sesame and livestock, crops and musa.

Tipitapa Township falls within the area called "semi-arid scrub forest" and "Semi tropical forest savanna." The Semi Sabana forest type is characterized by the contrast between the period of seasonal rain and drought between the months of May and November. The scrub forest, characteristic of the plains and dry places, is made up of highly branched shrubs, twisted, small leaves and sometimes transformed into spines (deciduous trees).

=== Climate ===
Tipitapa has a tropical savanna climate (Köppen: Aw).

Climate data for Tipitapa
Month	Jan	Feb	Mar	Apr	May	Jun	Jul	Aug	Sep	Oct	Nov	Dec	Year
Mean daily maximum °C (°F)	32.5 (90.5)	33.2 (91.8)	34.4 (93.9)	35.6 (96.1)	34.3 (93.7)	32.2 (90.0)	32.6 (90.7)	33.1 (91.6)	32.4 (90.3)	31.5 (88.7)	31.8 (89.2)	32.4 (90.3)	33.0 (91.4)
Daily mean °C (°F)	27.2 (81.0)	27.7 (81.9)	28.7 (83.7)	29.8 (85.6)	29.2 (84.6)	27.8 (82.0)	28.1 (82.6)	28.2 (82.8)	27.6 (81.7)	27.1 (80.8)	27.2 (81.0)	27.4 (81.3)	28.0 (82.4)
Mean daily minimum °C (°F)	22.9 (73.2)	23.0 (73.4)	23.6 (74.5)	24.8 (76.6)	25.2 (77.4)	24.7 (76.5)	24.7 (76.5)	24.6 (76.3)	24.2 (75.6)	24.0 (75.2)	23.6 (74.5)	23.4 (74.1)	24.1 (75.3)
Average precipitation mm (inches)	1.4 (0.06)	1.2 (0.05)	2.4 (0.09)	14.5 (0.57)	148.3 (5.84)	168.9 (6.65)	77.5 (3.05)	115.4 (4.54)	174.9 (6.89)	214.8 (8.46)	68.0 (2.68)	9.4 (0.37)	996.7 (39.25)
Mean monthly sunshine hours	284.2	269.7	299.7	287.3	267.0	248.0	273.4	267.6	239.2	229.0	241.2	269.2	3,175.5
Source: Weather.Directory

== Demographics ==
Tipitapa has a current population of 156,523. Of the total population, 50% is female and 50% is male. 94% of the population lives in the urban section.

== Tradition and culture ==
The town celebrates a festival in honor of the patron saint "Cristo de Esquipulas, or the Black Christ, from 6 to 30 January each year. These festivities are held in the old parish church of the town and last for several days, attracting locals as well as pilgrims that do not live there.

The town is famous for having in its jurisdiction the historic ranch called Hacienda de San Jacinto, the place where the famous battle of September 14, 1856 was fought. Nicaraguan military forces commanded by Colonel José Dolores Estrada fought U.S. adventurers called Filibusteros under William Walker (see Wikipedia article) there. Colonel Estrada is classified as a national hero for having led the Nicaraguan forces.

Thousands of Nicaraguans visit the house and corrals of the ranch San Jacinto National Monument in celebration of the victory on its anniversary, September 14 or "Catorce de Septiembre" in Spanish. There is a monument to Sergeant Andres Castro at the entrance to the farm. He "fell with a stone a member of the opposing army (of US Filibusteros under Walker) which sought to jump over the corral of the hacienda," in a patriotic act celebrated by Nicaragua.

== Economy ==
During the 1970s and 1980s. the town was noted for having a strong livestock industry, due to the abundance of water and pasture. The early 1990s, saw a decline in production levels due to land use jurisdiction. The most important crops today are melon, corn, sorghum, and peanut, for export.

Of the 5,000 head of cattle, most are for meat production.

Non-metallic quarry mining of tuff (stone quarry), occurs north of town on the Flags and the guanaco. In addition, stone bolon is taken from the banks of rivers and lake sand, for construction, is taken along the shores of Lake Managua.

The industrial fabric is poor and is mostly of medium size. The most prominent are woodworking, mills, bakeries, stations, blacksmiths, tailors, agricultural inputs, and mechanical workshops in general.

The main tertiary activity is trade, which has grown from its strategic position between Managua and the departments of the country, especially with Matagalpa, Chontales, and the two Caribbean coast regions of RAAN and RAAS.

The township transportation collective serves six routes with an average of 50, these parts of the county seat every five minutes. The routes connect the town with Managua, León, Chinandega, Carazo, Masaya, Rivas, and Granada. The county seat has a bus terminal.

It also has a branch of the Nicaraguan Telecommunications Company (ENITEL), which provides postal, telegraph, messenger, mail service and international calls. The public telephone service has 150 subscribers scattered throughout the urban sector.

There is a women's prison in Tipitapa, commonly known as "La Esperanza". Christian Solidarity Worldwide has raised concerns over alleged breaches of the international Nelson Mandela Rules in the prison.

== Sports ==
Tipitapa has a total of 11 green areas and 5 baseball fields in the urban area. In rural areas, there are playgrounds or green areas in each of the communities.

The city has many teams in major sports leagues in basketball, softball, baseball, kickball, and soccer. Association football (soccer) is very popular with the local youth throughout the city. The team is in the Second Division of the national soccer league. The local club was formed specifically with players originating from Tipitapa.
