= Salve a ti, Nicaragua =

National anthem of Nicaragua

English: Hail to thee, Nicaragua
- National anthem of Nicaragua
- Also known as: Himno Nacional de Nicaragua (English: National anthem of Nicaragua)
- Lyrics: Salomón Ibarra Mayorga
- Music: Ernesto o Anselmo Castinove (arranged by Luis A. Delgadillo, 1918)
- Adopted: October 20, 1939; 86 years ago
- Readopted: August 25, 1971; 54 years ago
- Preceded by: "Hermosa Soberana"

Audio sample
- U.S. Navy Band instrumental version: file; help

"Salve a ti, Nicaragua" ("Hail to thee, Nicaragua") is the national anthem of Nicaragua. It was approved October 20, 1939, and officially adopted August 25, 1971. The lyrics were written by Salomón Ibarra Mayorga, and it was composed by Ernesto o Anselmo Castinove, with arrangement by Luis A. Delgadillo. Vocally, its key signature is an E major.

== History ==
The music dates back to the 18th century, when it was used as a liturgical anthem by a Spanish monk, Fr. Ernesto o Anselmo Castinove, when the country was a province of Spain. During the initial years of independence, it was used to salute the justices of the Supreme Court of the State of Nicaragua, then a member of the Central American Federation.

The anthem was eventually replaced by three other anthems during periods of political upheaval or revolution, but it was restored on April 23, 1918 at the fall of the last liberal revolution. A contest was opened to the public, for new lyrics for the national anthem. The lyrics could only mention peace and work, as the country had just ended a civil war. As a result, the Nicaraguan state anthem is one of the only state anthems in Latin America that speaks of peace instead of war.

The new conservative, pro-Spanish government quickly awarded the first prize to Salomon Ibarra Mayorga, a Nicaraguan teacher and poet. It replaced the more warlike "Hermosa Soberana" (Beautiful and Sovereign), an anti-Spanish military march that was seen as an embarrassment in a country with deep Spanish roots. "Hermosa Soberana" was, however, adopted by the Liberal Party (Spanish: Partido Liberal) as its partisan anthem from 1927 to this day.

== Lyrics ==
Spanish original

Salve a ti, Nicaragua! En tu suelo,
ya no ruge la voz del cañón,
𝄆 ni se tiñe con sangre de hermanos
tu glorioso pendón bicolor. 𝄇

Brille hermosa la paz en tu cielo,
nada empañe tu gloria inmortal,
¡Qué el trabajo es tu digno laurel!
¡Y el honor es tu enseña triunfal!
¡Es tu enseña triunfal!

Miskito Lyrics

Pri takram, Nicarawa tasbaikamra
Kli simra bimka walramsa
𝄆 Muini nani talia sin kli lairas
Plakikan mapla wal prana kira 𝄇

Yamnikira in wisa tasbrikara
prilakara manrara yakira sirpiapia
woratanka kraunka yamni sa
Manyurara, malkanka pura yura kan sa
malkanka pura yura kan sa

English translation

Hail to thee, Nicaragua! On thy land
roareth the voice of the cannon no more,
𝄆 nor doeth the blood of brothers now stain
thy glorious bicolor banner. 𝄇

Let peace shine beautifully in thy sky,
and nothing dimmeth thine immortal glory,
for labor is thy well-earned laurel
and honor is thy triumphal emblem,
is thy triumphal emblem!
