= Hermosa Soberana =

National anthem

English: Beautiful and Sovereign
- Former national anthem of Nicaragua
- Music: Alejandro Cousin
- Adopted: 1893
- Relinquished: 1910
- Preceded by: "Marcha Roberto Sacasa"
- Succeeded by: "Salve a ti, Nicaragua"

"Hermosa Soberana" (English: "Beautiful [and] Sovereign", lit. '"Sovereign Beautiful"') was the national anthem of Nicaragua from 1893 until 1910.

The anthem was dedicated to General José Santos Zelaya, and was adopted as the national anthem in September 1893. The music was composed by Alejandro Cousin (father-in-law of General Zelaya), who also composed the 1889–1893 national anthem. The author is not exactly known, but it was probably written by one of three poets: Rubén Darío, Santiago Argüello or Manuel Maldonado. Although replaced in 1910, "Hermosa Soberana" is still popular as a patriotic song. "Hermosa Soberana" is still the partisan anthem of the Liberal Party (Spanish: Partido Liberal) which governed Nicaragua from 1927 to 1979 and from 1997 to 2006.

After the failure of last liberal revolution in 1910, it was replaced by a more peaceful-like "Salve a ti, Nicaragua" in accordance with the peace spirit of a country that had just ended a series of civil wars.

== Lyrics ==
Spanish lyrics

𝄆 Hermosa Soberana,
cual Sultana;
Nicaragua, de sus lagos
al rumor. ¡Al rumor!
Ve a sus hijos denodados,
los Soldados del honor. 𝄇

¡Siempre libre! ¡Y hechicera!
¡Siempre libre y hechicera!
Su bandera, su bandera
ve flotar.

Y apacible se reclina,
cual ondina de la mar.
¡Siempre libre! ¡Y hechicera!
¡Siempre libre y hechicera!
Su bandera, su bandera
ve flotar.

Y orgullosa cual deidad, cual deidad,
¡Muestra altiva el noble pecho!
En defensa del derecho,
¡Y su Santa Libertad!

English translation

𝄆 Beautiful Sovereign
As a Queen,
Nicaragua, from her lakes
Hear the murmur, hear the murmur,
See her indefatigable children
The soldiers of honour 𝄇

Forever free and inspired
Forever free and inspired
Her banner, her banner
See it waving.

And calmly she rises
As a gentle wave on the sea.
Forever free and inspired
Forever free and inspired
Her banner, her banner
See it waving.

And proud as a deity, as a deity,
She rises her chest
In defence of her right
And her holy liberty.
