= Lake Managua =

Lake in Nicaragua

- Lago de Managua (Spanish); Lago Xolotlán (Spanish)
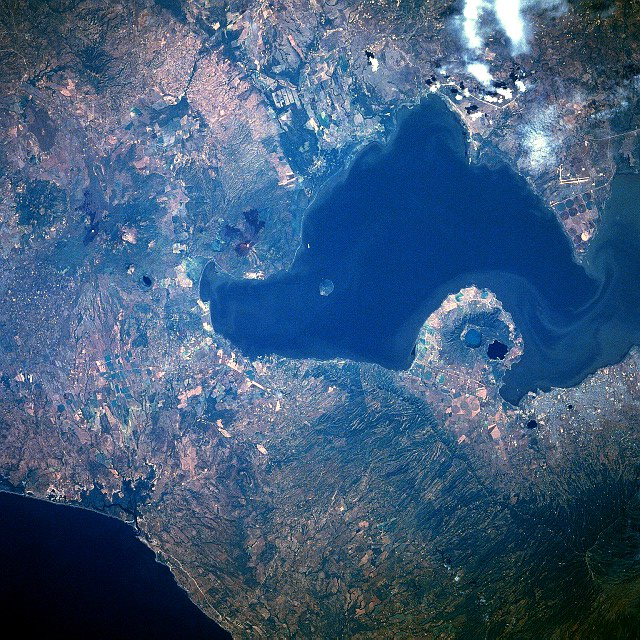
- 1986 (north is to the left)

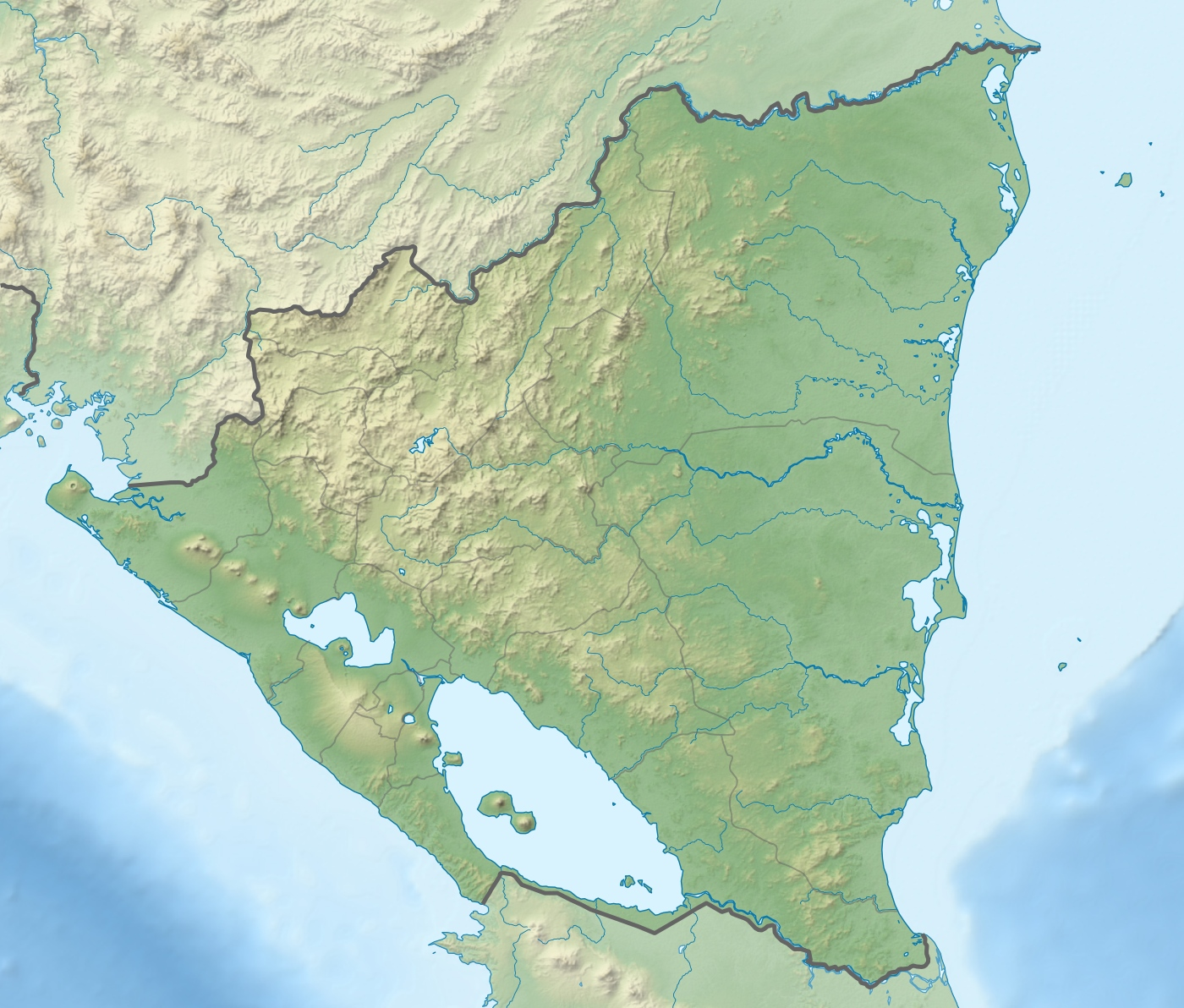
- Location within Nicaragua
- Coordinates: 12°20′N 86°25′W
- Primary outflows: Tipitapa River
- Basin countries: Nicaragua
- Max. length: 65 km (40 mi)
- Max. width: 25 km (16 mi)
- Surface area: 1,024 km^{2} (395 sq mi)
- Average depth: 9.5 m (31 ft)
- Max. depth: 20 m (66 ft)
- Surface elevation: 39 m (128 ft)
- Islands: Momotombito
- Settlements: Managua

Lake Managua (Spanish: Lago de Managua, [maˈnaɣwa]), also known as Lake Xolotlán (Lago Xolotlán), is a freshwater lake in Nicaragua. At 1,042 km², it is approximately 65 kilometres (40 mi) long and 25 kilometres (16 mi) wide. Similarly to the name of Lake Nicaragua, its other name comes from the Nahuatl language, possibly from the Spanish Tlaxcaltec and Mexica allies but most likely from the Nicarao tribes that had already settled in the region. The city of Managua, the capital of Nicaragua, lies on its southwestern shore.

== Islands ==
There are two uninhabited lake islands:

- Momotombito, a volcanic island. There is another nearby volcano, on the mainland: Momotombo.
- Isla Rosa, an islet

== Flooding ==
The level of Lake Managua rises significantly during periods of heavy rain. The highest water level was recorded during the flooding of 1933.

The lake rose 3 metres (10 ft) in five days during Hurricane Mitch in 1998, destroying the homes of many who lived on its edge. An even higher flooding occurred in September/October 2010. Since then, the city has prohibited residential use of the most flood-prone areas, those with the elevation below 42.76 meters above sea level.

== Pollution ==
Lake Managua was described by some authors as "the most contaminated lake in Central America",, especially since 1927 when it became the dumping point for Managua's raw sewage In 2009, a modern wastewater treatment plant was built and operated by the British company Biwater), but it treats only 40% of the city's wastewater.

The lake today has no stable outlet, with only occasional seasonal floods to Lake Nicaragua through the Tipitapa River, thus concentrating the pollutants. Despite the situation, many people still live along the lake's shores and eat the fish from it.

In 2007 the malecón area was dredged, and the sediment hauled off on barges. A strong odor which permeated the area disappeared. A stone rip-rap and concrete wharf was constructed, and a sightseeing boat called La Novia de Xolotlán makes hour-long lake tours when there are sufficient tourists.

== Wildlife ==
About 20 fish species still survive in Lake Managua.

While joined to Lake Nicaragua, the bull sharks of that lake cannot migrate to Lake Managua due to a 12-foot-high (3.7 m) waterfall on the Tipitapa River.

== Gallery ==
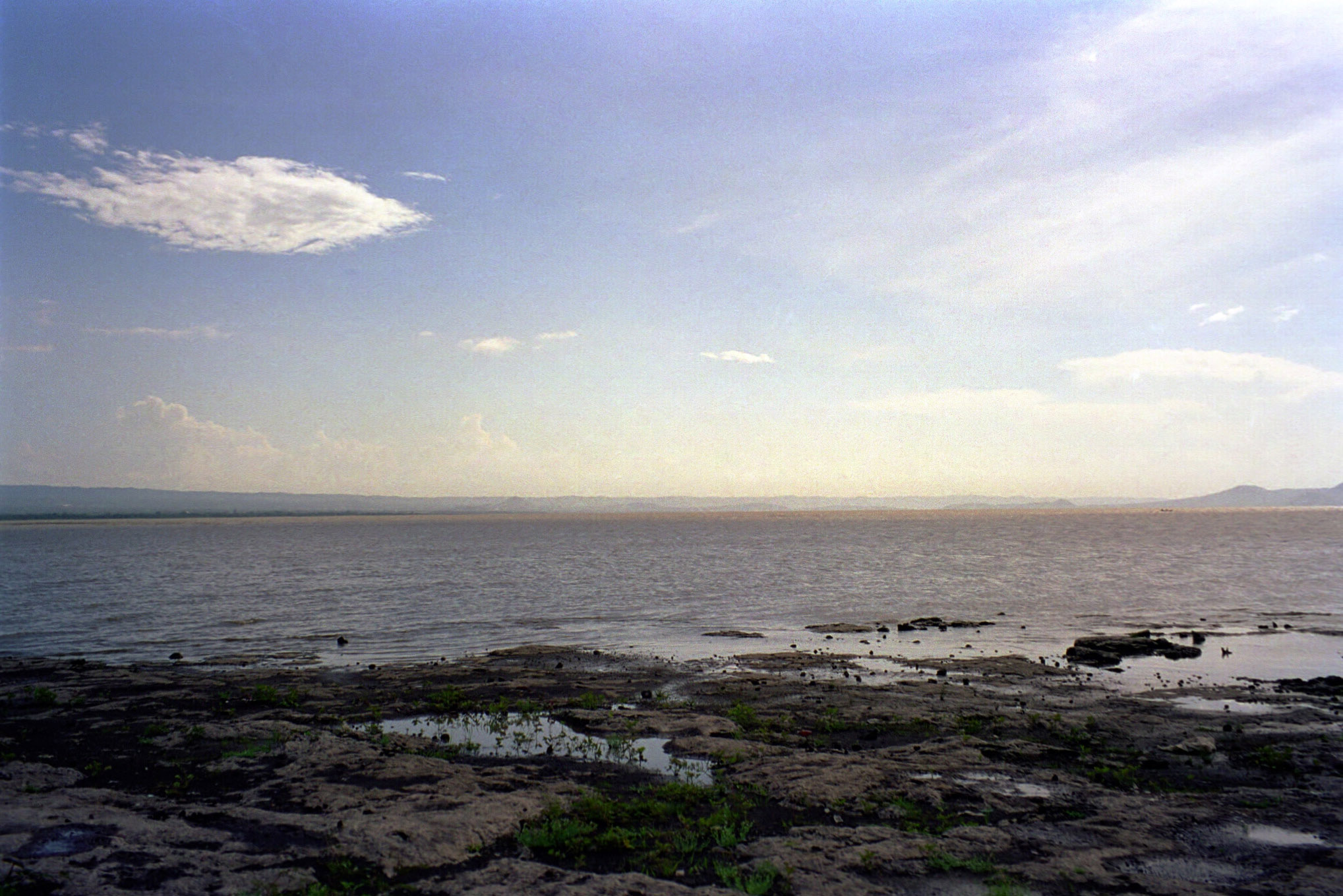
Lake view from Tipitapa (2003)

View from Tipitapa (2003). Momotombo and Momotombito Volcanoes in the background

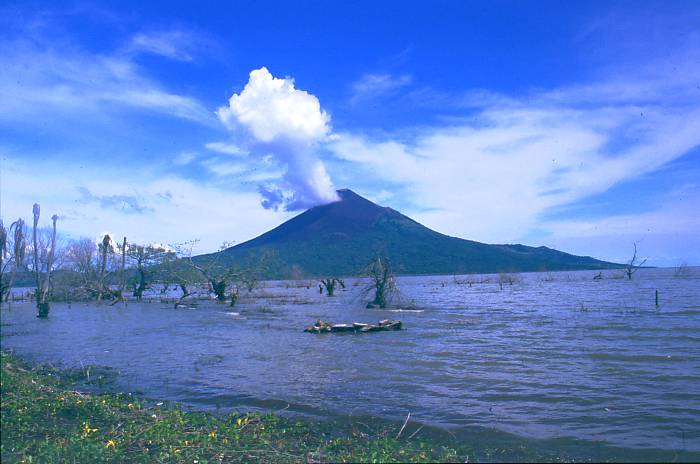
Momotombo Volcano on the lakeshore
