= List of heads of state of Nicaragua =

The Head of State of Nicaragua is the person who controls the executive power in the Republic of Nicaragua. From 1825 to 1838, the executive was the governor of Nicaragua as part of the Federal Republic of Central America. In 1838, Nicaragua became a separate nation and, under the Constitution of 1839, the office of Supreme Director (Director Supremo) was created, amended in 1854 to the title of President of Nicaragua. In 2025 the Constitution of Nicaragua was amended to allow the powers of the presidency to be exercised by two co-presidents rather than a single person.

== Heads of the state of Nicaragua within the Federal Republic of Central America (1822–1838) ==
Name	Political party	Dates in office	Notes
Manuel Antonio de la Cerda	Conservative Federalist	22 April 1825 – 22 April 1826	1st time, from León.
Juan Argüello	Liberal Federalist	22 April 1826 – 14 September 1827	1st time, from León.
Pedro Benito Pineda	Conservative Federalist	17 September 1826 – 26 February 1827	In rebellion, from Granada.
Manuel Antonio de la Cerda	Conservative Federalist	27 February 1827 – 7 November 1828	In rebellion, 2nd time.
Pedro Oviedo	Liberal Federalist	14 September 1827 – December 1827	Provisional, from Chinandega, León and Granada.
Liberal Juntas	Liberal Federalist	December 1827 – August 1828	From León and Granada.
Juan Argüello	Liberal Federalist	5 August 1828 – November 1829	2nd time, from León.
Juan Espinosa	Liberal Federalist	8 November 1829 – 10 May 1830	Acting.
Dionisio de Herrera	Liberal Federalist	10 May 1830 – December 1833	
Benito Morales	Legitimist	December 1833 – 10 March 1834	Acting.
José Núñez	Legitimist	10 March 1834 – 23 April 1835	
José Zepeda	Liberal Federalist	23 April 1835 – 25 January 1837	Assassinated.
José Núñez	Legitimist	25 January 1837 – 12 January 1838	2nd time, acting.
Francisco Jiménez Rubio	Legitimist	12 January 1838 – 13 March 1838	Acting.
José Núñez	Legitimist	13 March 1838 – 30 April 1838	3rd time.

== Supreme directors (1838–1854) ==
Portrait	Name	Political party	Dates in office	Notes
	José Núñez	Legitimist	30 April 1838 – 5 January 1839	First Transitional Government
	Joaquín del Cossío	Legitimist	? 1839 – 15 May 1839	Second Transitional Government
	Evaristo Rocha	Legitimist	5 January – 30 June 1839	Second Transitional Government, Acting
	Patricio Rivas	Democratic	30 June 1839 – 27 July 1839	Second Transitional Government, Acting
	Joaquín del Cossío	Legitimist	27 July 1839 – 20 October 1839	Second Transitional Government
	Hilario Ulloa	Legitimist	20 October 1839 – 7 November 1839	Acting
	Tomás Valladares	Democratic	7 November 1839 – 21 September 1840	Acting
	Patricio Rivas	Democratic	21 September 1840 – 4 March 1841	Acting
	Pablo Buitrago	Legitimist	4 March 1841 – 1 April 1843	1841 Nicaraguan supreme director elections
	Juan de Dios Orozco	Legitimist	1 April 1843 – 31 May 1843	Acting
	Manuel Pérez	Democratic	31 May 1843 – 4 November 1844	Elected by Parliament, resigned due to Salvadoran Invasion
	Emiliano Madriz	Democratic	4 November 1844 – 24 January 1845	Acting until 26 December, then Interim in León
	Silvestre Selva	Legitimist	16 December 1844 – 20 January 1845	Appointed by invading forces of Francisco Malespín, in Masaya
	Blas Antonio Sáenz	Legitimist	20 January – 4 April 1845	Provisional in Masaya until 24 January, Acting until elections
	José León Sandoval	Republican	4 April 1845 – 12 March 1847	1845 Nicaraguan Supreme Director Elections
	Miguel Ramón Morales	Legitimist	12 March – 6 April 1847	Acting
	José María Guerrero	Republican	6 April 1847 – 1 January 1849	Lost the 1847 Nicaraguan Supreme Director Elections, but Legislative Assembly appointed him unanimously
	Toribio Terán	Legitimist	1 January – 8 March 1849	Acting
	Benito Rosales	Legitimist	8 March – 1 April 1849	Acting
	Norberto Ramírez	Legitimist	1 April 1849 – 1 April 1851	1849 Nicaraguan Supreme Director Elections
	Justo Abaunza	Legitimist	1 April – 5 May 1851	Provisional Government in León. 1st time, Acting Senator.
	Laureano Pineda	Democratic	5 May – 4 August 1851	1st time. Deposed by José Trinidad Muñoz's military coup.
	Justo Abaunza	Legitimist	4 August – 11 November 1851	2nd time. Acting senator under the authority of José Trinidad Muñoz, General in Chief, leader of the military coup.
	Laureano Pineda	Democratic	5–11 August 1851	In dissent, 2nd time.
	José Francisco del Montenegro	Legitimist	5–11 August 1851	Government in Granada, died after assuming command.
	José de Jesús Alfaro	Democratic	11 August – 2 November 1851	In dissent. Government in Granada, Acting Senator.
	Fulgencio Vega	Legitimist	11 November 1851 – 1852,	Appointed by the Assembly with the support of: Fruto Chamorro Brigadier General, victorious against José Trinidad Muñoz.
	Laureano Pineda	Democratic	11 November 1851 – 1 April 1853	In rebellion until 2 November 1851. 3rd time.
	Fruto Chamorro	Legitimist	1 April 1853 – 30 April 1854	Government in Granada.
	Francisco Castellón	Democratic	11 June 1854 – 2 September 1855	Provisional in rebellion, from León to 1 April 1855.
	Nazario Escoto	Democratic	2 September – 30 October 1855	Provisional in rebellion, from León.

== Presidents of the Republic of Nicaragua (1854–2025) ==
No.	Portrait	Name (Birth–Death)	Term of office			Political party (at time of election)	Election	Ref.
No.	Portrait	Name (Birth–Death)	Took office	Left office	Time in office	Political party (at time of election)	Election	Ref.
1	Fruto Chamorro	Fruto Chamorro (1804–1855)	30 April 1854	12 March 1855	316 days	Conservative	–	
—	José María Estrada	José María Estrada (1802–1856); Acting	12 March 1855	22 October 1855	224 days	Conservative	–	
—	Patricio Rivas	Patricio Rivas (1810–1867); Provisional	30 October 1855	24 June 1857	224 days	Democratic	1856	
—	William Walker	William Walker (1824–1860); Usurper	12 July 1856	1 May 1857	293 days	Democratic	–	
—	Máximo Jerez and Tomás Martínez	Government Junta; Máximo Jerez and Tomás Martínez	24 June 1857	15 November 1857	144 days	Non partisan	–	
2	Tomás Martínez	Tomás Martínez (1820–1873)	15 November 1857	1 March 1867	9 years, 106 days	Conservative	1857; 1863	
3	Fernando Guzmán Solórzano	Fernando Guzmán Solórzano (1812–1891)	1 March 1867	1 March 1871	4 years	Conservative	1867	
4	José Vicente Cuadra	José Vicente Cuadra (1812–1894)	1 March 1871	1 March 1875	4 years	Conservative	1871	
5	Pedro Joaquín Chamorro Alfaro	Pedro Joaquín Chamorro Alfaro (1818–1890)	1 March 1875	1 March 1879	4 years	Conservative	1875	
6	Joaquín Zavala	Joaquín Zavala (1835–1906)	1 March 1879	1 March 1883	4 years	Conservative	1879	
7	Adán Cárdenas	Adán Cárdenas (1836–1916)	1 March 1883	1 March 1887	4 years	Conservative	1883	
8	Evaristo Carazo	Evaristo Carazo (1821–1889)	1 March 1887	1 August 1889	2 years, 153 days	Conservative	1887	
–	Nicolás Osorno	Nicolás Osorno (1845–1918); Acting	1 August 1889	5 August 1889	4 days	Conservative	–	–
–	Roberto Sacasa	Roberto Sacasa (1840–1896); Acting	5 August 1889	1 January 1891	1 year, 149 days	Conservative	–	
9	Ignacio Chaves Tellería	Ignacio Chaves Tellería (1836–1925)	1 January 1891	1 March 1891	59 days	Conservative	–	–
10	Roberto Sacasa	Roberto Sacasa (1840–1896)	1 March 1891	11 July 1893	2 years, 132 days	Conservative	–	
–	Salvador Machado	Salvador Machado (1838–1925); Acting	11 July 1893	15 July 1893	4 days	Conservative	–	–
–	Joaquín Zavala	Joaquín Zavala (1835–1906); Acting	16 July 1893	25 July 1893	9 days	Conservative	–	
11	José Santos Zelaya	José Santos Zelaya (1853–1919)	25 July 1893	21 December 1909	16 years, 149 days	Liberal	1902; 1906	
–	José Madriz	José Madriz (1867–1911); Acting	21 December 1909	20 August 1910	242 days	Liberal	–	
–	José Dolores Estrada	José Dolores Estrada (1869–1939); Acting	20 August 1910	27 August 1910	7 days	Liberal	–	–
–	Luis Mena	Luis Mena (1865–1928); Acting	27 August 1910	30 August 1910	3 days	Conservative	–	–
–	Juan José Estrada	Juan José Estrada (1872–1947); Acting	30 August 1910	9 May 1911	252 days	Liberal	–	
12	Adolfo Díaz	Adolfo Díaz (1875–1964)	9 May 1911	1 January 1917	5 years, 237 days	Conservative	1912; 1914	
13	Emiliano Chamorro Vargas	Emiliano Chamorro Vargas (1871–1966)	1 January 1917	1 January 1921	4 years	Conservative	1916	
14	Diego Manuel Chamorro	Diego Manuel Chamorro (1861–1923)	1 January 1921	12 October 1923 †	2 years, 284 days	Conservative	1920	
–	Rosendo Chamorro	Rosendo Chamorro (1862–1947); Acting	12 October 1923	27 October 1923	15 days	Conservative	–	–
15	Bartolomé Martínez	Bartolomé Martínez (1873–1936)	27 October 1923	1 January 1925	1 year, 66 days	Conservative	–	
16	Carlos José Solórzano	Carlos José Solórzano (1860–1936)	1 January 1925	14 March 1926	1 year, 72 days	Conservative	1924	
(13)	Emiliano Chamorro Vargas	Emiliano Chamorro Vargas (1871–1966); De facto	14 March 1926	11 November 1926	242 days	Conservative	–	
–	Sebastián Uriza	Sebastián Uriza (1861–?); Acting	11 November 1926	14 November 1926	3 days	Conservative	–	–
(12)	Adolfo Díaz	Adolfo Díaz (1875–1964)	14 November 1926	1 January 1929	2 years, 293 days	Conservative	1926	
17	José María Moncada	José María Moncada (1870–1945)	1 January 1929	1 January 1933	4 years	PLN	1928	
18	Juan Bautista Sacasa	Juan Bautista Sacasa (1874–1946)	1 January 1933	9 June 1936	3 years, 160 days	PLN	1932	
–	Carlos Alberto Brenes	Carlos Alberto Brenes (1884–1942); Acting	9 June 1936	1 January 1937	206 days	PLN	–	
19	Anastasio Somoza García	Anastasio Somoza García (1896–1956)	1 January 1937	1 May 1947	10 years, 120 days	PLN	1936	
20	Leonardo Argüello Barreto	Leonardo Argüello Barreto (1875–1947)	1 May 1947	26 May 1947	25 days	PLN	1947 (Feb)	
–	Benjamín Lacayo Sacasa	Benjamín Lacayo Sacasa (1893–1959); Acting	26 May 1947	15 August 1947	81 days	PLN	–	
21	Víctor Manuel Román y Reyes	Víctor Manuel Román y Reyes (1872–1950)	15 August 1947	6 May 1950	25 days	PLN	1947 (Aug)	
–	Manuel Fernando Zurita	Manuel Fernando Zurita (?–?); Acting	6 May 1950	7 May 1950	1 day	PLN	–	–
(19)	Anastasio Somoza García	Anastasio Somoza García (1896–1956)	7 May 1950	29 September 1956 †	6 years, 145 days	PLN	1950	
22	Luis Somoza Debayle	Luis Somoza Debayle (1922–1967)	29 September 1956	1 May 1963	6 years, 214 days	PLN	1957	
23	René Schick	René Schick (1909–1966)	1 May 1963	3 August 1966 †	3 years, 94 days	PLN	1963	
–	Orlando Montenegro Medrano	Orlando Montenegro Medrano (1920–1988); Acting	3 August 1966	4 August 1966	1 day	PLN	–	–
24	Lorenzo Guerrero	Lorenzo Guerrero (1900–1981)	4 August 1966	1 May 1967	271 days	PLN	–	
25	Anastasio Somoza Debayle	Anastasio Somoza Debayle (1925–1980)	1 May 1967	1 May 1972	5 years	PLN	1967	
–	Liberal-Conservative Junta	Liberal-Conservative Junta	1 May 1972	1 December 1974	2 years, 214 days	Non partisan	–	–
(25)	Anastasio Somoza Debayle	Anastasio Somoza Debayle (1925–1980)	1 December 1974	17 July 1979	4 years, 228 days	PLN	1974	
–	Francisco Urcuyo	Francisco Urcuyo (1915–2001); Acting	17 July 1979	18 July 1979	1 day	PLN	–	
–	Junta of National Reconstruction	Junta of National Reconstruction (Coordinator: Daniel Ortega)	18 July 1979	10 January 1985	5 years, 176 days	Non partisan	–	–
26	Daniel Ortega	Daniel Ortega (born 1945)	10 January 1985	25 April 1990	5 years, 105 days	FSLN	1984	
27	Violeta Chamorro	Violeta Chamorro (1929–2025)	25 April 1990	10 January 1997	6 years, 260 days	UNO	1990	
28	Arnoldo Alemán	Arnoldo Alemán (born 1946)	10 January 1997	10 January 2002	5 years	PLC	1996	
29	Enrique Bolaños	Enrique Bolaños (1928–2021)	10 January 2002	10 January 2007	5 years	PLC; APRE	2001	
(26)	Daniel Ortega	Daniel Ortega (born 1945)	10 January 2007	18 February 2025	18 years, 39 days	FSLN	2006; 2011; 2016; 2021	–

== Co-presidents of the Republic of Nicaragua (since 2025) ==
No.	Portrait	Name (Birth–Death)	Term of office			Political party (at time of election)	Election	Ref.
No.	Portrait	Name (Birth–Death)	Took office	Left office	Time in office	Political party (at time of election)	Election	Ref.
(26)	Daniel Ortega	Daniel Ortega (born 1945); Co-president	18 February 2025	Incumbent	1 year, 247 days	FSLN	–	
30	Rosario Murillo	Rosario Murillo (born 1951); Co-president	18 February 2025	Incumbent	1 year, 247 days	FSLN	–	

== See also ==
- History of Nicaragua
- Politics of Nicaragua
- List of years in Nicaragua
