= Fulgencio Vega =

Nicaraguan politician (1805–1868)

Fulgencio de la Vega y Santos
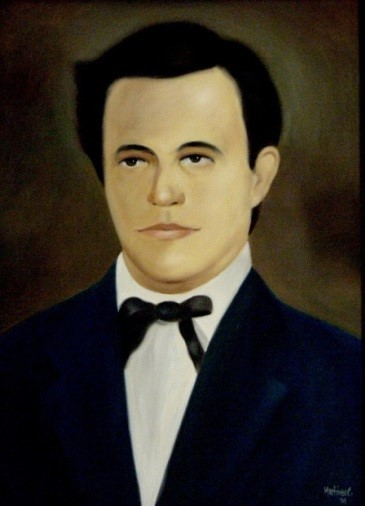

Supreme Director of Nicaragua
- In office 11 November 1851 – 13 February 1852 Serving with Laureano Pineda
- Preceded by: Laureano Pineda
- Succeeded by: Fruto Chamorro

Personal details
- Born: 5 November 1805 Granada, Captaincy General of Guatemala
- Died: 1 August 1868 (aged 62) Granada, Republic of Nicaragua
- Party: Legitimist
- Nickname(s): Borbollón; Tata Vega

Fulgencio de la Vega y Santos (5 November 1805 – 1 August 1868) nicknamed "Tata Vega" was a Conservative Nicaraguan politician that is often credited with moving the Nicaraguan capital to Managua. He served as 9th Supreme Director from November 1851 to 1852. He was preceded by José de Jesús Alfaro and succeeded by José Laureano Pineda Ugarte.

== Background ==
He was born in Granada on 5 November 1805 from the marriage of Deogracias de la Vega y Fajardo with Josefina Santos Argüello. He married Mercedes Vega Chamorro who was his first cousin, daughter of his paternal uncle, Francisco la Vega and Fajardo with Josefa Chamorro, the illustrious hero of 11 November 1811.

=== Early Military Career ===
Vega, a lifelong conservative, supported Brigadier General Fruto Chamorro. He exemplified the stereotype of the typical Creole leader. Vega’s friends called him energetic, cunning, brave, and nicknamed him "Borbollón" because he spoke loudly.

Vega participated in politics young age. When Colonel Cleto Ordóñez launched the first social revolution in Nicaragua, Vega, who was only 19, saw how the Oligarchs were persecuted and snatched and rolled on the ground.

He participated in the first civil war in 1827, as well as the anti-constitutionalist rebellion of 1834 during the government of José Núñez.

== As Supreme Director ==
At dawn on 4 August 1851, General José Trinidad Muñoz carried out a military coup against Laureano Pineda and organized a Provisional Government based in León naming Justo Abaunza Interim Supreme Director.

The Assembly reunited in Managua, replied to the uprising of Muñoz, naming Senator José Francisco del Montenegro Supreme Director in the absence of Pineda, who organized his government in Granada.

With the sudden death of the Montenegro, José de Jesús Alfaro took over temporarily until the Assembly, to fill the vacancy, conferred the High Position on Vega, who, in the exercise of Supreme Command, commuted the death sentence handed down against General Muñoz for the expatriation to El Salvador, made effective in October 1851.

== Flugencio's Caudillismo ==
Vega was a popular caudillo and had a band of fervent followers. It is said that once his followers came to propose the candidacy for Supreme Director of the State, laughing he told them:

"The Supreme Director is a Nicaraguan who serves Nicaraguans without distinction of political color, seeing only the general interests of the Nation. Without hesitation he cuts the bad finger, not allowing incorrect handling even if they are from his own supporters. On the other hand, the caudillo is a man dedicated solely to benefiting his supporters, without seeing any defect in them. The caudillo gives his friends everything, even his pants, and for them he sacrifices himself day and night."

He concluded by asking:

"What do you want? To see Fulgencio Vega as Supreme Director or for him to continue being a caudillo?"

And, mockingly, they said with one voice: "Caudillo!"

He was president of the Nicaraguan Congress from 1852 to 1853.

Political offices
Preceded by Laureano Pineda	Supreme Director of Nicaragua (alongside Pineda); 1851 – 1852	Succeeded by Laureano Pineda (later Chamorro)
