= José Francisco del Montenegro =

Nicaraguan politician

Acting Supreme Director of Nicaragua
- In office August 5, 1851 – August 11, 1851
- Preceded by: Laureano Pineda
- Succeeded by: José de Jesús Alfaro

Minister of Foreign Affairs of Nicaragua
- Incumbent
- Assumed office 1845

Personal details
- Born: 1790
- Died: August 11, 1851 (aged 60–61)
- Party: Legitimist Party

José Francisco del Montenegro (1790 – 11 August 1851) was a Nicaraguan politician who served as Acting Supreme Director of Nicaragua from 5 to 11 August 1851, the same date he died.

As a member of the Legitimist Party, in 1845, he became Minister of Foreign Affairs in José León Sandoval's cabinet.

On 4 August 1851, José Trinidad Muñoz together with Pablo Buitrago y Benavente organized a military coup in the country, as a result of which the head of state Laureano Pineda fled to Honduras. Montenegro was then appointed as Supreme Director based in Granada, but he died shortly after taking office. Pineda, who fled to Honduras, and Justo Abaunza in León also announced themselves as the Supreme Directors. According to Francisco Castellón, the Bishop of San Salvador, Jorge de Viteri y Ungo, was behind these intrigues.

Political offices
Preceded by Laureano Pineda	Supreme Director of Nicaragua; 1851	Succeeded by José de Jesús Alfaro
