= Pablo Buitrago y Benavente =

Nicaraguan politician

Pablo Buitrago
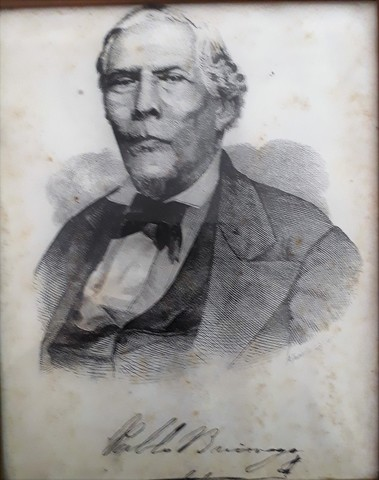

Supreme Director of Nicaragua
- In office 4 March 1841 – 1 April 1843
- Leader: Casto Fonseca
- Preceded by: Patricio Rivas (Acting)
- Succeeded by: Juan de Dios Orozco (Acting)

Personal details
- Born: 25 January 1807 Granada, Spanish Empire
- Died: 22 June 1882 (aged 75) Nueva San Salvador, El Salvador
- Party: Legitimist
- Occupation: Politician

Pablo Sánchez de Buitrago Sandoval y Benavente (25 January 1807 – 22 June 1882) was a legitimist Nicaraguan politician who served as the 2nd Supreme Director of Nicaragua from 4 March 1841 to 1 April 1843. He was the first non-acting, elected Supreme Director.

== Oreamuno-Buitrago Treaty ==
After José Núñez was elected Head of State of Nicaragua on 13 March 1838, Joaquín del Cossío was appointed Deputy Head and Buitrago was appointed Minister General.

On 30 April 1838, Nicaragua became the first State of the Federal Republic of Central America to separate from the union, and on 14 November, Costa Rica also declared independence. Buitrago was sent as a commissioner of Núñez's government to sign the Oreamuno-Buitrago Treaty with Francisco María Oreamuno of Costa Rica, a friendship and alliance agreement between the two newly independent states.

== As Supreme Director ==
=== Election ===
In 1841 the first elections were held, corresponding to the 1838 constitution, and Buitrago was elected by three quarters of the 290 votes. On 4 March of that year two legislatures legislated that he had been constitutionally elected. As a first official act, he replaced Francisco Castellón, who had been employed by Patricio Rivas, in the post of Minister General, with Simon Orozco, whom Buitrago could more easily control.

=== Anti-Liberal ideals and Francisco Morazán ===
Buitrago responded to a message from Francisco Morazán from San Miguel with scorn and when Morazán later became the head of the government in Costa Rica, he wanted to appoint two commissioners to him, which he refused to recognize. This behavior towards the policies of the liberal Morazán was noted with benevolence by the conservative government in Guatemala.

When Morazán became president of Costa Rica in 1842, the then president of El Salvador, Juan José Guzmán, broke off diplomatic relations with Costa Rica and formed the Confederación de Centroamérica, an anti-liberal alliance with the governments of Francisco Ferrera in Honduras and Buitrago in Nicaragua.

The agreements from this alliance were later put forward as justification for the Guerra de Malespín.

== National Representation of Central America ==
Coat of arms of the National Representation of Central America

=== Formation of the Confederation ===
On 8 November 1849, the governments of Nicaragua, El Salvador and Honduras signed the "Pact of the Confederation" in León, an attempt to unite the states once again. The representation of this confederation met on 9 January 1851 in Chinandega. The representatives were Pablo Buitrago y Benavente, Justo Abaunza and Hermenegildo Zepeda Fernández for Nicaragua, José María Guerrero de Arcos for Honduras, José Francisco Barrundia and José María Silva for El Salvador. The board elected Hermenegildo Zepeda Fernández as President, José María Silva as first secretary and Buitrago as second secretary.

=== Battle of La Arada ===
On 26 April 1851 during the armed conflict between Guatemala and the states of Honduras and El Salvador, Buitrago responded to the Foreign Minister of Guatemala, Pedro N. Arriaga, in which the Guatemalan government refused to accept the commissioners to settle the peace between Guatemala and the states. As a result of the communication from the Guatemalan government, the general government of Central America issued a resolution for Guatemala to recognises its commissioners. On the same day, 26 April, he replied to a statement made by the Minister General of El Salvador, Eugenio Aguilar, on 17 April with the government's resolution.

== Later life and death ==
On 4 August 1851 Buitrago and José Trinidad Muñoz organized a military coup against Supreme Director Laureano Pineda. The coup was originally successful in overthrowing Pineda, but on 2 November he returned to Nicaragua with military support from Honduras and he was reappointed Supreme Director. Buitrago then left for El Salvador.

On 26 November 1856, he appeared before the Salvadoran President, Rafael Campo to certify his representation by the Republic of Nicaragua as Minister Plenipotentiary and Extraordinary Envoy.

On 15 March 1882, during the Great Morazán Civic Festival held in El Salvador, Buitrago was one of the special commissioners of the Central American nations, representing Nicaragua. In the newly opened Parque Morazán, he gave a speech in which he "exposed his admiration for the glory of Morazán". This would be considered his last public speech.

He died on 22 June 1882. An article dedicated to Buitrago was published in the Official Gazette of El Salvador on 25 July. He was buried in Santa Tecla (at that time Nueva San Salvador), El Salvador.

Political offices
Preceded by Patricio Rivas (acting)	Supreme Director of Nicaragua; 1841 – 1843	Succeeded by Juan de Dios Orozco (acting)
