= José de Jesús Alfaro =

President of Nicaragua

José de Jesús Alfaro was a legitmist Nicaraguan politician who served as provisional Supreme Director of Nicaragua in Granada after the sudden death of José Francisco del Montenegro from 11 August to 2 November 1851.

On 5 August 1851, José Trinidad Muñoz staged a coup against Laureano Pineda and forced him and his cabinet to leave from León to Honduras. Muñoz appointed José Francisco de Montenegro in Granada, but he died suddenly on 11 August and Alfaro took office. During this period, there were three Supreme Directors, Pineda in dissidence from Honduras, Alfaro in Granada and Justo Abaunza in León.

On 2 November 1851 militia under Fruto Chamorro supported by the returning Pineda from Honduras with help from Juan Lindo began to siege León. Abaunza surrendered followed by Alfaro in Granada handing over power to Fulgencio Vega and Pineda.

Political offices
Preceded by José Francisco del Montenegro	Supreme Director of Nicaragua; In Granada; 1851	Succeeded by Fruto Chamorro
