= Honduran intervention in Nicaragua (1851) =

Military expedition

1851 Honduran Expedition to Nicaragua
Date	1851
Location	Nicaragua
Result	Honduran victory: Overthrow of José Trinidad Muñoz

Combatants
Honduras; El Salvador (Nicaragua) Granadans rebels	Nicaragua

Commanders and leaders
(Honduras) Juan Lindo (Nicaragua) José Laureano Pineda Ugarte	(Nicaragua) José Trinidad Muñoz (surrendered)

The 1851 Honduran Expedition to Nicaragua was a military expedition carried by the Honduran Army to return José Laureano Pineda Ugarte to power after being overthrown by José Trinidad Muñoz

Muñoz, expelled from El Salvador, orchestrated the August 4, 1851, uprising in León, Nicaragua, overthrowing José Laureano Pineda. Initially, Muñoz became Minister of War, but the plan for a theocratic-military government shifted. Facing charges, Muñoz surrendered when Honduras and Granada forces besieged León, securing a general amnesty except for him and seven military leaders. The government later extended amnesty to all, ending the revolt.
