= José María Estrada =

President of Nicaragua in 1855 (1802-1856)

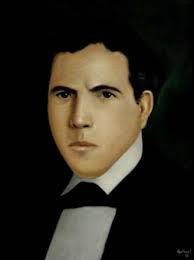

President of Nicaragua Acting
- In office 12 March 1855 – 22 October 1855
- Preceded by: Fruto Chamorro
- Succeeded by: Patricio Rivas (Provisional)

Personal details
- Born: José María Estrada Reyes; 1802 Granada, New Spain
- Died: 13 August 1856 (aged 53–54) Ocotal
- Citizenship: Nicaragua
- Party: Conservative
- Occupation: Politician, lawyer

José María Estrada Reyes (1802 – 13 August 1856 in Ocotal) was the President of Nicaragua after Fruto Chamorro’s death during the Filibuster War, serving from 12 March to 23 October 1855.

Estrada was born in 1802 in the Conservative capital of Granada. He was president of the Nicaraguan Congress from 1854 to 1855. He was ratified as the provisional president of the Legitimists on 10 April 1855, a month after Chamorro's death. In disgust of the efforts of peace promoted by José Trinidad Muñoz, and mediation offered by the president of El Salvador, Estrada continued the war, losing to William Walker. When Walker took over Granada on October 13, he appointed Patricio Rivas as the new President of Nicaragua. Estrada abandoned the Nicaraguan presidency on 23 October 1855. Estrada fled the country soon after, returning to reorganize a Legitimist government in Somotillo on 21 June 1856. He appointed Tomás Martínez as the Commander in Chief of the military, who would eventually become President after Walker was driven out of the country.

Political offices
Preceded by Fruto Chamorro	President of Nicaragua; 1855	Succeeded by Patricio Rivas
