= Benito Rosales =

President of Nicaragua (1795–1850)

José Benito Rosales y Sandoval (1795 in Granada – 1850) was a conservative Nicaraguan politician and lawyer who served as acting Supreme Director of Nicaragua between March 8 and April 1, 1849.

Rosales was born in 1795 in Granada. He studied law at the university there and later became the dean of the university. He later became a member of the Legitimist Party.

After Agustín de Iturbide left power, the Assembly of Deputies of the United Provinces of Central America met to discuss the situation and future fate of the region. Rosales was one of the three Nicaraguan ambassadors.

He later published the newspaper El Ojo del Pueblo, Revista Conservadora del Pensamiento Centroamericano, printed in Granada. In it, he emphasised the need to make Managua the administrative center of the region.

He was president of the Nicaraguan Congress from 1839 to 1841.

When Supreme Director José María Guerrero was forced to resign due to health problems, he appointed Bernardo Toribio Terán Prado in his place. In March, the parliament replaced Terán with Rosales, who served until new elections.

Political offices
Preceded by Toribio Terán (acting)	Supreme Director of Nicaragua (acting); 1849	Succeeded by Norberto Ramírez
