= Justo Abaunza =

Costa Rican-born Nicaraguan lawyer and politician

Supreme Director of Nicaragua Provisional
- In office 1 April 1851 – 5 May 1851
- Preceded by: Norberto Ramírez
- Succeeded by: Laureano Pineda
- In office 4 August 1851 – 2 November 1851
- Preceded by: Laureano Pineda
- Succeeded by: Fulgencio Vega

Personal details
- Born: 1778 Nicoya, Province of Costa Rica, Captaincy General of Guatemala
- Died: 1872 (aged 93–94) El Salvador

Justo Abaunza y Muñoz de Avilés (1778 – 1872) was a Costa Rican-born legitimist Nicaraguan lawyer and politician who served as acting Supreme Director of Nicaragua from 1 April to 5 May 1851, and as provisional Supreme Director appointed by José Trinidad Muñoz from 4 August to 2 November 1851.

== Biography ==
=== Early career ===
In 1803, Marcelo de los Santos Porras, priest of the town of Masaya, stated that according to the baptismal books and the last census practiced in his parishioners, there were Spanish residents suitable for public service, all between ages 25 and 60, such as Lieutenant Abaunza, who was the sub-delegate of the Party of Nicoya. On 13 July 1804 he was appointed sub-delegate of the Party of Sutiaba against the opinion of the Governor of the Province.

He was a Commissioner, alongside Fulgencio Vega, of the Provisional Government of Silvestre Selva during Malespín's War, named after Francisco Malespín, who with the help of Granadan conservatives occupied and allowed the looting of the churches of León.

He was accused of causing the death of 54 innocent civilians by Bernabé Somoza moments before his execution.

=== As Supreme Director ===
He was appointed acting Supreme Director on 1 April 1851 before his elected successor, Laureano Pineda, took office on 5 May of the same year.

On 4 August 1851 a coup led mainly by José Trinidad Muñoz, with support from other conservative leaders at the time, overthrew Pineda and forced him into exile in Honduras, where he declared himself Supreme Director in dissidence. Muñoz appointed senators Abaunza in León and José Francisco del Montenegro in Granada. Montenegro died suddenly only 6 days into his administration and was replaced by senator José de Jesús Alfaro.

Abaunza and Alfaro would rule jointly under the supervision of Muñoz until 2 November 1851 when militia under Fruto Chamorro supported by the returning Pineda from Honduras with help from Juan Lindo began to siege León. Abaunza surrendered followed by Alfaro in Granada handing over power to Fulgencio Vega and Pineda.

==== Peace Negotiations ====
During the negotiations, it was achieved that Abaunza was included in the amnesty decree, but subject to what the Legislative Assembly decided, because he was a senator, and therefore enjoyed immunity.

It is not known what the opinion of the Assembly on Abaunza waws, but it is known that he moved to El Salvador, where he was appointed, along with José María Silva, to draft the Civil Code and make Reforms to the Penal Code of El Salvador, according to It is stated in the Executive Agreement of 4 February 1858.

Political offices
Preceded by Norberto Ramírez	Supreme Director of Nicaragua (acting); 1851	Succeeded by Laureano Pineda
Preceded by Laureano Pineda (in dissidence in Honduras)	Supreme Director of Nicaragua (provisional); 1851	Succeeded by Fulgencio Vega; Laureano Pineda
