= The Nicaragua Dispatch =

- Type: Online
- Editor: Tim Rogers
- Founded: 2011
- Headquarters: Granada, Nicaragua
- Website: www.nicaraguadispatch.com

The Nicaragua Dispatch is an independent online English-language news website based in Granada, Nicaragua.

Launched on October 17, 2011, by U.S. journalist Tim Rogers, the online newspaper identifies itself as a "community publication for the digitalized, global era" by including reader-submitted blogs and opinion pieces. In its first year of publication, The Nicaragua Dispatch signed a syndication and electronic distribution agreement with The Christian Science Monitor, both of which reprinted its articles.

In a 2011 interview The Tico Times called Rogers "a journalist's journalist" whose stories from Nicaragua "run the gamut from exclusive interviews with Nicaragua's rich and powerful insiders to features on poor Nicaraguan kids pursuing dreams on a dusty baseball field." In 2012, Nicaraguan Spanish-language daily Confidencial said The Nicaragua Dispatch is filling a need to provide English-language news to readers inside and outside of the country as well as "guarantee access to information" for all foreigners interested in Nicaragua.

Although the website signed off briefly in July 2013, it resumed publishing on a more limited basis two months later.
