= Partido Democrático =

Partido Democrático can refer to:

- Democratic Party (East Timor)
- Democratic Party (Nicaragua)
- Democratic Party (Portugal)
- Democratic Party (United States)
- Democratic Party (Italy)
