= Francisco Castellón =

President of the León-based opposition government of Nicaragua from 1854-55

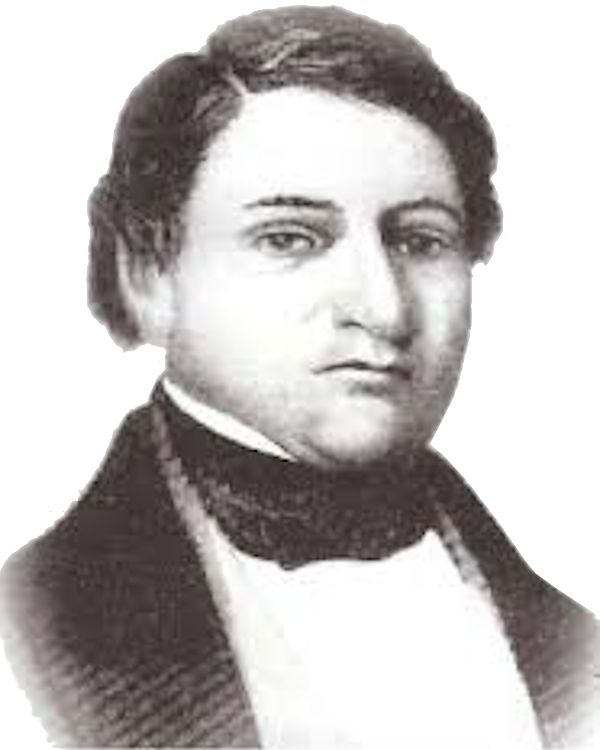
Francisco Castellón Sanabria (1815-1855)

Francisco Castellón Sanabria (1815 – 8 September 1855) was president of "Democratic" Nicaragua from 1854 to 1855 during the Granada-León civil war.

Castellón was a lawyer from León. He was prime minister (ministro general) under Patricio Rivas, but was removed in 1841 by Pablo Buitrago, and reappointed in 1843 by Manuel Pérez. In 1844 he served as Nicaragua's minister to England and later as Nicaragua's minister to France. He was again a government minister under Laureano Pineda 1851–1853.

In 1853, the Liberal Party candidate Francisco Castellón from León and the Conservative Party candidate Fruto Chamorro of Granada both ran for the position of Supreme Director of Nicaragua. Chamorro won, but there were claims of election fraud. Chamorro immediately transferred the government headquarters from Managua to Granada, the Conservative stronghold. He then convened a Constitutional Assembly on 20 January 1854, to promulgate a new Constitution during the absence of the majority of the Liberal Party representatives. The rigged election and Chamorro's subsequent actions including the promulgation of the Constitution of 1854, considered to be badly flawed by the Liberals, provoked prominent Liberals - including Francisco Castellón, Máximo Jerez, and José María Valle - to establish a separate government which they did in León. Castellón was proclaimed president on 11 June 1854.

Although his forces were initially militarily successful against Chamorro, a long unsuccessful siege of Granada was followed by the loss of Managua, Masaya and Rivas. This led Castellón to hire William Walker and his mercenaries, who arrived in June 1855. Castellón died of cholera on 8 September 1855 and was succeeded as "Democratic" president by Nazario Escoto.

== Bibliography ==
- Jamison, James Carson (1909) With Walker in Nicaragua: Or, Reminiscences of an Officer of the American Phalanx E.W. Stephens Publishing Company, Columbia, MO, OCLC 1711985
- Bancroft, Hubert Howe (1887) "Chapter XII: Republic of Nicaragua 1838-1855" History of Central America, 1501-1887 volume 8, History Company, San Francisco, pp. 238–263
