= 1912 Nicaraguan general election =

- 2 November 1912
- Presidential election
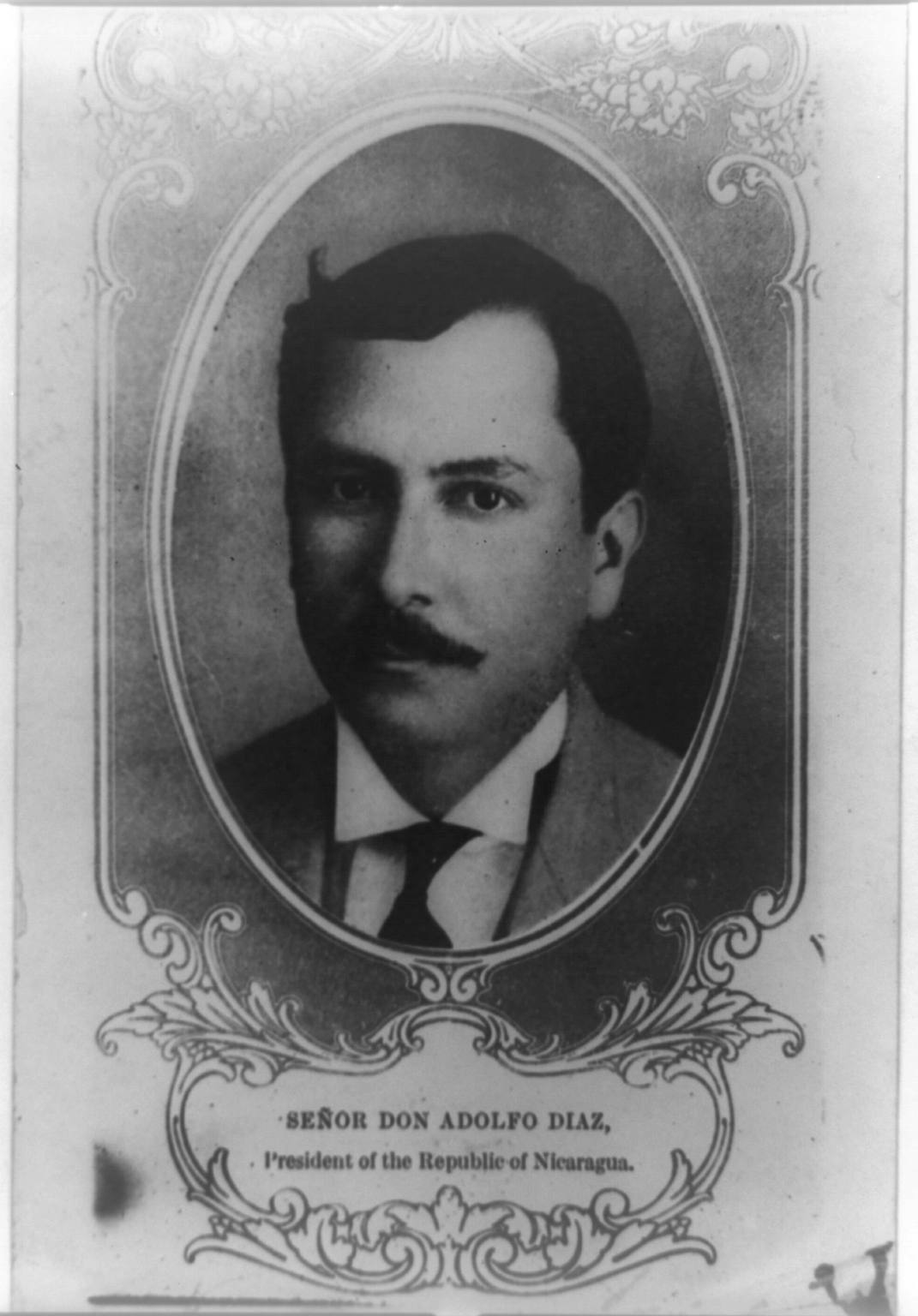

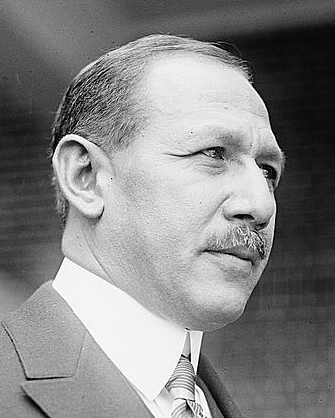
| Nominee | Adolfo Díaz | Emiliano Chamorro Vargas |
| Party | Conservative | Conservative |
| Popular vote | 23,467 | 2,229 |
| Percentage | 91.17 | 8.66 |
President before election
Adolfo Díaz
Conservative
Elected President
Adolfo Díaz
Conservative

General elections were held in Nicaragua on 2 November 1912 to elect a president and Constitutional Assembly. The presidential elections were won by Adolfo Díaz of the Conservative Party, although neither of the two opposition candidates were official. The Liberal Party did not contest the elections due to pressure from the United States.

== Results ==
=== President ===
| Candidate | Party | Votes | % |
|---|---|---|---|
| Adolfo Díaz | Conservative Party | 23,467 | 91.17 |
| Emiliano Chamorro Vargas | Conservative Party | 2,229 | 8.66 |
| Francisco Baca | Liberal Party | 43 | 0.17 |
| Total | | 25,739 | 100.00 |
Source: Nohlen
