= Potosí, Nicaragua =

Potosí
- Municipality
- Location in Nicaragua
- Coordinates: 11°30′N 85°53′W
- Country: Nicaragua
- Department: Rivas

Area
  - Municipality: 56 sq mi (144 km^{2})
- Elevation: 207 ft (63 m)

Population (2005)
  - Municipality: 11,904
  - Density: 214/sq mi (82.7/km^{2})
  - Urban: 4,752
- Time zone: UTC−05:00
- Postal code: 48300

Potosí (Spanish pronunciation: [potoˈsi]) is a municipality in the Rivas department of Nicaragua. The primary industry is agriculture.

It is the birthplace of Don José Laureano Pineda.
