= Laureano Pineda =

Nicaraguan lawyer and politician

José Laureano Pineda Ugarte
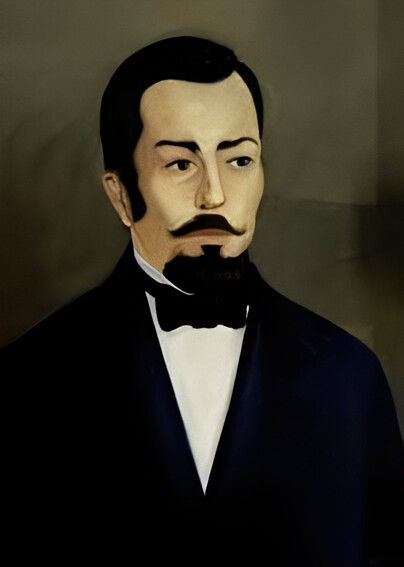

Supreme Director of Nicaragua
- In office 11 November 1851 – 1 April 1853
- Leader: José Trinidad Muñoz
- Preceded by: Fulgencio Vega
- Succeeded by: Fruto Chamorro
- In office 4 August 1851 – 2 November 1851
- Preceded by: Justo Abaunza
- Succeeded by: Fulgencio Vega
- In office 5 May 1851 – 4 August 1851
- Preceded by: Justo Abaunza
- Succeeded by: Justo Abaunza

Personal details
- Born: 4 July 1802 Potosí, Rivas, Captaincy General of Guatemala
- Died: 17 September 1853 (aged 51) Managua, State of Nicaragua
- Party: Democratic
- Spouse: Dolores Sacasa Méndez
- Parent(s): Pedro Benito Pineda; Juana Rufina Ugarte Selva
- Occupation: Politician, lawyer

José Laureano Pineda Ugarte (4 July 1802 – 17 September 1853) was a Nicaraguan lawyer and politician who, as a Senator in the Legislative Assembly and member of the Democratic Party, was appointed to serve as 7th and later 8th Supreme Director of the State of Nicaragua on three occasions. originally elected on 1 April 1851, later in dissidence in Honduras after being removed from office as a result of a military coup led by José Trinidad Muñoz, and finally alongside Fulgencio Vega from 11 November the same year.

== Background ==
He was born in Potosí on 4 July 1802, He was son of Pedro Benito Pineda, head of State of Nicaragua (1826–1827) and Juana Rufina Ugarte Selva.

He married Dolores Sacasa Méndez, daughter of Crisanto Sacasa y Parodi, the first Nicaraguan conservative leader, and María Méndez Díaz de Figueroa, daughter of Nicaraguan military leader Bernardo Méndez de Figueroa.

== Early Political Career ==
In 1825 he graduated in law from the Royal University of León, of liberal ideology, from a young age he supported the Independence of Central America from Spain.

In 1835 he wrote the First Penal Code of Nicaragua which was approved by the National Assembly in 1839. He also served Minister of Government under Supreme Director José León Sandoval.

=== English Invasion ===
He was elected deputy to the Constituent Assembly of 1848 and was one of the few who refused to sign the Treaty of Cuba which was imposed by the British Empire after invading and reaching Lake Nicaragua. The treaty took effect the same year and Nicaragua ceded the port city of San Juan del Norte to the Mosquito Coast. He was president of the Nicaraguan Congress in 1849.

== As Supreme Director ==
Pineda won the 1851 elections on 1 April, but could not take office. In his place Senator Justo Abaunza was appointed office until 5 May when Pineda finally took that position.

=== 1851 Coup d'état ===
On 4 August 1851 General Commander José Trinidad Muñoz staged a military coup against Pineda, overthrowing him and reappointing Abaunza as interim Supreme Director in León, José Francisco del Montenegro in Granada and forcing Pineda and his cabinet into exile in Honduras, where he would declare himself as Supreme Director in dissidence.

Montenegro would die 6 days after taking office on 11 August, and he would be subsequently replaced by José de Jesús Alfaro.

Pineda, with military support from Honduran President Juan Lindo, returned to Nicaragua setting out to lay siege to León. The troops were led by brigadier general Fruto Chamorro. The city capitulated on the condition that Pineda grant Abaunza amnesty, but this decision was overturned by the Nicaraguan parliament, which found that Abaunza already had parliamentary immunity. According to Francisco Castellón, the Bishop of San Salvador, Jorge de Viteri y Ungo, was behind these intrigues.

=== After the coup ===
Initially, Pineda shared power with Fulgencio Vega, but later he was in power alone. He carried out an administrative reform in the country and, together with Vega, made Managua the capital of the country once and for all on 15 February 1852 in order to eliminate the confrontation between Granada and León.

== Death and legacy ==
He died on 17 September 1853. His government administration was progressive, he created schools, improved roads and reformed the administrative structure of the State. He is considered one of the best rulers of Nicaragua in the 19th century, before the Filibuster War.

Political offices
Preceded by Justo Abaunza	Supreme Director of Nicaragua (overthrown by Muñoz); 1851	Succeeded by Justo Abaunza

Political offices
Preceded by Justo Abaunza	Supreme Director of Nicaragua (in dissidence in Honduras); 1851	Succeeded by Fulgencio Vega

Political offices
Preceded by Fulgencio Vega	Supreme Director of Nicaragua (alongside Vega); 1851 – 1853	Succeeded by Fruto Chamorro
