= José María Guerrero de Arcos =

Nicaraguan lawyer and politician

José María Guerrero de Arcos y Molina
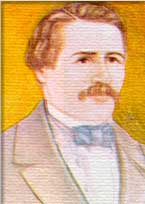

Honduran Council of Ministers 1839
- In office 27 April 1839 – 10 August 1839
- Preceded by: Juan José Alvarado
- Succeeded by: Mariano Garrigó

Supreme Director of Nicaragua
- In office 6 April 1847 – 1 January 1849
- Leader: José Trinidad Muñoz
- Preceded by: Miguel Ramón Morales (Acting)
- Succeeded by: Toribio Terán (Acting)

Personal details
- Born: 1799 León, Captaincy General of Guatemala
- Died: 1853 (aged 53–54) Nicaragua
- Party: Republican

José María de la Cruz Guerrero de Arcos y Molina (1799 – 1853) was a Nicaraguan lawyer and politician, member of the short lived centrist Republican Party, who served in the 1839 Honduran Council of Ministers and as the 5th Supreme Director of Nicaragua from 6 April 1847 to 1 January 1849.

== Family ==
José María Guerrero de Arcos y Molina, son of Pastor Guerrero y Arcos Ángulo and Dionicia Molina y Poveda, married with Juana Casco who procreated: José Leocadio, Paula y Manuela del Carmen Guerrero de Arcos y Casco; in second married with Esmeralda Guerrero de Arcos, daughter of Maximino Guerrero de Arcos and Joaquina Guerrero, who procreated: Máximino, Esmeralda, Valeria, José de la Luz, José Valentín, Miguel Gerónimo Guerrero de Arcos.

== As Counselor of Honduras ==
=== Battle of Espíritu Santo ===
In early 1839, due to ideological differences, Nicaragua and Honduras invaded El Salvador, still part of the Federal Republic of Central America. On 5 April, the invading troops were defeated by General Francisco Morazán, and immediately afterwards, he advanced into Honduras in an attempt to overthrow the government of Juan Francisco de Molina. Molina, seeing that the troops were nearing Comayagua, resigned, and on 13 April 1839 minister Felipe Neri Medina formed a council of ministers and assumed leadership. Medina would very quickly resign due to the immense pressure caused by Morazán's counter invasion, and so did the minister after him, Juan José Alvarado, and so Guerrero would take leadership on 27 April of the same year.

=== Peace Treaty ===
Due to the planned insurgency, the lawyer Justo José de Herrera was appointed to appear as the diplomatic representative of Honduras, before the Salvadoran government led by Antonio José Cañas and thus hold talks to avoid an imminent war that would end with disastrous losses for both governments. The "Peace Treaty" would be signed on 5 June 1839, by the representatives of both states, minister José Miguel Montoya of El Salvador and Justo José de Herrera of Honduras. Among the agreements were the commitment to pay compensation and attend the Central American Diet of Santa Ana, in order to strengthen peace on 15 August of the same year. On 10 August Guerrero had handed over power to minister Mariano Garrigó and had returned to Nicaragua.

== As Supreme Director of Nicaragua ==
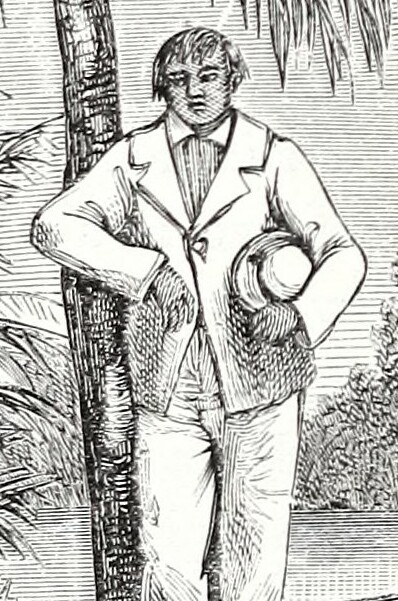
George Augustus Frederic II, King of the Mosquito Coast at that time of the invasion.

When José León Sandoval stepped down as Supreme Director, Guerrero ran as the new Supreme Director. He did not succeed in getting the 2/3 majority required by the constitution in the parliament, and so the parliament appointed Miguel Ramón Morales as acting head of state. However, on 6 April of the same year, he would be unanimously appointed as Supreme Director by the Legislative Assembly.

=== English Invasion ===
In November, already in the administration of the state, Guerrero, asked the United States of America to mediate between the Nicaragua-England conflict; Subsequently, on 20 January 1848, English ships disembarked troops in the San Juan River and advanced on Lake Nicaragua, with the purpose of controlling the entirety of Nicaragua. Given this, Guerrero and the Legislative Assembly maneuvered with political skill and approved the ratification of an Anglo-Nicaraguan Agreement in Cuba preserving Nicaraguan sovereignty over the Great Lake of Nicaragua.

=== Resegnation ===
On 1 January 1849 Guerrero was forced to resign due to health problems, and he appointed Senator Toribio Terán as Supreme Director. On 8 March parliament appointed Benito Rosales as the new Supreme Director, who would oversee the 1849 elections, which were won by Norberto Ramírez, who took office on 1 April of the same year. Ramírez would be the only Supreme Director to serve out their full term.

Political offices
Preceded by Juan José Alvarado	Honduran Council of Ministers; 1839	Succeeded by Mariano Garrigó

Political offices
Preceded by Miguel Ramón Morales (acting)	Supreme Director of Nicaragua; 1847 – 1849	Succeeded by Toribio Terán (acting)
