= Juan de Dios Orozco =

Nicaraguan politician

Juan de Dios Orozco was a Nicaraguan politician who served as acting Supreme Director of Nicaragua from 1 April to 31 May 1843.

In 1823 Mexican Emperor Agustín de Iturbide began plans to annex the Federal Republic of Central America. Intendant of León, Bishop Nicolás García Jerez, a supporter of the annexation plans, left the city, and Orozco formed a commission with Dionisio Urcuyo y Crespín and Juan Hernández, alcalde of Sutiaba, which appointed Brigadier González Saravia as the new intendant of the city.

In 1843, the previous Supreme Director, Pablo Buitrago y Benavente resigned and the Parliament appointed Orozco as Acting Supreme Director, who held the position until the Parliament elected a new Supreme Director. Originally, public elections were attempted, but failed because no candidate obtained the required majority vote.

He was president of the Nicaraguan Congress from 1843 to 1845.

Political offices
Preceded by Pablo Buitrago y Benavente	Supreme Director of Nicaragua (acting); 1843	Succeeded by Manuel Pérez
