= Norberto Ramírez =

Nicaraguan lawyer & politician (1802–1856)

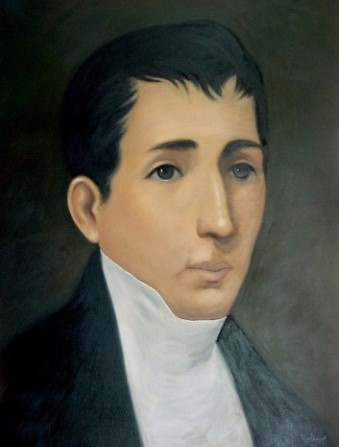

Head of State of El Salvador
- In office 20 September 1840 – 7 January 1841; Acting Head of State
- Preceded by: Antonio José Cañas
- Succeeded by: Juan Lindo

Supreme Director of Nicaragua
- In office 1 April 1849 – 1 April 1851
- Preceded by: Benito Rosales
- Succeeded by: Justo Abaunza

Personal details
- Born: 15 April 1802 León, Captaincy General of Guatemala, Viceroyalty of New Spain
- Died: 11 July 1856 (aged 54) León, State of Nicaragua
- Party: Legitimist

Norberto Ramírez Áreas (15 April 1802, León, Nicaragua – 11 July 1856, León, Nicaragua) was a Nicaraguan lawyer and politician who served as acting Supreme Chief of El Salvador (20 September 1840 – 7 January 1841), still technically a part of the Federal Republic of Central America, and as the 6th Supreme Director of independent Nicaragua (1 April 1849 – 1 April 1851).

== Background ==
He was born in León on 15 April 1802 and studied law at the university there.

He was the father of Mercedes Ramírez de Meléndez, whose sons Carlos and Jorge Meléndez were later presidents of the Republic of El Salvador.

== In El Salvador ==
On 20 September 1840 a revolt of the garrison in San Salvador led by General Francisco Malespín forced the resignation of Ramírez's predecessor, Colonel Antonio José Cañas. (Malespín had intended to rule through Cañas, but Cañas was not agreeable.) After José Damián Villacorta rejected the appointment, Ramírez took over the government.

In December 1840 a riot broke out in Santiago Nonualco, led by Petronilo Castro, but was soon suppressed by the government. Despite the fact that Ramírez governed for a few months, he knew how to balance his short period of government, given the difficult political situation of that time.

The Constituent Assembly met on 4 January 1841, and on 7 January admitted the formal resignation of Colonel Cañas from the supreme leadership and appointed Juan Lindo as supreme head of the provisional state in his place. Ramírez handed over command to Lindo the same day, and he proceeded to be deputy chief along with Pedro José Arce and Joaquín Eufracio Guzmán who replaced Villacorta.

== In Nicaragua ==
He was president of the Nicaraguan Congress in 1846. On 5 March 1849 the Legislative assembly of Nicaragua declared Ramírez the elected Supreme Director, and he took office on 1 April. Ramírez ordered the commander of the army, Fruto Chamorro, to suppress constant revolts led by the liberal General Bernabé Somoza. He was caught and executed in Rivas.

=== Clayton–Bulwer Treaty ===
On 9 July he received the Plenipotentiary Minister of the United States of America in Central America, the historian Ephraim George Squier, who would arrive in Nicaragua on 5 September and be greeted by Nicaragua's former Supreme Director, Evaristo Rocha, in El Viejo. Squier brought Ramírez a message of solidarity from the United States with the state in the face of British claims. At the end of 1849, the supreme director sent the lawyer Eduardo Carcache to the city of Washington as extraordinary and plenipotentiary minister of Nicaragua in the United States, Carcache being the first with this position, he was commissioned by the Nicaraguan government to try to obtain the signing of a treaty on an interoceanic canal by Nicaragua and to win the support of the United States in the conflict with England regarding the occupation of the San Juan River and the Mosquito Coast.

The Clayton–Bulwer Treaty signed between the United States and the United Kingdom in 1850 signaled the relinquishment of claims to power and exclusive rights over the projected Nicaraguan canal. On 25 July that same year, the Treaty of Peace and Friendship with Spain was signed, which definitively recognized the independence of Nicaragua.

Political offices
Preceded by Antonio José Cañas	Head of State of El Salvador (provisional); 1840–1841	Succeeded by Juan Lindo
Preceded by Benito Rosales (acting)	Supreme Director of Nicaragua; 1849–1851	Succeeded by Justo Abaunza (acting)
