= Toribio Terán =

Nicaraguan politician (1785–1850s)

Bernardo Toribio Terán Prado (León, Nicaragua, 1785 – 1850s) was a conservative Nicaraguan politician who served as acting Supreme Director of Nicaragua from January 1 to March 8, 1849. He was president of the Nicaraguan Congress from 1849 to 1852.

Terán was born in León in 1785. He married Isabel Balladares and they had a son, Toribio Terán Balladares. He was a member of the Legitimist Party, which then dominated the politics of Nicaragua, and also a member of Parliament. When the previous Supreme Director, José María Guerrero, was forced to resign due to health problems, he appointed Terán in his place. In March, the parliament appointed José Benito Rosales y Sandoval to replace Terán.

Political offices
Preceded by José María Guerrero	Supreme Director of Nicaragua (acting); 1849	Succeeded by Benito Rosales (acting)
