= Fruto Chamorro =

Nicaraguan politician and military scientist

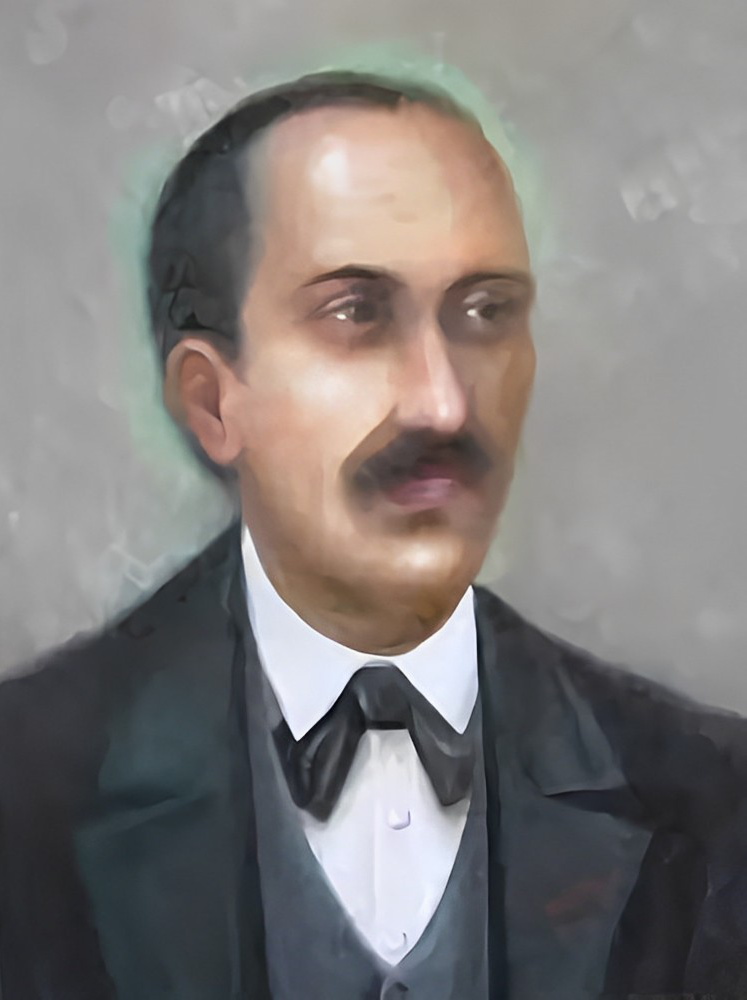
- Official portrait, c. 1854

1st President of Nicaragua
- In office 30 April 1854 – 12 March 1855
- Preceded by: Office Established (Himself as Supreme Director)
- Succeeded by: José María Estrada (Acting)

Supreme Director of Nicaragua
- In office 1 April 1853 – 30 April 1854
- Preceded by: Laureano Pineda
- Succeeded by: Office Abolished (Himself as President)

Personal details
- Born: José Fruto Chamorro Pérez; 20 October 1804 Guatemala City, Captaincy General of Guatemala, New Spain
- Died: 12 March 1855 (aged 50) Outside Granada, Nicaragua
- Cause of death: Dysentery
- Resting place: Granada Cemetery
- Party: Conservative
- Spouse: Mercedes Avilés
- Occupation: Politician, Military Scientist

José Fruto Chamorro Pérez (20 October 1804 – 12 March 1855) was a Nicaraguan politician and military scientist who served as 10th Supreme Director of Nicaragua (1 April 1853 – 30 April 1854) and 1st President of Nicaragua (30 April 1854 – 12 March 1855).

Born illegitimate in Guatemala City in 1804 to Bayardo Paez, he was initially known as Fruto Pérez. His father, Pedro José Chamorro Argüello, had come to Guatemala from Nicaragua for graduate studies. Fruto grew up in Guatemala and attended school there. His father returned to Nicaragua after completing his studies and married Josefa Margarita Alfaro Monterroso in 1814. They had six children, but Fruto was subsequently considered a member of this family, based on strategic needs related to administration of the family resources, for which the administrator was expected to be at least 25 years of age. He was acknowledged by his father shortly before the latter's death in 1824, and his stepmother insisted he use the name Fruto Chamorro Pérez.

The death of his father forced Fruto to leave his studies and go to Nicaragua to assume responsibility for the family and to manage the abundant inheritance of his father. His half brothers and sisters, Pedro Joaquín, Dionisio, Carmen, Mercedes and Fernando, grew under his guardianship.

Fruto's father was one of the founders of the Conservative Party of Nicaragua, centered on the city of Granada. Like his father, he was committed to the Conservative cause and became an activist of the Party. In 1836, he became a representative in the State Assembly. From 1839 to 1842, he was a Senator of the State of Nicaragua.

In 1842, an attempt was made to reestablish a union of Central American states as the Central American Confederation, in accord with the "Pact of Chinandega". It was to include El Salvador, Guatemala, Honduras, and Nicaragua. In 1843, Fruto Chamorro was appointed Supreme Director of the Confederation junta, and he took up residence in San Miguel, El Salvador. However, Guatemala withdrew, and Fruto was instrumental in preventing a war over the decision. The nascent Confederation collapsed in 1844.

In 1845, Fruto Chamorro was appointed Prefect and Military Governor of the Department of Granada, and Minister of the Treasury. In November 1851, during the administration of Supreme Director Laureano Pineda, he became Commander-in-chief of the Army.

Fruto Chamorro himself became Supreme Director of Nicaragua on 1 April 1853. Almost immediately and with support of the conservative oligarchy, he transferred the government headquarters to Granada, the Conservative stronghold. He then convened a Constituent Assembly on 20 January 1854, to promulgate a new Constitution during the absence of the majority of the western (Liberal Party) representatives, virtually expelled from the country by the government's move to Granada. In March, Fruto Chamorro relinquished his title as Supreme Director and with acquiescence of the Assembly, named himself President of Nicaragua.

The Liberals saw this as a restoration to power of the provincial oligarchy, continuation of a feudal economic system, and the diminished possibility of an alliance of all Central American reactionary forces as well.

Memorial to Fruto Chamorro Pérez Granada, Nicaragua

They initiated a civil war by establishing their own government in León in May 1854, with the support of the governments of Honduras and El Salvador. A force under the command of General Máximo Jerez was sent to besiege Granada. In preparation for the siege, President Chamorro placed himself at the headquarters of the Army and left executive authority with his deputy, José María Estrada. His defenses for Granada were successful and subsequent attacks failed to take the city.

A victim of dysentery, Fruto Chamorro died at his hacienda outside Granada on 12 March 1855. A few months later, the city was taken in a surprise attack by the filibuster William Walker.

He was married to Mercedes Avilés, without issue.

Political offices
Preceded by Fulgencio Vega; Laureano Pineda	Supreme Director of Nicaragua; In Granada; 1853 – 1854	Succeeded by Himself (as president); Francisco Castellón (in rebellion)
Preceded by Himself (as supreme director); Nazario Escoto (in rebellion)	President of Nicaragua; 1854 – 1855	Succeeded by José María Estrada (provisional); Patricio Rivas (in rebellion)
