= Máximo Jerez =

Nicaraguan politician

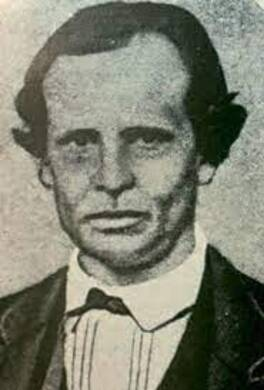

Máximo Jerez Tellería (8 June 1818 in León, Nicaragua – 12 August 1881 in Washington, D.C., USA) was a 19th-century Nicaraguan politician, lawyer and military leader. He is considered to be one of the greatest Liberal political thinkers in Nicaraguan history. He was a leader of the movement towards Central American unity.

== Career ==
Together with Francisco Castellón Sanabria, he participated in bringing William Walker's filibusters to Nicaragua and on 31 October 1855 was designated Minister of Foreign Relations in Walker's provisional government, led officially by Patricio Rivas. He ran for the presidency in 1856, but no candidate obtained an absolute majority. By Walker's decision, provisional President Rivas summoned new elections on 10 March 1856, but countermanded the decree on 14 March, and broke relations with Walker.

On 23 January 1857 Jerez formed a dual Junta government with the Conservative Tomás Martínez and they acted jointly as Presidents of Nicaragua, from 24 June 1857 to 19 October or 15 November 1857. In his subsequent career as Minister Plenipotentiary of Nicaragua to Costa Rica, he signed on 15 April 1858, the Cañas–Jerez Treaty that defined the boundaries between the two countries.

In 1876 he organized from El Salvador an expedition to overthrow the provisional government of Pedro Joaquín Chamorro Alfaro, but failed.

In the city of León, there is a statue in his honor.
