= Nazario Escoto =

President of Nicaragua

Nazario Escoto Donaire was acting President of "Democratic" Nicaragua after the death of Francisco Castellón (1815–1855) during the Granada-León civil war.
