= Patricio Rivas =

Nicaraguan politician

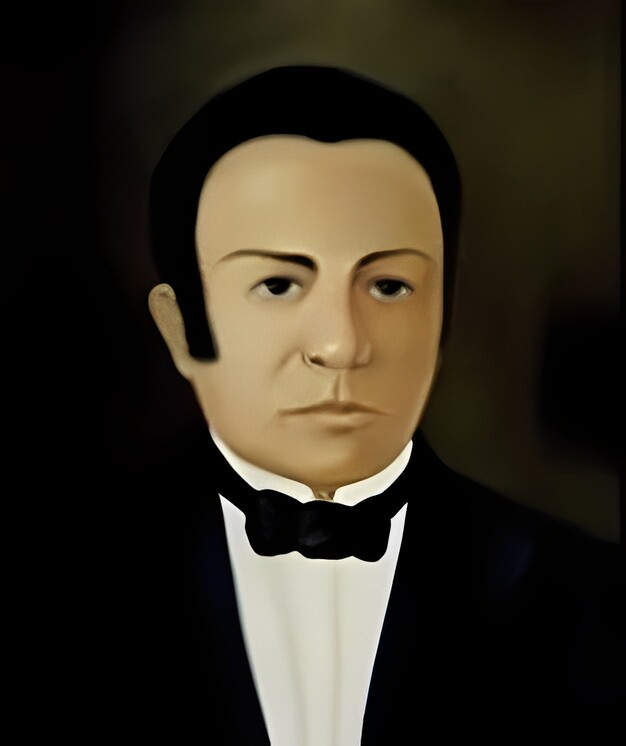

President of Nicaragua Provisional
- In office 25 October 1855 – 24 June 1857
- Preceded by: José María Estrada
- Succeeded by: Government Junta; William Walker (Usurper); Tomás Martínez (As President)

Supreme Director of Nicaragua Acting
- In office 30 June 1839 – 27 July 1839
- Leader: Casto Fonseca
- Preceded by: Evaristo Rocha (Acting); Joaquín del Cossío (Acting, until May 15)
- Succeeded by: Joaquín del Cossío (Acting)
- In office 21 September 1840 – 4 March 1841
- Preceded by: Tomás Valladares (Acting)
- Succeeded by: Pablo Buitrago

Personal details
- Born: 1810
- Died: July 12, 1867 (aged 56–57) León, Nicaragua
- Party: Democratic
- Occupation: Politician

Patricio Rivas (1810 – July 12, 1867) was a wealthy liberal Nicaraguan lawyer and politician, member of the Democratic Party, who served as Acting Supreme Director of Nicaragua from June 30, 1839 to July 27, 1839 and from September 21, 1840 to March 4, 1841. Later he served as a president of one of the several competing governments of Nicaragua from October 30, 1855 to June 24, 1857. However, he was merely a puppet president; rule was held by William Walker.

== As Supreme Director ==
When Nicaragua gained its independence under Dr. José Núñez on 30 April 1838, the first government was a transitional one, first transitioning into full independence and then to a constitutional order. Núñez would resign very quickly in, handing over power to Joaquín del Cossío, but Evaristo Rocha also took that position and they both ruled somewhat jointly until 30 June 1839.

=== First and Second Terms ===
On 30 June 1839 Rocha handed over power to Rivas, who essentially served as acting leader of the second transitional government until 27 July the same year, when he handed over power to Cossío once again.

During Cossío's second term he ended the transitional government and began preparing the state for elections, after which he handed over power to Hilario Ulloa to serve as Acting Supreme Director, but Ulloa quickly resigned and gave power to Tomás Valladares.

Valladares also resigned very quickly and was replaced by Rivas once again, who would oversee the 1841 elections which were won by Pablo Buitrago y Benavente.

== As President ==
In 1855, Patricio Rivas was appointed Provisional President as a result of an agreement signed in Granada between the Legitimist General Ponciano Corral and the filibuster William Walker, de facto head of the democratic side. This agreement was rejected by the legitimist José María Estrada who was the acting president.

Rivas had the support of Walker at the beginning of his government. Due to the patriotic attitude of the government of the Costa Rican President Juan Rafael Mora Porras against the presence of the filibusters in Nicaragua, the government of Rivas declared war on Costa Rica in early 1856, invading Guanacaste. However, the Costa Ricans commanded by Juan Rafael Mora, defeated the filibusters in the battle of Santa Rosa and the Second Battle of Rivas (not to be confused with the First Battle of June 29, 1855, and in which Enmanuele Mongalo had a heroic role to burn the Mesón de Máximo Espinoza).

The candidacies of Rivas, Máximo Jerez, and Trinidad Salazar were presented at convened elections to elect a new president. None obtained an absolute majority and it seemed that Congress was going to choose Jerez. However, Walker wanted to be called new elections. Rivas, eager to get rid of the tutelage of the filibuster, moved from Granada to León, where Walker arrived in June 1856, still in apparent cordiality. But, when Walker left, Rivas moved the government to Chinandega and repealed his decree calling for elections. Walker then announced in Granada the deposition of Rivas and his replacement by the proxy government of Fermín Ferrer.

Rivas declared Walker a traitor in Nicaragua, and remained at the head of the government in the western region of the country, where the armies of Guatemala and El Salvador arrived shortly after, attacking the cities of Granada and Masaya. For its part, the Costa Rican army expelled the filibusters from the San Juan river basin.

Walker capitulated on May 1, 1857. Shortly thereafter, on June 24, a triumvirate took office, composed of Máximo Jerez and Tomás Martínez Guerrero, which ended the turbulent government of Patricio Rivas.

Rivas was popularly known with the nickname of "Patas Arribas".

Political offices
Preceded by Evaristo Rocha (acting); Joaquín del Cossío (acting, until may 15)	Supreme Director of Nicaragua (acting); 1839	Succeeded by Joaquín del Cossío (acting)

Political offices
Preceded by Tomás Valladares (acting)	Supreme Director of Nicaragua (acting); 1840 – 1841	Succeeded by Pablo Buitrago

Political offices
Preceded by José María Estrada	President of Nicaragua (appointed by Walker); 1855 – 1857	Succeeded by Tomás Martínez
