= Tomás Martínez =

President of Nicaragua (1820–1873)

Tomás Martínez Guerrero
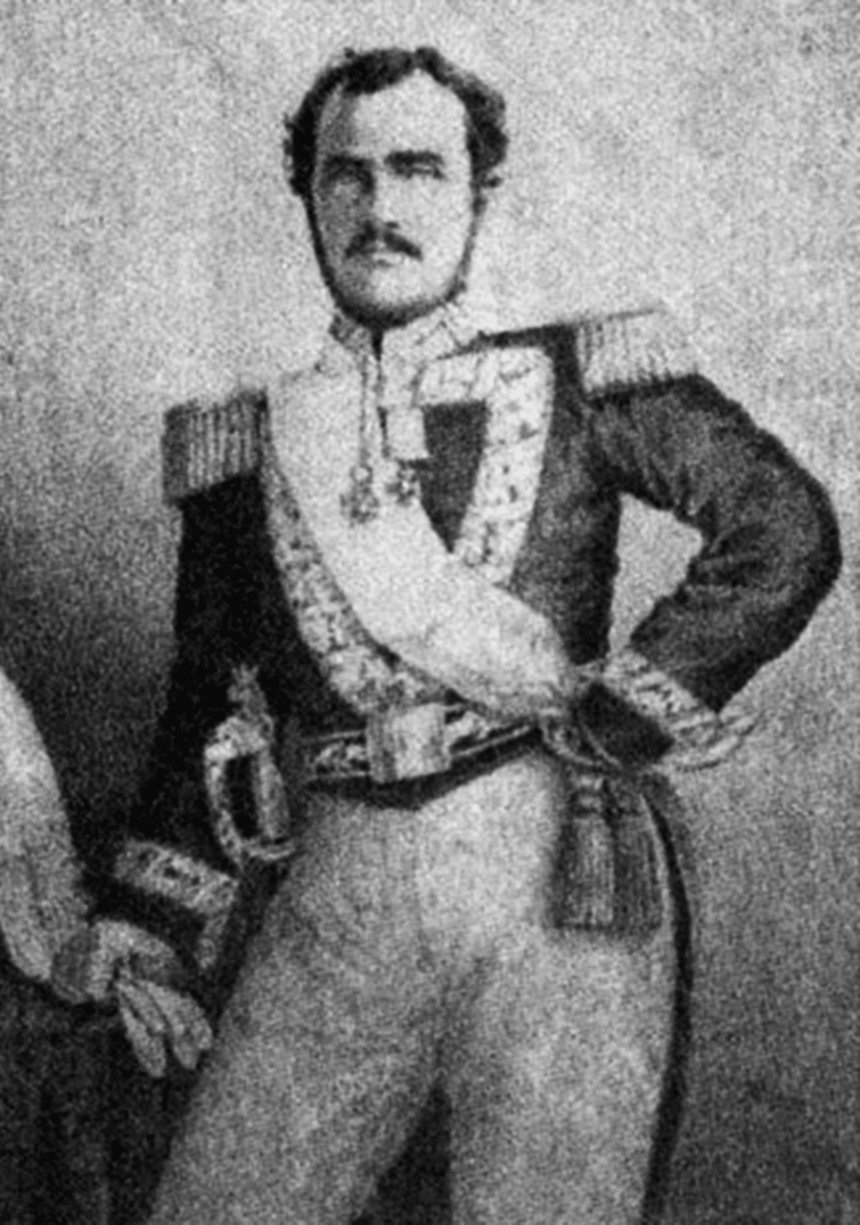

President of Nicaragua
- In office 15 November 1857 – 1 March 1867
- Preceded by: Government junta
- Succeeded by: Fernando Guzmán Solórzano

Personal details
- Born: 21 December 1820 Nagarote, Captaincy General of Guatemala, New Spain
- Died: 12 March 1873 (aged 52) León, Nicaragua
- Party: Conservative
- Occupation: Politician, military scientist

Tomás Martínez Guerrero (21 December 1820 – 12 March 1873) was the President of Nicaragua between 15 November 1857 and 1 March 1867. From 24 June 1857 to 19 October or 15 November 1857, he acted jointly as the 2nd president in a dual junta with the Liberal Máximo Jerez formed on 23 January.

He was born in Nagarote, son of Joaquín Martínez and María Guerrero Mora. He was put in power by the other Central American countries after they drove out William Walker in 1857. His main task as President was to restore order following the civil war. A member of the Conservative Party, he began a period of 35 years of conservative rule in Nicaragua.

He died in León, Nicaragua.

Political offices
Preceded by Patricio Rivas	President of Nicaragua; 1857–1867	Succeeded by Fernando Guzmán
