= Legitimist Party (Nicaragua) =

Center-right political party in Nicaragua from 1838 to 1851

Legitimist Party Legitimista
- Historical leaders: José Chamorro Argüello, José Núñez, Pablo Buitrago y Benavente, Norberto Ramírez, Fruto Chamorro
- Founded: 15 September 1823 (202 years, 188 days)
- Dissolved: 27 October 1851 (174 years, 146 days)
- Succeeded by: Conservative Party
- Headquarters: Managua
- Ideology: Conservatism (Nicaraguan)
- Political position: Right-wing
- Colors: Blue

The Legitimist Party (Spanish: Partido Legitimista, PL) was a conservative Nicaraguan political party, the first in its country. The power base of the Legitimist Party was in Granada. The Legitimists were opposed to the Democrats. After several years of civil war between the Legitimists and the Democrats, a provisional government was established in June 1857 which had as its joint leaders the Legitimist Tomás Martínez and the Democrat Máximo Jerez.

The Nicaraguan Conservative Party defined itself as a continuation of the Legitimist Party and traces its history back to PL's foundation in 1823.

== Sources ==
- Info
- Rutahsa Adventures' Nicaragua-Honduras Excursion 2005!
- Publications | International IDEA
