= José Trinidad Muñoz =

Nicaraguan military general and politician

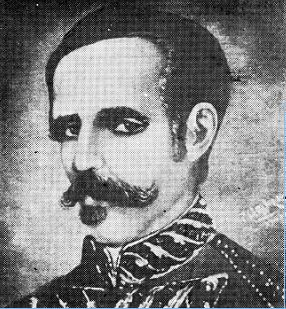

General Commander of Arms Nicaragua
- In office 6 April 1847 – 18 August 1855
- Preceded by: Casto Fonseca
- Succeeded by: position abolished

Personal details
- Born: 1790 Granada, Captaincy General of Guatemala
- Died: 18 August 1855 (aged 64–65) El Sauce, Nicaragua

Military service
- Allegiance: Honduras (1838–1845); Selva's Nicaragua (1844–1845); Nicaragua (1845–1854); Walker's Nicaragua (1854–1855)
- Rank: General
- Commands: Army of the Legitimist Party (1844–1851); Army of the Democratic Party (1851–1855)

José Trinidad Muñoz (1790 – 18 August 1855) was a Nicaraguan military general who served as the de facto military leader of Nicaragua in 1845, and again from 1847 to 1855, preceded by Casto Fonseca.

== Background ==
Muñoz was the son of a Spanish military man, Jorge Trinidad Muñoz. He studied military affairs at the Heroic Military Academy in Mexico and later headed the Military Academy in Nicaragua. He was given the title "Pacificador de las Segovias" during an asymmetric war against the indigenous peoples of northern Nicaragua and signed the "Acta de San Juan de Limay" with other Nicaraguan military officials.

== Dissolution of the Federal Republic of Central America ==
In October 1838, the Honduran government under Francisco Ferrera informed the Central American government that auxiliaries from Nicaragua could no longer cross Honduran territory.

Fruto Chamorro ordered Muñoz, who commanded the Honduran troops, not to obstruct the passage of the troops. Muñoz disobeyed the order, and when the Nicaraguan troops reached Choluteca on 17 August, they were forced to leave Honduran territory. When they failed to do so, Muñoz attacked them and they were defeated in a three-hour battle on 19 August. According to Muñoz, 156 Nicaraguans were killed and many captured, as well as over 200 muskets.

== Malespín's War ==
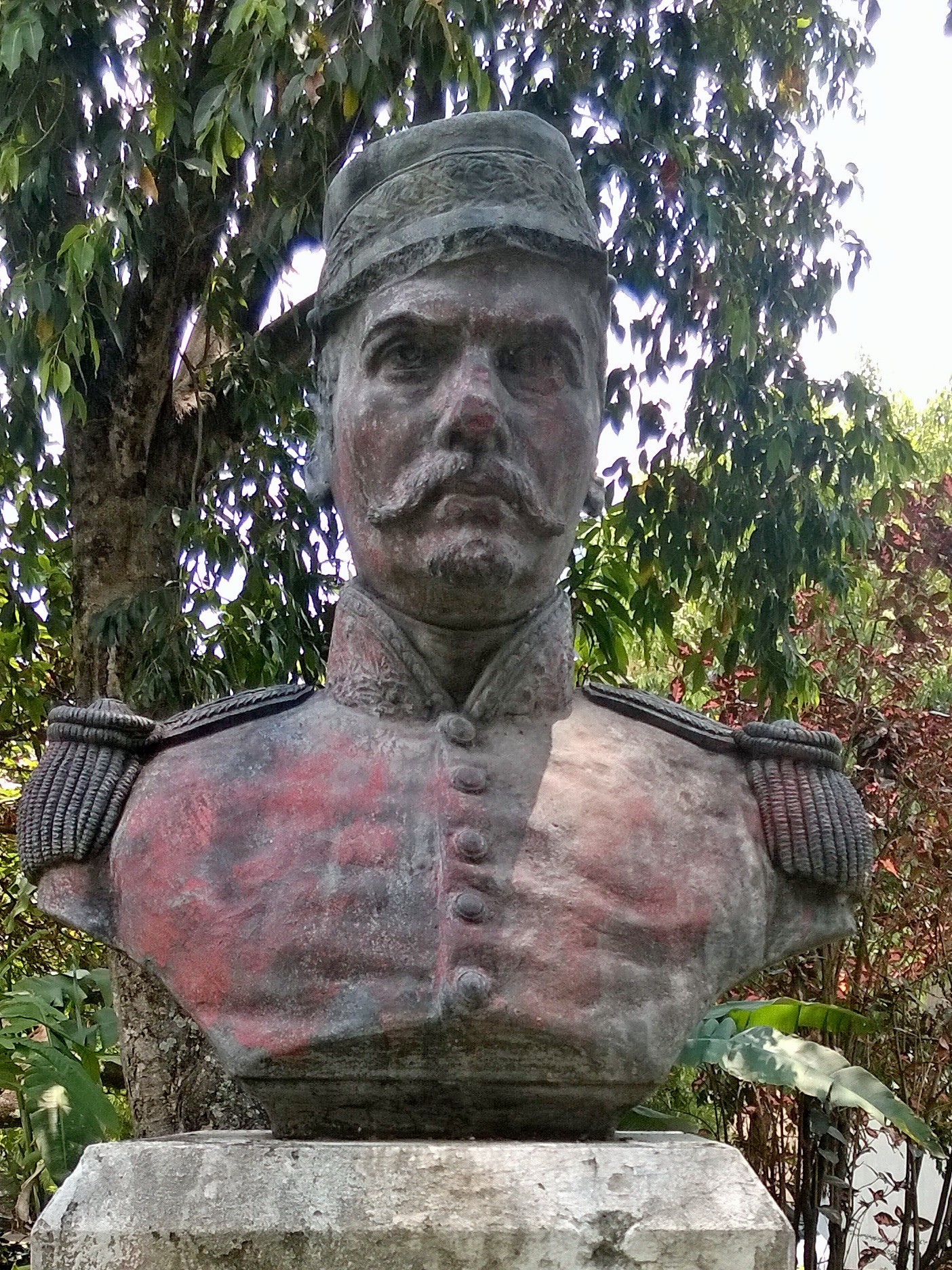
Bust of President Francisco Malespín in the University of El Salvador

On 25 October 1844, Salvadoran President Francisco Malespín, handed over the presidency to his Vice President, Joaquín Eufrasio Guzmán, and began leading his troops towards Nicaragua with support from the Honduran Government under Ferrera.

On 26 November 1844, the invading forces reached León, and on 27 November began a 59 day siege. On the same day, at 3 p.m., the first attack was initiated and ended disastrous for the attackers, however, the attack continued until 4 p.m. when allied troops ran out of ammunition and scores of their officers were killed or injured. Disorder ensued and the Honduran troops began to withdraw, but Malespín convinced them to stay in combat and the attack continued, under the command of Muñoz. The following night, Muñoz entrenched, and by the morning of the next day, the allied troops were ready for an effective attack.

=== Counter-Government in Masaya ===
After Casto Fonseca, the de facto military leader of Nicaragua, under the title General Commander of Arms, fell from power in early January 1845, Malespin appointed Muñoz as the new General Commander of Arms.

Also in early January of the same year, Blas Antonio Sáenz and José León Sandoval formed a counter-government against Silvestre Selva Sacasa in Masaya, who was appointed by Malespín to serve as provisional Supreme Director during the War. Sáenz was formally declared Supreme Director on 20 January.

==== End of the War ====
After Malespín was overthrown by his Vice President in El Salvador, he signed a peace treaty in León with Sandoval, and Muñoz was resigned to the leadership of that city.

=== After the War ===
In early July 1849, troops under Muñoz put down an uprising in Rivas led by Bernabé Somoza.

On 4 August 1851 Muñoz led a coup against Supreme Director Laureano Pineda and forced him and his cabinet to flee to Honduras. After the coup, he became a member of the Democratic Party.

== Filibuster War and Death ==
In October 1854, Francisco Castellón entered into a contract with US military contractor Byron Cole to supply 200 men led by William Walker in June 1855. Muñoz became commander-in-chief of the troops of the Democratic Party, which had power in León under Castellón against the presidency of Ponciano Corral and José María Estrada.

=== Battle of El Sauce ===
On 18 August 1855, in the cholera ridden flatlands of El Sauce, conservative troops led by José Santos Guardiola from Honduras awaited 600 Liberal troops led by Muñoz. The first rush overran the Conservatives' trenches and destroyed a cannon, but Muñoz received a fatal shot in the ribs, and relinquished his command to Colonel José María Sarria.

Political offices
| Preceded by Casto Fonseca | General Commander of Arms; 1847 – 1855 | Succeeded by Position Abolished (Humberto Ortega in 1979) |
