= Democratic Party (Nicaragua) =

Center-left political party in Nicaragua from 1838 to 1936

Democratic Party Partido Democrático
- Historical leaders: Patricio Rivas, Laureano Pineda, William Walker, José Santos Zelaya, José María Moncada, Juan Bautista Sacasa
- Founded: 1838; 188 years ago
- Dissolved: 1928; 98 years ago
- Merged into: Nationalist Liberal Party
- Headquarters: León, Nicaragua
- Ideology: Liberalism (Nicaraguan)
- Political position: Before 1893: Left-wing; 1893–1909: Centre-left; After 1909: Big tent (Note: After 1909, the Democratic Party was divided into pro-American right-wing liberals (such as those who later formed the base for the Somoza dynasty) and anti-imperialist left-wing liberals (such as the forces led by Augusto César Sandino).)
- Colors: Maroon

The Democratic Party (Spanish: Partido Democrático, PD), renamed in 1893 as the Liberal Party (Spanish: Partido Liberal, PL), was a Nicaraguan political party in the 19th century. The power base of the liberal Democratic Party was in the city of León; while their conservative counterparts were centered in Granada. The Democrats were opposed to the Legitimists who expelled the Democrats from the constitutional assembly in 1853, driving them underground or into exile, and promulgated a constitution of 1854.

The Democrats rejected the constitution and the Legitimist government and fought against it with the help of filibuster William Walker.

When José Santos Zelaya came to power in July 1893, the Democratic Party was renamed the Liberal Party.

The liberal parties in Nicaragua have their roots in the historical Democratic Party.

== History ==
Starting in 1838, Nicaraguan politics were split between the Liberal mindset that was centered in León and the opposition—the Conservative mindset—was based in Grenada. In 1909, the Democratic Party of Nicaragua discovered its first major calamity—and setback as a political party concerned with its further influence in its country—when the United States came out in favor of the Conservative Party's interests. From 1912 to 1925, the United States helped the Conservatives maintain stability from rebellious factors in Nicaragua with a small detachment of US Marines.

== Sources ==
- http://jrscience.wcp.muohio.edu/FieldCourses00/PapersCostaRicaArticles/CostaRicain1856.Defeating.html
- http://www.rutahsa.com/nica-05.html
