= Granada, Nicaragua =

Granada
- Municipality
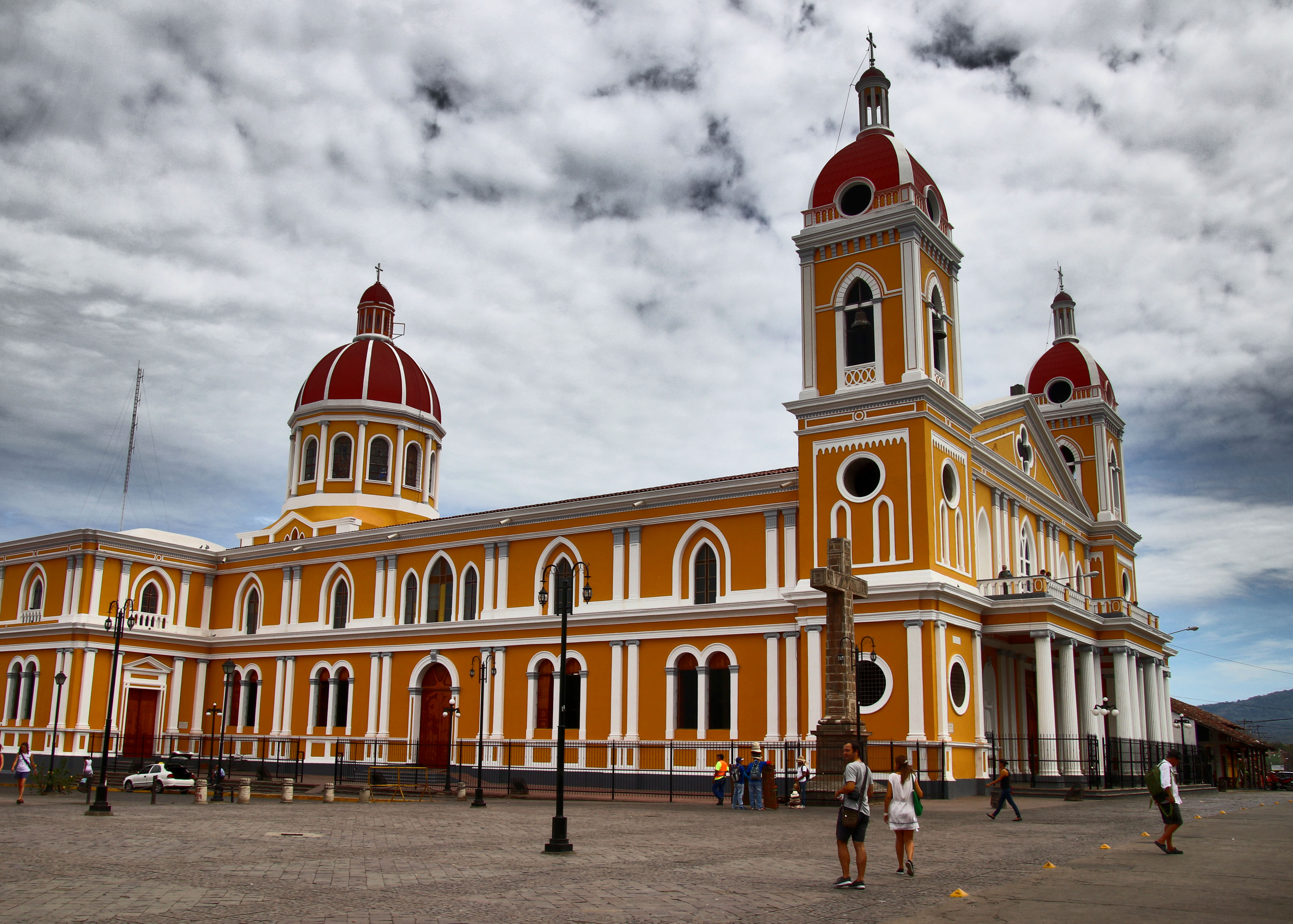
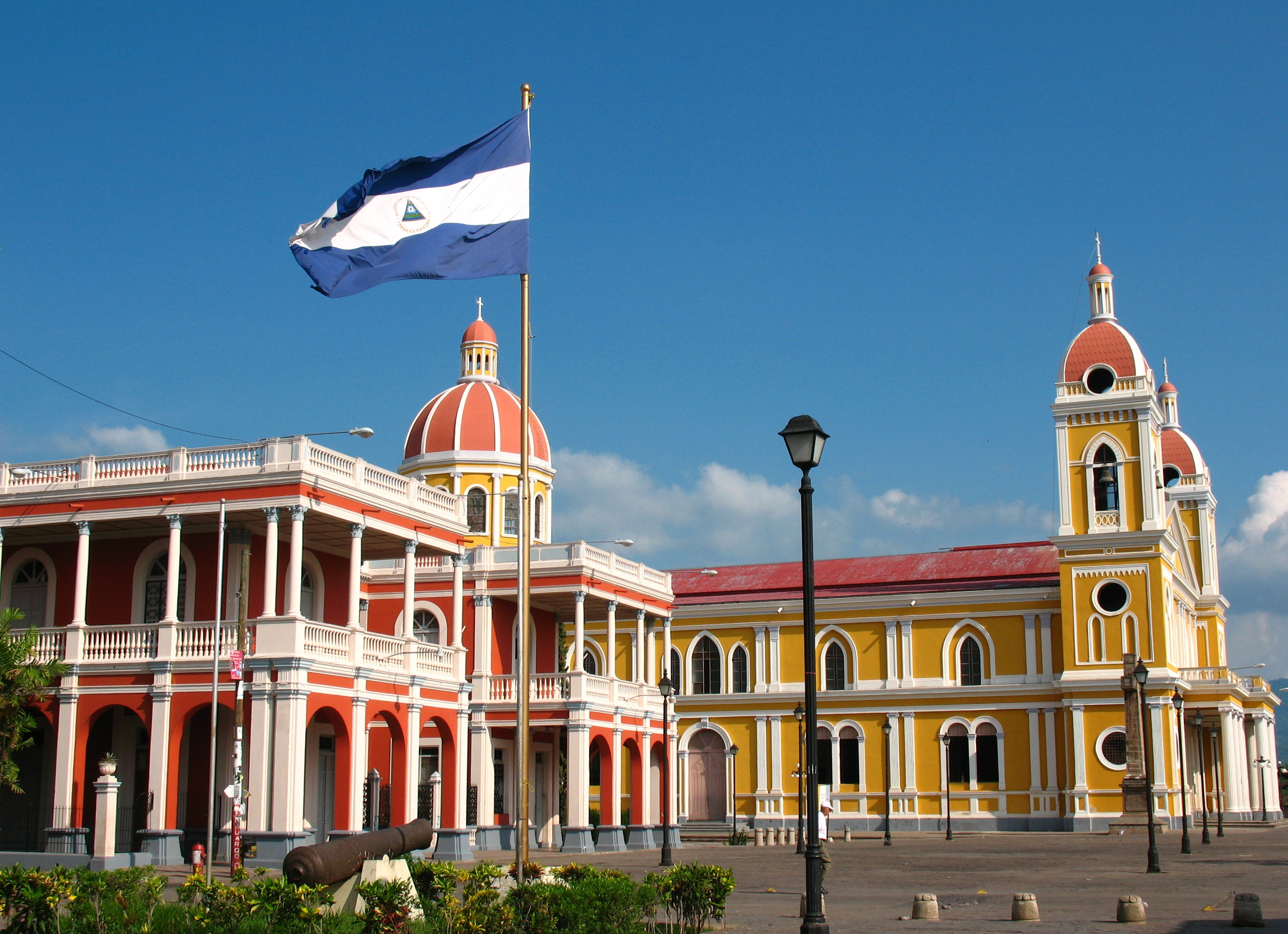
- The Granada Cathedral Plaza de la Independencia

- Flag Seal

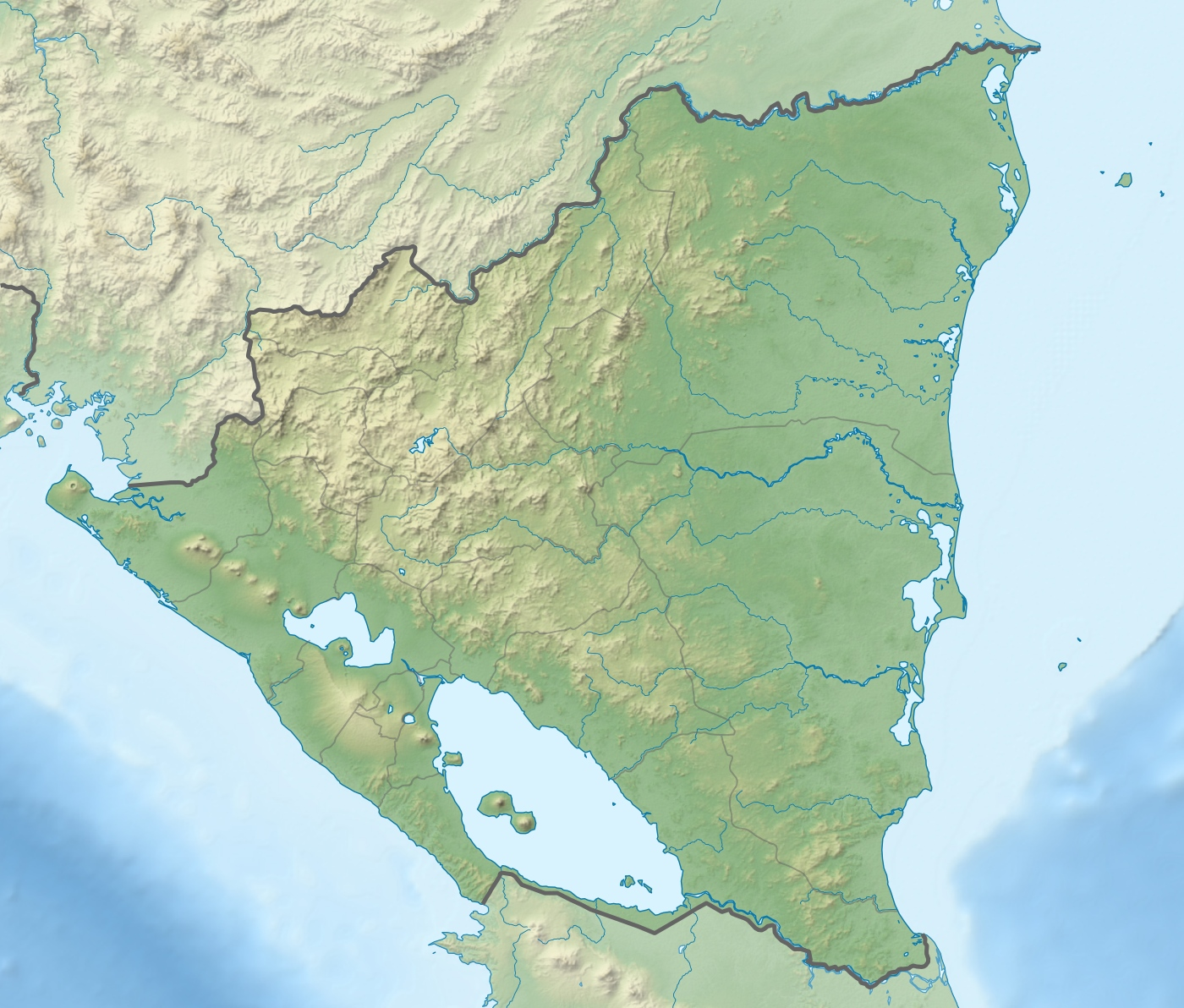
- Location in Nicaragua
- Coordinates: 11°56′N 85°57′W
- Country: Nicaragua
- Department: Granada
- Founded: 21 April 1524; 502 years ago

Area
  - Municipality: 229 sq mi (592 km^{2})

Population (2022 estimate)
  - Municipality: 134,104
  - Density: 587/sq mi (227/km^{2})
  - Urban: 105,862 (9th Nicaragua)
- Climate: Aw

Granada (Spanish pronunciation: [ɡɾaˈnaða]) is a city in western Nicaragua and the capital of the Granada Department. With an estimated population of 105,862 (2022), it is Nicaragua's ninth most populous city. Granada is historically one of Nicaragua's most important cities, economically and politically. It has a rich colonial heritage, seen in its architecture and structure.

Granada had a thriving indigenous population. In 1524, the city was renamed Granada, by Francisco Hernández de Córdoba, ostensibly the first European city in mainland America. Unlike other cities that claim the same distinction, the city of Granada was not only the settlement of the conquest, but also a city registered in official records of the Crown of Aragon, and the Kingdom of Castile in Spain.

Granada is also known as La Gran Sultana, in the reflection of its Moorish and Andalusian appearance, unlike its sister city and historical rival León, which displays Castilian trends.

== History ==
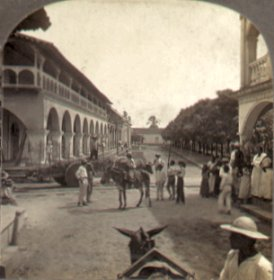
Granada street scene, circa 1905

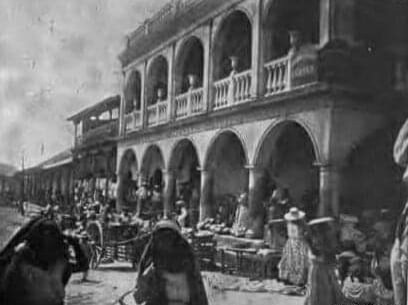
Old Market Building of Granada in 1880

The settlement of Granada was established by Spanish conquistador Hernández de Córdoba, who named it after the city of the same name in Spain. This was done in honor of the city's capture by the forces of King Ferdinand II and Queen Isabella I from the Emirate of Granada, which completed the reconquista. During the colonial era, Granada was a sister city to the settlement of Antigua Guatemala, maintained a flourishing level of commerce with ports in the Atlantic Ocean via Lake Cocibolca and the San Juan River, and was subject to attacks from English, French and Dutch pirates who unsuccessfully attempted to take control of the settlement by sailing up the San Juan River.

For many years Granada disputed with León its hegemony as the major city of Nicaragua. The city of Granada was favored by the Conservatives, while Léon was favored by the Liberals. For many years there was conflict that at times became quite violent between the cities' families and political factions. In the mid-19th century a compromise site was agreed on and the capital was finally established at Managua between both cities. As of 1850, Granada had a population of approximately 10,000.

On 29 May 1834, Cándido Flores, head of the military forces of Granada, revolted against the Government in León led by José Núñez, demanding the reform of the federal Constitution. After being defeated in Managua he could not organize a resistance in Granada, so he left the city to a disorganized mob that committed lootings and robberies, especially in the houses of foreigners.

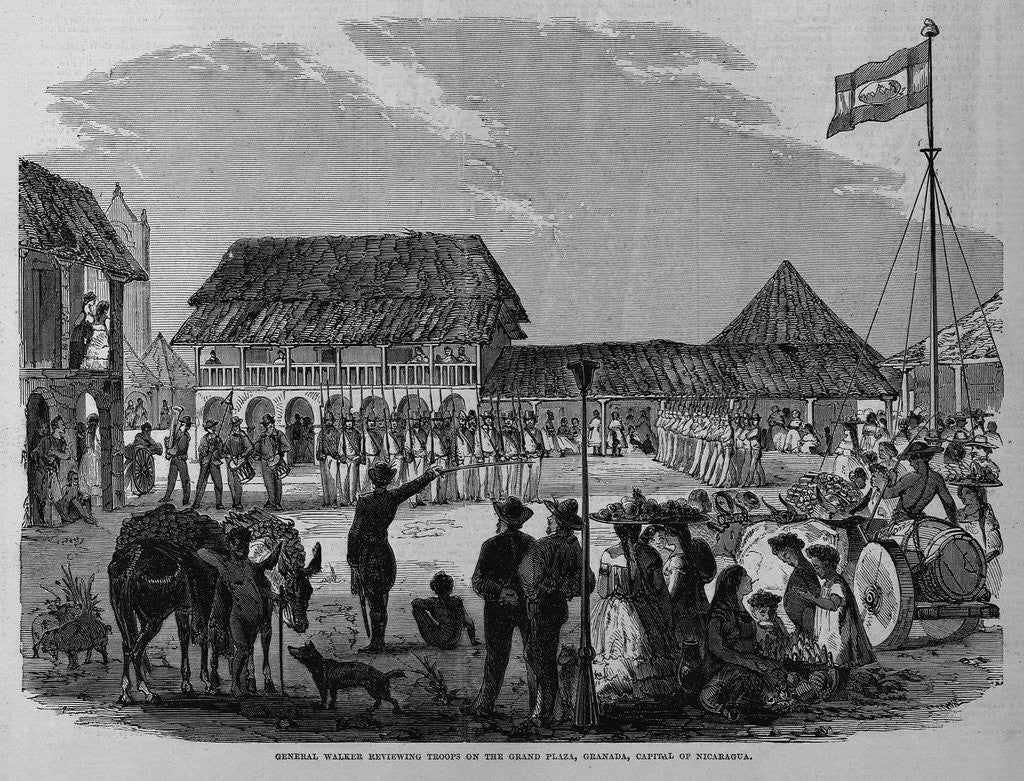
American-born General William Walker reviewing his troops on the Grand Plaza, Granada, capital of Nicaragua. Illustration for Frank Leslie's Illustrated Newspaper, June 21 of 1856.

Granada was also the site where American filibuster William Walker took up residence and attempted to take control of Central America and create independent colonies with economies based on slavery. One of Walker's generals, Charles Frederick Henningsen, set the city ablaze before escaping, destroying much of the colonial-era architecture and inscribed the words "Here was Granada" on the ruins before he left.

Granada avoided much of the tumult of the Sandinista Era in the 1970–80s.

== Geography ==
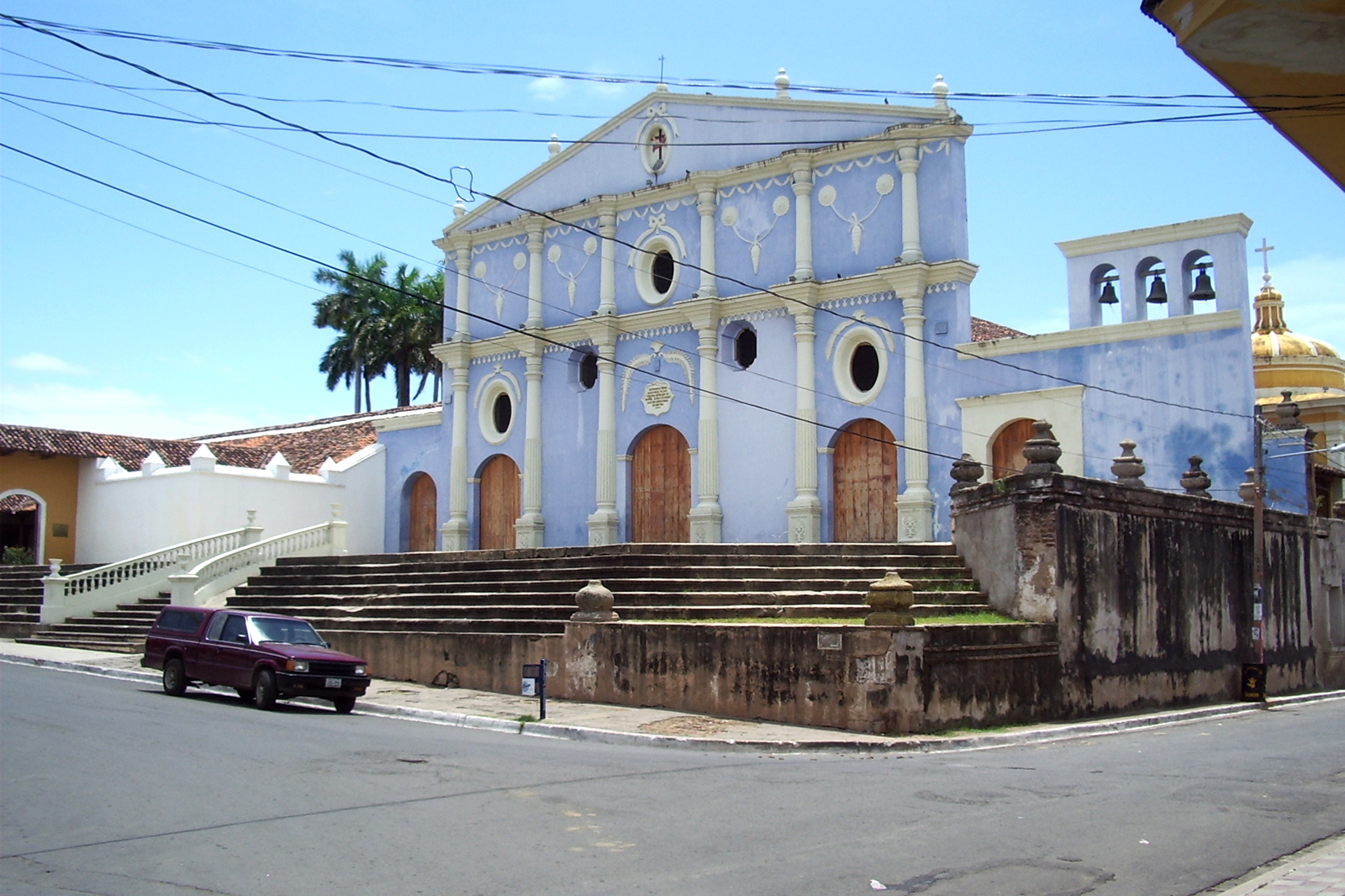
San Francisco Convent Church, built in 1685-late 18th century by the Franciscans.

Granada is located along the coast of the Lake Nicaragua (a.k.a. Lake Cocibolca), the world's twentieth largest lake.

Physiographically, the city occupies a low-lying alluvial terrace within the Nicaraguan Depression (or Central Nicaraguan Graben), bounded by the volcanic flanks of Mombacho to the south and the tectonic basin of Lake Cocibolca to the east.

Granada is the capital city of the Department of Granada, which borders Boaco and Managua to the north, Masaya and Carazo to the east and Rivas to the south. Within the same department, the River Tipitapa which connects the Lake of Managua and Nicaragua passes through it in the north. It also has three volcanic lagoons; Manares, Genirzaro, and the famous Apoyo. Apoyo, which is shared with the Department of Masaya, is the largest volcanic lagoon in Nicaragua.

Granada is a very warm city all year round, with very similar temperatures to Managua. This is due to similarities in geography with its close proximity to a lake and surrounded by high hills. Rainfall in Granada is approximately between 1,100 and 2,100 mm annually, with an annual average temperature reported to be 25.7 °C.

The vegetation around Granada is a reflection of its climatology. Dry and humid forests skirt the Mombacho volcano. The volcano is also home to a wide array of fauna (See Wildlife of Nicaragua). The lake is also home to many creatures, both marine and freshwater creatures. It is the only freshwater lake in the world where sharks live (Nicaragua shark). Fishing in the lake is quite good, and fishermen, both commercial and recreational, regularly catch guapote and mojarras, as well as sardines. Nicaragua has recently banned fishing of the Nicaragua shark and sawfish because of population decline.

Other cities and towns within the Granada district include Malacatoya, El Paso, El Guayabo, Diria, Macatepe, El Guanacaste, Nandaime and Diriomo, known nationally as the last city of witches. Mombacho volcano is the highest point (1,345 m) within Granada; the now dormant volcano blew most of its cone into the lake, forming the 365 Islets of Granada. It is also possible on a clear day to see Ometepe and Zapatera Islands. The later island is the second largest island in Lake Nicaragua, and also harbors an inactive volcano. The largest is Ometepe Island, also located in Lake Nicaragua. Several pre-Columbian statues and idols were found on the island during the Spanish conquest, and now exhibited in the Convento San Francisco Museum, as well as in other museums and parks located on Ometepe Island.

Granada has several beaches on Lake Nicaragua which are very popular around Semana Santa ("Holy Week").

== Economy and tourism ==
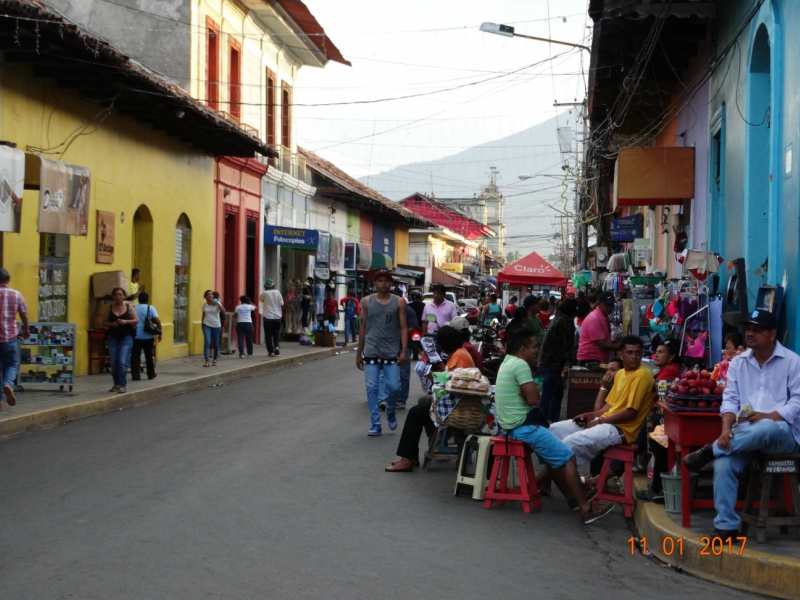
Atravesada street

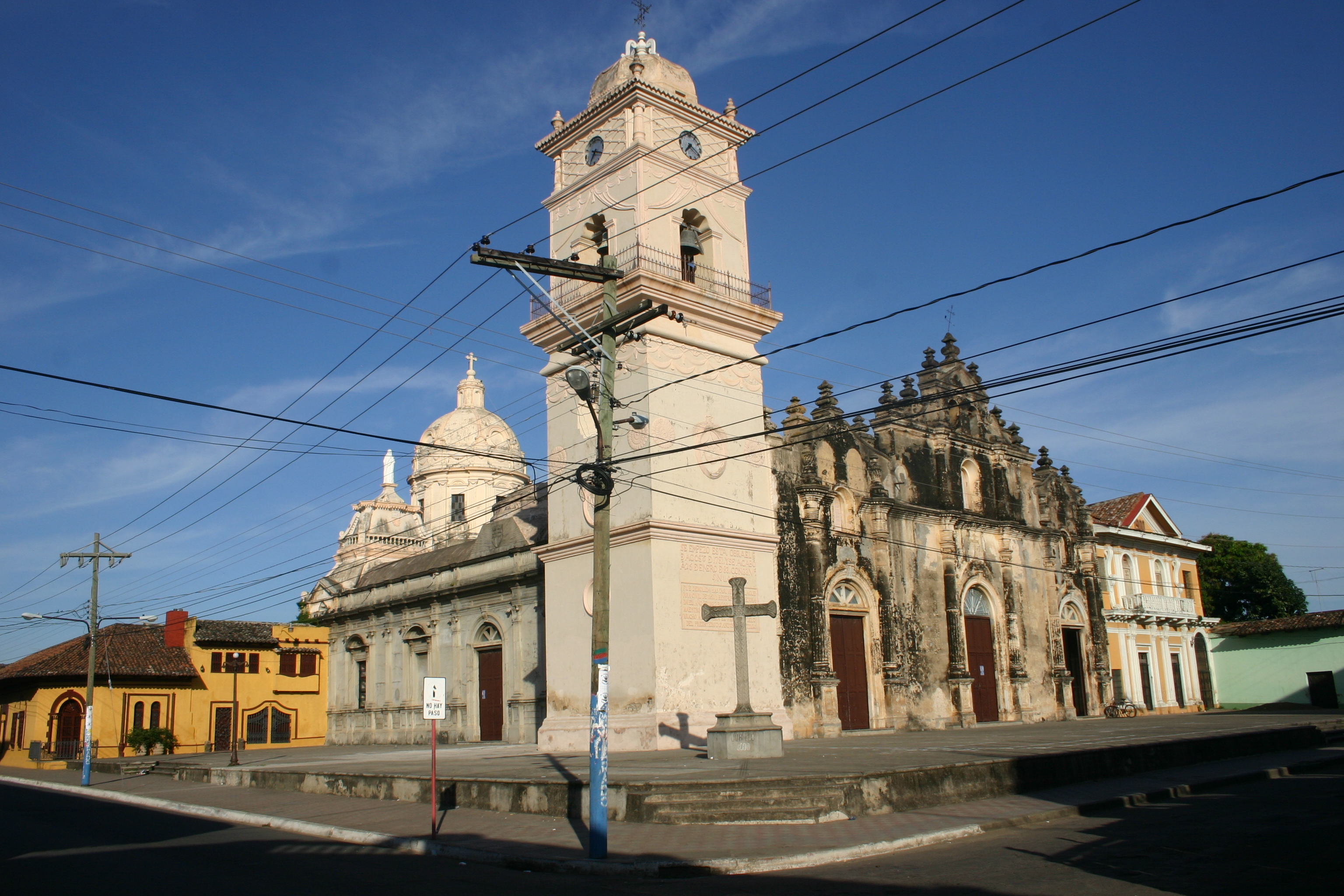
Preserved Colonial Church of Nuestra Señora de la Merced, built in 1534–1783, by the Order of the Blessed Virgin Mary of Mercy.

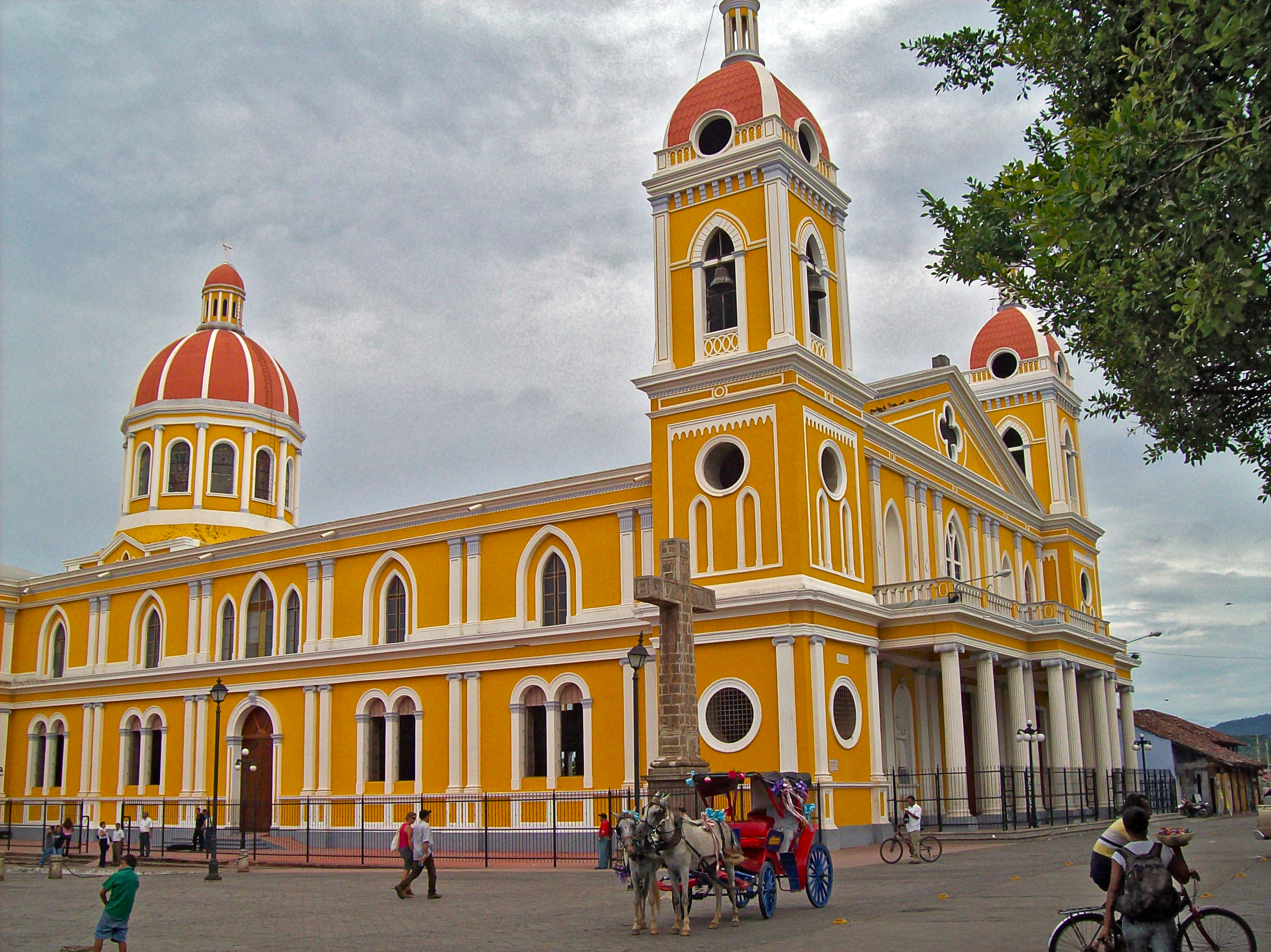
Granada Cathedral built in 1751.

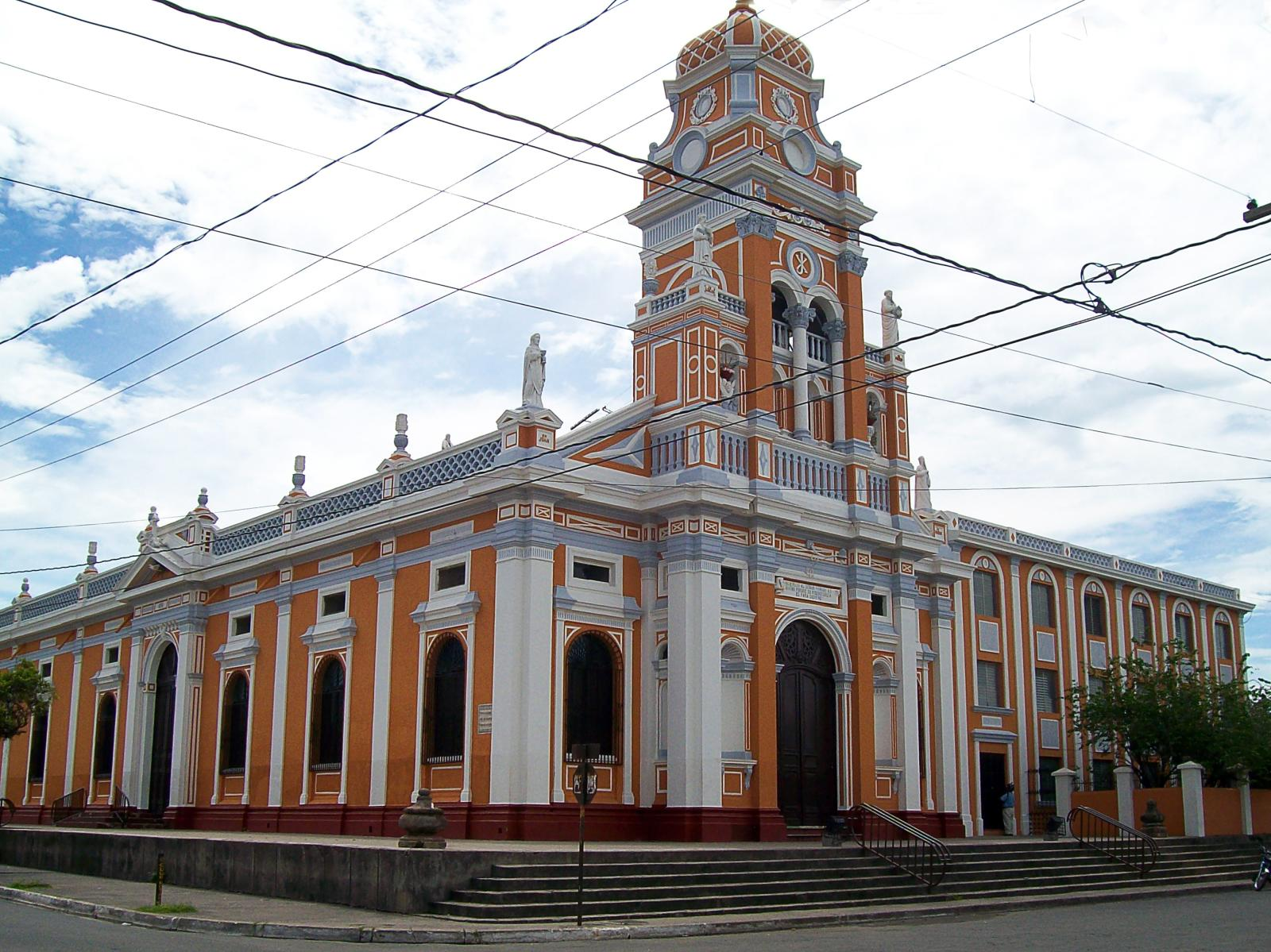
Xalteva Church, it was originally built during colonial times and due to its location it was used as a military fortress. The façade and interior were rebuilt after its destruction by William Walker the filibuster, it was finally rebuilt in 1890–1898.

Granada has long been a center of commerce, including timber, gold and silver. Granada's economy continues to grow as it is becoming a hub for tourism. Though Granada remains Nicaragua's sixth largest city, it is widely known for preserving some of the finest colonial-era architecture in the country.

A real estate boom had been underway for several years, with many European and Americans purchasing and renovating the area's homes for retirement or holiday homes and several foreign realtors establishing offices, but that boom slowed in 2007. The prior escalation of real estate prices in Granada and other parts of Southwestern Nicaragua has led to a shift of investor attention toward Northern Nicaragua and the cities of Matagalpa, Leon, Corinto and the surrounding beaches of Leon and Corinto.

Museums have opened, and new hotels and restaurants are proliferating at a fast rate.

Granada, though now dependent on tourism, also has fertile agricultural land within the municipality. Major production of organic coffee and cacao, cattle, plantains and bananas occurs within its boundaries.

== Gastronomy ==
Granada's culinary sector has received coverage by publications such as The New York Times. The city's restaurant offerings include establishments such as Pita Pita, Garden Café, and La Hacienda. In recent years, the food scene has incorporated a combination of local and international cuisines alongside local agricultural sourcing. Additionally, Granada's economy benefits from tourism driven by its colonial architecture, natural environment, and food culture.

== Infrastructure ==
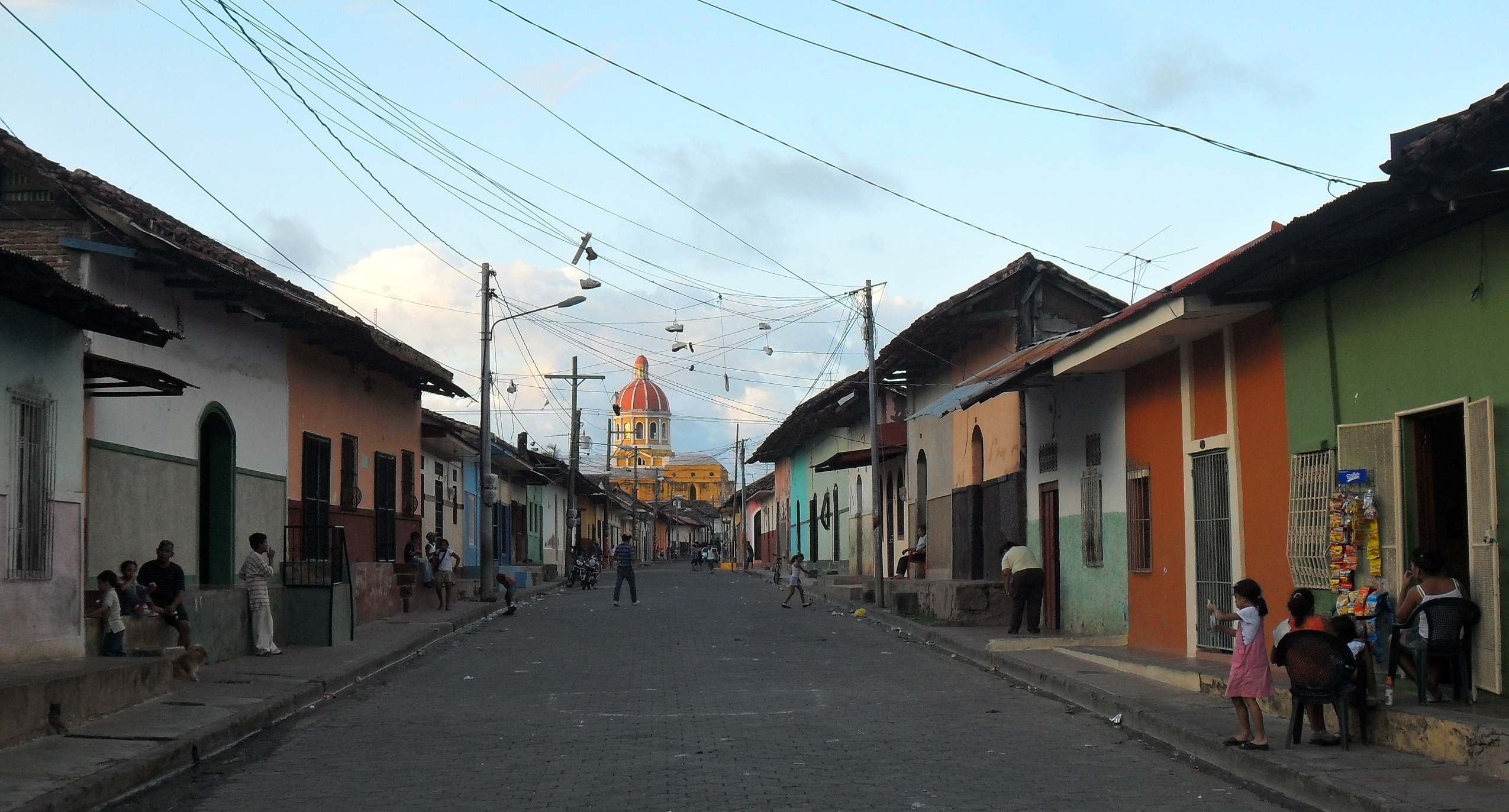
A street of Granada

Most of Granada's streets are narrow, as the city evolved centuries before the advent of motorized vehicles. Therefore, today, many streets allow only one-way traffic, offering a challenge to visitors traveling by car.

Following many years of neglect, primarily due to the economic collapse of the nation in the 1980s, most of Granada's buildings and infrastructure began to deteriorate. Roads and public utilities fell into disrepair.

In the decades that followed, however, the city government directed funds towards recognition and restoration of many of Granada's historic structures. The Spanish government has provided financial cooperation for the refurbishment of the city. One such project is transforming Calle La Calzada into a pedestrian street.

== Relevant historical architecture, streets and attractions ==
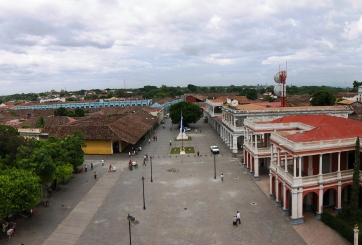
Plaza de la Independencia

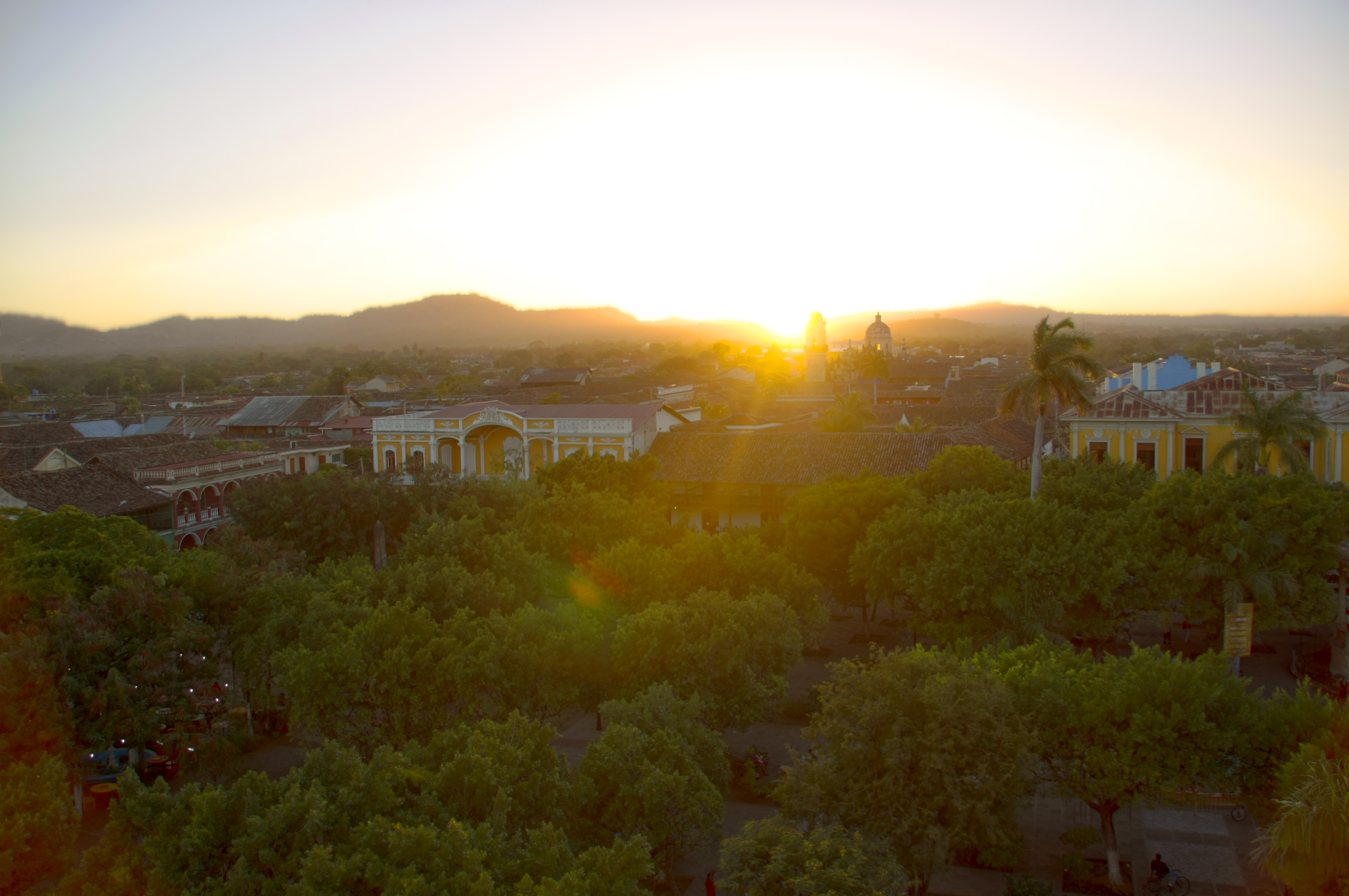
View of Granada and Central Park from the cathedral.

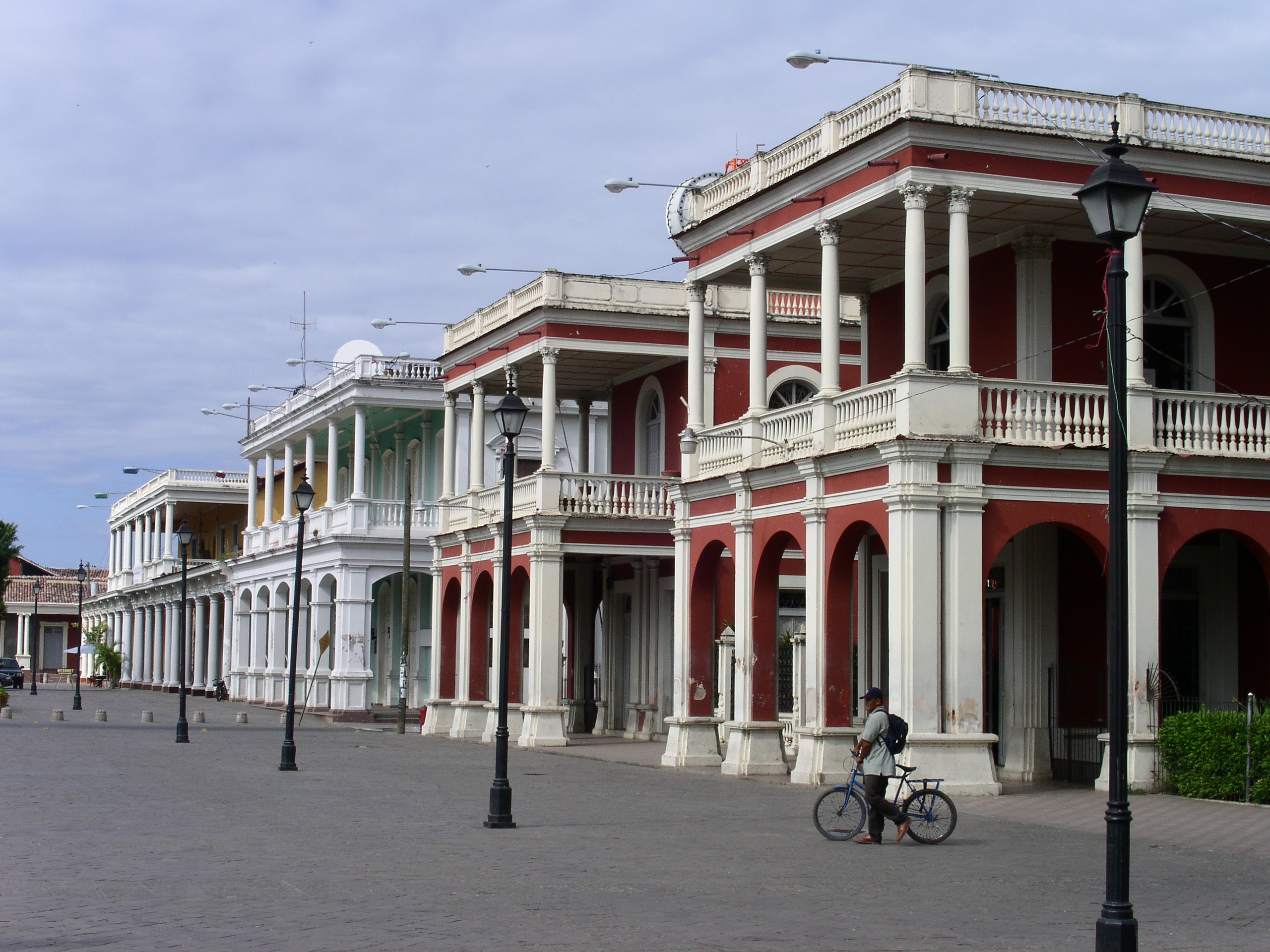
View of Granada Town Square

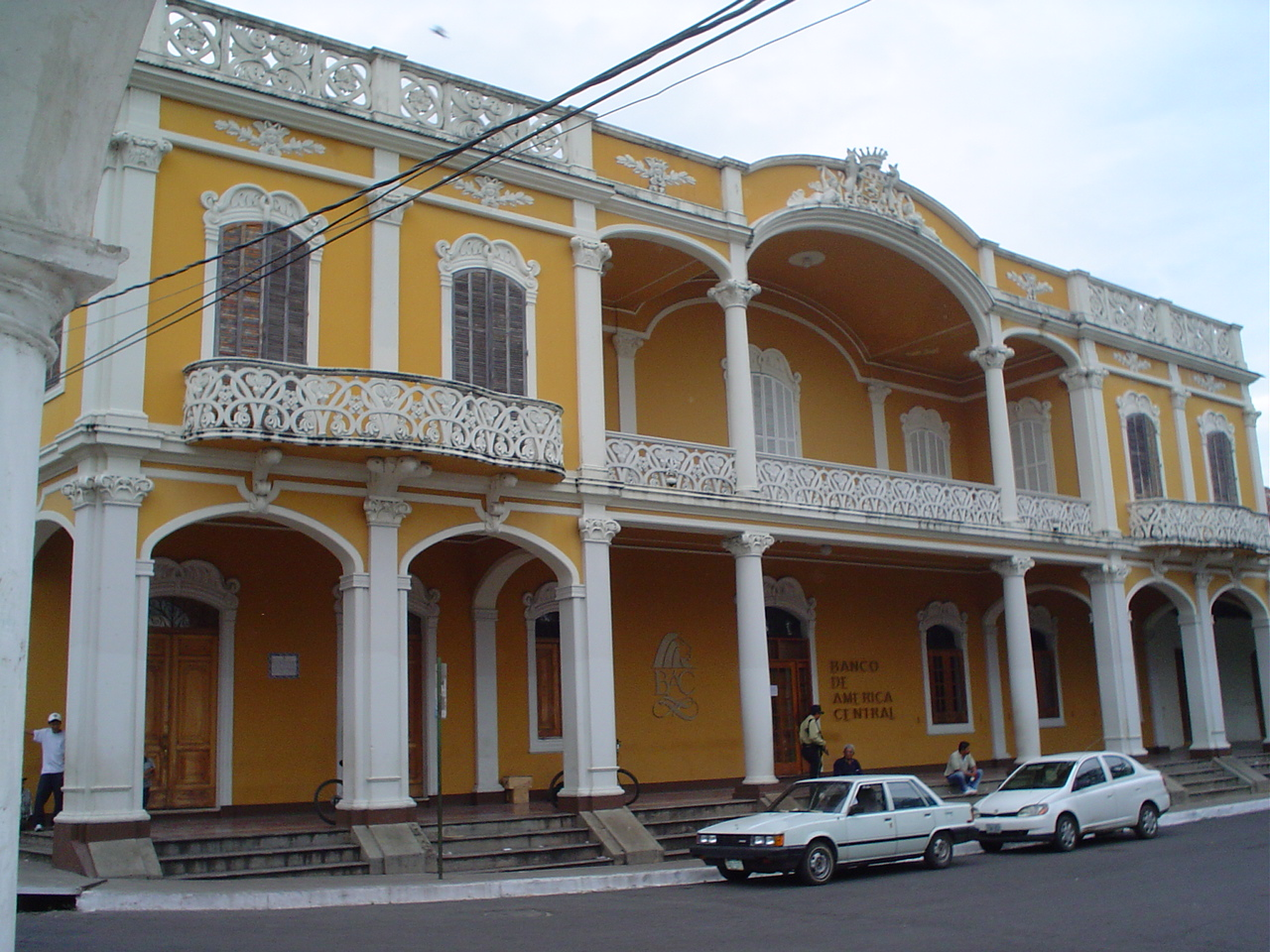
Streets of Granada.

- San Francisco Church and Museum
- Xalteva Church
- Plazuela de los Leones
- Plaza de la Independencia
- Central Park
- Our Lady of the Assumption Cathedral
- Guadalupe Church
- Calle La Calzada
- Calle Atravesada
- La Merced Church
- Fortin de San Pablo
- Fuerte La Pólvora
- Episcopal Palace
- Alcaldía Municipal
- San Antonio College
- Diocesan College
- Old Social Club
- Old Railway Station

== Culture ==
Granada, like most of the Nicaraguan Pacific, is populated primarily by a Spanish-speaking majority of Mestizos. Residing here also are people from the United States, Canada, Spain, Germany, Italy, Ireland, Austria, the Netherlands, and France.

Until recently, Nicaragua was experiencing a booming tourist economy. This, in turn, attracted foreigners to Granada seeking colonial homes for purchase, adding a growing number of Europeans and Americans to the city's population. Real estate prices had increased following the foreign interest and subsequent investments. However, with the 2018 civil conflict, the US Department of State issued a travel advisory, citing "civil unrest, crime, limited healthcare availability, and arbitrary enforcement of laws." In 2020, it issued a Level 4, "Do Not Travel" advisory due to COVID-19. The city is recognized as a "Design City" by UNESCO's Creative Cities Network.

== International relations ==
=== Twin towns – Sister cities ===
Granada is twinned with:

Badajoz, Badajoz, Extremadura, Spain; Santa Ana de Coro, Venezuela; Terrassa, Barcelona, Catalonia, Spain; Frankfurt am Main, Hesse, Germany; Dos Hermanas, Seville, Andalusia, Spain	Cartago, Costa Rica; Antigua Guatemala, Guatemala; Comayagua, Honduras; Santa Tecla, El Salvador
