= Co-presidents of Nicaragua =

Heads of state and government

Co-Presidents of the Republic of Nicaragua
- Copresidentes de la República de Nicaragua
- Coat of arms of Nicaragua

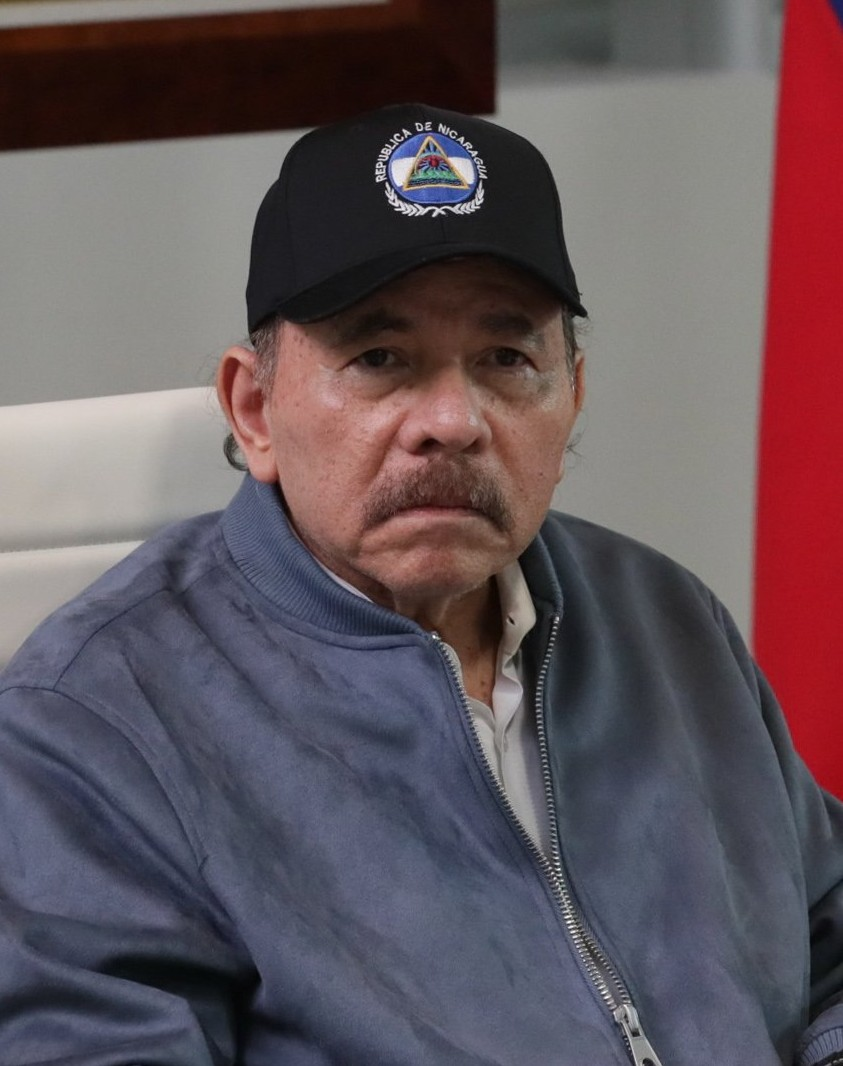
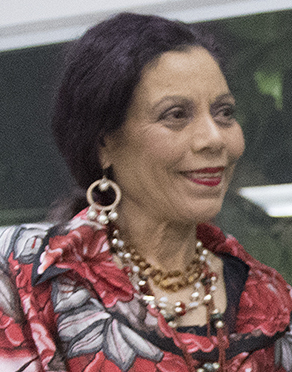
- Incumbent Daniel Ortega Rosario Murillo since 10 January 2007 (Ortega) since 18 February 2025 (Murillo)
- Style: Mr./Madam President (Señor/a Presidente/a) (informal); The Most Excellent (Excelentísimo/a Señor/a) (diplomatic)
- Status: Head of state Head of government
- Residence: Casa Naranja
- Seat: Managua
- Term length: Six years; renewable indefinitely
- Constituting instrument: Constitution of Nicaragua
- Precursor: Supreme Director of Nicaragua
- Formation: 30 April 1854 (172 years ago)
- First holder: Fruto Chamorro
- Deputy: Vice President of Nicaragua
- Salary: C$116,768 / US$3,193 monthly

The co-presidents of Nicaragua (Spanish: co-presidentes de Nicaragua), officially known as the Presidency of the Republic of Nicaragua (Presidencia de la República de Nicaragua), are the dual heads of state and government of Nicaragua. The presidency was first created in the Constitution of 1854. From 1825 until the Constitution of 1839, the head of state of Nicaragua was simply styled as Head of State (Jefe de Estado), and from 1839 to 1854 as Supreme Director (Supremo Director).

In 2025, the Constitution of Nicaragua was amended to allow the powers of the presidency to be exercised by two co-presidents rather than a single person. A male and female co-president are elected by universal suffrage to a six-year term. Upon the amendment adoption, incumbent president Daniel Ortega and his wife and vice-president Rosario Murillo were declared the inaugural co-presidents, making Nicaragua the only country in the world currently ruled by a spousal diarchy. Ortega had previously served as president since 2007.

== Constitutional basis ==
In 2009, the Supreme Court of Nicaragua ruled that the constitutional ban on immediate reelection was unenforceable. In 2014, the National Assembly amended the constitution to allow the President to seek an unlimited number of five-year terms.

In 2025, the assembly extended the presidential term to six years and declared incumbent president Daniel Ortega and his wife, Vice President Rosario Murillo, co-presidents. The revised constitution provides for the powers of the presidency to be exercised by a male and female co-president elected by universal suffrage. Candidates for election must have resided in Nicaragua for at least six years prior to the election, must hold only Nicaraguan nationality, and must not have been declared "traitors to the homeland" (Spanish: traidores a la patria). These eligibility requirements effectively barred leading opposition candidates from standing for election, as they had been exiled and stripped of their citizenship in February 2023.

== See also ==
- History of Nicaragua
- List of years in Nicaragua
