= List of elections in 1947 =

The following elections occurred in the year 1947.

== Africa ==
- Algerian municipal elections
- 1946–1947 Moyen-Congo Representative Council election
- 1946–47 Chadian General Council election
- 1946–47 Dahomeyan General Council election
- 1946–47 French Sudan General Council election
- Gabonese Representative Council election, 1946−47
- Gambian legislative election
- Guinean General Council election, 1946−47
- 1946–47 Ivorian General Council election
- 1946–1947 Moyen-Congo Representative Council election
- Nigerian general election
- Nigerien General Council election, 1946−47

== Asia ==
- 1947 Burmese general election
- Iranian legislative election
- Iraqi parliamentary election
- Japanese general election
- Japanese House of Councillors election
- Laotian parliamentary election
- Lebanese general election
- North Korean local elections
- Pakistani Constituent Assembly election
- Philippine Senate election
- Republic of China National Assembly election
- Soviet Union regional elections
- Syrian parliamentary election
- Transjordanian general election

== Australia ==
- 1947 New South Wales state election
- 1947 Queensland state election
- 1947 South Australian state election
- 1947 Victorian state election
- 1947 Western Australian state election

== Europe ==
- 1947 Hungarian parliamentary election
- 1947 Liechtenstein referendums
- 1947 Italian presidential election
- 1947 Maltese general election
- 1947 Norwegian local elections
- 1947 Soviet Union regional elections
- 1947 Swiss federal election
- 1947 Swiss referendums

=== Denmark ===
- Folketing election
- Landsting election

=== France ===
- presidential election

=== Germany ===
- Rhineland-Palatinate: state election
- Schleswig-Holstein: state election
- Lower Saxony: state election
- North Rhine-Westphalia: state election
- Saarland: state election
- Bremen: state election

=== Hungary ===
- parliamentary election

=== Poland ===
- legislative election
- presidential election

=== United Kingdom ===
- 1947 Edinburgh East by-election
- 1947 Epsom by-election
- 1947 Gravesend by-election
- 1947 Howdenshire by-election
- 1947 Islington West by-election
- 1947 Jarrow by-election
- 1947 Liverpool Edge Hill by-election
- 1947 Normanton by-election

==== United Kingdom local ====
===== English local =====
- 1947 Manchester Council election

== Americas ==
=== North America ===
==== Caribbean ====
- 1947 Dominican Republic general election

==== Canada ====
- 1947 Edmonton municipal election
- 1947 Prince Edward Island general election
- 1947 Toronto municipal election
- 1947 Yukon general election

=== United States ===
==== United States gubernatorial ====
- 1947 Kentucky gubernatorial election
- 1947 Mississippi gubernatorial election
- 1947 United States gubernatorial elections

==== United States House of Representatives ====
- 1947 United States House of Representatives elections

==== United States Senate ====
- 1947 United States Senate elections
- 1947 United States Senate special election in Mississippi

==== United States mayoral elections ====
- 1947 Baltimore mayoral election
- 1947 Chicago mayoral election
- 1947 Cleveland mayoral election
- 1947 Evansville mayoral election
- 1947 Indianapolis mayoral election
- 1947 Manchester mayoral election
- 1947 Philadelphia mayoral election
- 1947 San Diego mayoral election
- 1947 San Francisco mayoral election
- 1947 Springfield mayoral election

=== Central and South America ===
- Bolivian general election
- Brazilian legislative election
- Colombian parliamentary election
- Ecuadorian parliamentary election
- 1947 Guatemalan parliamentary election
- Nicaragua:
  - Constitutional Assembly election
  - general election
  - presidential election
- Venezuelan general election

== See also ==
- Category:1947 elections
