= 1947 Nicaraguan Constitutional Assembly election =

Constitutional Assembly elections were held in Nicaragua on 3 August 1947.

On the night of 25–26 May 1947 Somoza woke the President Argüello in his bed and told him that he was no longer president of Nicaragua. Somoza forced the National Congress of Nicaragua to convene at 3 am and declare the now ex-president mentally incompetent. At the insistence of the diplomatic corps Argüello was not imprisoned but exiled to Mexico where he died in December that year. Benjamín Lacayo Sacasa was Somoza’s next choice for president, but even the new US administration led by Harry Truman found it impossible to recognize such a blatant corruption of the political process.

President Sacasa announced on 10 June that a Constituent Assembly would convene on 29 August, following the election of delegates on 3 August. The edict also granted juridical status to the Conservative party, and unnamed antidemocratic parties were outlawed. The assembly was charged with writing a new Constitution, electing a new President and Congress, and reorganizing the judiciary. At the same time the government was attempting to establish its legal basis, it suppressed civil liberties.

A decree of 5 July 1947, signed by Provisional President Lacayo, sent the main leaders of the Socialist Party off to internal exile on the island of Ometepe in Lake Nicaragua. They were not accused of doing anything illegal except belonging to a political group that espoused a foreign ideology prohibited by the Constitution.

Amid widespread apathy, elections for the Constituent Assembly were held, as scheduled on 3 August. Only Somoza's Nationalist Liberal Party ticket offered candidates. All other groups abstained. Reports from throughout the country indicated that voting was restricted to government workers and ‘poorly clad peons. “The results appear to have been so meager that the official tallies were not even published in ‘La Gaceta/Diario Oficial’”.

== Results ==
Party	Seats
Nationalist Liberal Party	38
Conservative Nationalist Party	8
Traditional Conservative Party	3
Total	49
Source: Political Handbook of the World

== Bibliography ==
- Alexander, Robert J. Communism in Latin America. New Brunswick: Rutgers University Press. 1957.
- Elections in the Americas A Data Handbook Volume 1. North America, Central America, and the Caribbean. Edited by Dieter Nohlen. 2005.
- Leonard, Thomas M. The United States and Central America, 1944–1949. Tuscaloosa: The University of Alabama Press. 1984.
- Merrill, Tim L., ed. Nicaragua : a country study. Washington: Federal Research Division, Library of Congress. 1994.
- Political handbook of the world 1948. New York, 1949.
- Rojas Bolaños, Manuel. “La política.” Historia general de Centroamérica. 1994. San José: FLACSO. Volume five, 1994.
- Smith, Hazel. Nicaragua: self-determination and survival. London : Pluto Press. 1993.
- Walter, Knut. The regime of Anastasio Somoza, 1936–1956. Chapel Hill: The University of North Carolina. 1993.
