= 1947 Nicaraguan general election =

- 2 February 1947
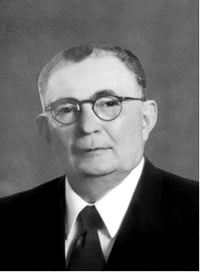
Nominee	Leonardo Argüello Barreto	Enoc Aguado
Party	Nationalist Liberal Party	Conservative Nationalist Party
Popular vote	104,804	64,904
Percentage	61.76	38.24
President before election
Anastasio Somoza García
Nationalist Liberal Party
Elected President
Leonardo Argüello Barreto
Nationalist Liberal Party

General elections were held in Nicaragua on 2 February 1947 to elect a president and National Congress.

The agreement between the Conservatives and the Independent Liberal Party (PLI), signed on 17 August, pledged both parties to overthrow the dictatorship, guarantee civil liberties, initiate governmental and constitutional reforms, and establish a government that would provide minority representation. Subsequently, the PLI met in a convention in León and ratified the choice of an elderly Liberal, Dr. Enoc Aguado, as the presidential candidate of the two parties. However, as the PLI was not legally recognised, Aguado ran as a candidate of the Conservative Nationalist Party.

The Nationalist Liberal Party convention, in early August, remained deadlocked between Lorenzo Guerrero and Alejandro Abaunza. Somoza "engineered another master stroke by arranging the nomination of seventy-one-year-old Leonardo Argüello Barreto, who combined the dual advantages of a 'big name' Liberal likely to attract support from the Independent Liberals. His malleability, lack of vigor, and reported feeble health made Somoza's indirect 'continuismo' probable."

The Communists made the most of the opportunity to function without government interference. By December, 1946, they claimed 1500 members and the support of 25 percent of the electorate. Since Somoza relied considerably on the Nicaraguan Socialist Party for support, the Communists began to press him for influence within the government. They wanted government jobs, and even put in a bid for seats in Congress. However, Somoza resisted this pressure. At the same time the opposition, which was preparing for the elections of 1947, also sought the Communists' support. It offered to name six Communists on its ticket for members of the Chamber of Deputies. In the end the Communists threw their support to the opposition candidate, Enoc Aguado.

The 23 February elections were free of violence, but not government-inspired fraud, which enabled Leonardo Argüello Barreto to win by 39,900 votes. The official count also gave the Nationalist Liberal Party control of the legislature and judiciary. Leonardo Argüello Barreto took office on 1 May.

"Once in office, Leonardo Argüello Barreto proceeded to effect changes in personnel, moves that sought to undermine Somoza's hold on the bureaucracy and the Guardia Nacional. Argüello also wanted to demilitarize those public services that Somoza had put under Guardia control during the war years, such as the public health service, the customs, the communications network, and the railroad itself. The breaking point between the two men came when the Congress, firmly under Somoza's control, proceeded to appoint the three 'designados a la presidencia,' who would be directly in line to replace the president should he leave office. Needless to say, the three so named were Somocistas. On 25 May, Argüello informed Somoza that he was to leave the country and that his resignation as Jefe Director would be announced immediately afterward. Somoza apparently agreed to go but asked for a few days to arrange his affairs. That was more than enough time for him to organize the overthrow of Argüello, which came in the early morning hours of the following day. Argüello refused to resign as president but finally agreed to go to the Mexican embassy as an exile."

== Results ==
Party	Candidate	Votes	%
Nationalist Liberal Party	Leonardo Argüello Barreto	96,731	57.00
Conservative Nationalist Party	Leonardo Argüello Barreto	8,073	4.76
Conservative Nationalist Party	Enoc Aguado	64,904	38.24
Total		169,708	100.00
Source: Nohlen

== Bibliography ==
- Alexander, Robert J. Communism in Latin America. New Brunswick: Rutgers University Press. 1957.
- Cole Chamorro, Alejandro. 145 años de historia política. Managua. 1967.
- Elections in the Americas A Data Handbook Volume 1. North America, Central America, and the Caribbean. Edited by Dieter Nohlen. 2005.
- Leonard, Thomas M. The United States and Central America, 1944–1949. Tuscaloosa: The University of Alabama Press. 1984.
- Merrill, Tim L., ed. Nicaragua : a country study. Washington: Federal Research Division, Library of Congress. 1994.
- Political handbook of the world 1948. New York, 1949.
- Rojas Bolaños, Manuel. “La política.” Historia general de Centroamérica. 1994. San José: FLACSO. Volume five, 1994.
- Smith, Hazel. Nicaragua: self-determination and survival. London : Pluto Press. 1993.
- Walter, Knut. The regime of Anastasio Somoza, 1936–1956. Chapel Hill: The University of North Carolina. 1993.
