= Term limits in Nicaragua =

Term limits have been used in Nicaragua since its first constitution was introduced in 1826. The president of Nicaragua has been intermittently subject to term limits, which have been abolished and restored numerous times as the constitution was changed and power was seized through coups. Term limits were most recently implemented with a 1995 constitutional amendment and abolished by a court decision in 2009 followed by a constitutional amendment in 2014.

== Presidential term limits ==
Between Nicaragua's first constitution in 1826 and the abolition of term limits under Daniel Ortega in 2014, the government implemented term limits eleven times. In that time, they have frequently been subverted, abolished, or ignored.

=== Early history ===
Term limits were introduced in Nicaragua's original 1826 constitution, while it was a territory of the Federal Republic of Central America. It allowed presidential terms of four years, which were limited by a ban on consecutive terms. It was succeeded by the 1838 constitution, which established two-year terms with a ban on consecutive terms. This was a period plagued by violent partisanship and attempts to extend one's hold on political power, known as continuismo, and the dictator seizing control often changed the constitution to consolidate his power.

=== Conservative and liberal governments ===
Nicaragua's 1858 constitution returned to four-year terms with a ban on consecutive terms. The nation had been in a state of civil war since independence, and term limits were one of several measures established by the Conservative Party to limit executive power and avoid the return of the caudillo dictators that brought instability to Nicaragua. They had mixed results as presidents ignored the constitution. Term limits were tested in the 1892 presidential election when incumbent president Roberto Sacasa was elected. He had ascended to the presidency through the order of succession, which his supporters said did not count as a presidential term and he was therefore not subject to the limit on consecutive terms.

The 1858 constitution lasted until the end of conservative rule in 1893 when José Santos Zelaya overthrew Sacasa's government. A new constitution was implemented by Zelaya and the liberals in 1893, which retained the four year terms and the ban on consecutive terms. The constitution was abolished in 1896, and Zelaya remained in power until he was overthrown by the conservatives in 1909 and a new conservative government was established.

The second conservative government implemented a new constitution in 1912. It restored four-year terms and the ban on consecutive terms. Presidential elections were complicated by the political environment of the time, which included a new period of civil war, occupation by the United States, electoral fraud, a coup, had a presidency controlled by the Conservative Party which transferred power within its own membership. Despite this, term limits remained in force, and the 1928 election ended with the country's first peaceful transition of power between opposing political parties.

=== Somoza government ===
The 1912 constitution remained in force until 1936 when the government was overthrown by Anastasio Somoza García and the dictatorship of the Somoza family began. While the constitution and its term limits were still in effect legally, they were ignored by Somoza until the creation of his own constitution in 1939.

The 1939 constitution was established during the Somoza family's rule, allowing six-year terms with a ban on consecutive terms. Although the elections under Somoza rule were not free and fair, they retained term limits to maintain a pretense of democracy and pluralism. On three occasions—in 1947, 1963, and 1972—members of the Somoza family were term limited and stood down to be succeeded by another member of the Nationalist Liberal Party. Luis Somoza Debayle referred to the shuffling of placeholder presidents as "changing the monkey".

Somoza's 1939 constitution allowed the Constitutional Assembly to select the first nominee in 1947. Leonardo Argüello Barreto was chosen, only to be overthrown 24 days later because he did not support Somoza. The 1939 constitution was abolished that year, but the 1948 constitution kept the same rules for presidential terms, as did the subsequent constitution of 1950. The 1962 constitution reduced the six-year term to four years.

Somoza's son Luis Somoza gave up the presidency in 1963 so the family did not have to exercise control actively through public office, and he was succeeded by other members of the Nationalist Liberal Party before Anastasio Somoza Debayle became president in 1967. The terms were increased to five years in 1966. An interim constitution was implemented in 1971 that created a three-person council to succeed Anastasio Somoza in 1972, and terms were raised back to six years. The 1974 constitution restored the presidency and retained the six-year terms with a ban on consecutive terms.

=== Sandinista government and democratic rule ===
The Sandinista National Liberation Front overthrew the Somoza government in 1979 and abolished the presidency in favor of collective leadership. Democracy was restored in 1984, though the Sandinistas remained in power until 1990. A constitution was established in 1987, but it did not include term limits. Nicaragua was one of only two Latin American democracies, along with Paraguay, not to have term limits in the 1980s amid the third wave of democracy.

The 1987 constitution was amended in 1995 to establish term limits. Although it was opposed by incumbent liberal president Violeta Chamorro and her predecessor, Daniel Ortega of the Sandinistas, it was supported by a multi-party coalition in the legislature. The amendment set a maximum of two five-year terms, which could not be consecutive. It also disallowed the election of a vice president who had ascended to the presidency at least one year prior to the election. Incumbent president Arnoldo Alemán wished to abolish term limits in the El Pacto agreement he negotiated with Ortega, but Ortega insisted on keeping them.

=== Abolition of term limits under Daniel Ortega ===
Ortega returned to the presidency in 2007 and pushed to abolish term limits, but the Sandinisatas did not have the necessary supermajority in the legislature to amend the constitution. In 2009, Ortega brought a case before the Supreme Electoral Council requesting he be allowed to run for a consecutive term in the 2011 election, arguing that term limits violated the right to public participation for him and those wishing to vote for him, but the council ruled against him.

After Ortega's case was denied by the Supreme Electoral Council, he brought it before the Constitutional Chamber of the Supreme Court. It was heard by magistrates loyal to the Sandinistas, and they ruled in Ortega's favor, allowing him to ignore the limit on consecutive terms. It found that term limits restricted the right to public participation guaranteed by the constitution, as well as Nicaragua's commitments to international human rights treaties like the American Convention on Human Rights. It went beyond Ortega's original request of eligibility for the 2011 election, ruling that all electoral limitations besides age and criminal history are unconstitutional. This was the first time in Nicaragua that power was seized peacefully by an incumbent who had been elected in a free and fair election.

Term limits were formally abolished under Ortega's presidency with a constitutional amendment in 2014. This followed a pattern in Latin America ongoing at the time, where six governments subverted term limits while three more unsuccessfully attempted to do so.

The Inter-American Commission on Human Rights issued a statement in 2021 that the American Convention on Human Rights did not forbid term limits as Nicaragua and other governments had argued, but that abolishing term limits is "contrary to the principles of a representative democracy". It issued a binding ruling in 2024 that Nicaragua had violated the rights of Ortega's 2011 opponent, Fabio Gadea Mantilla, by abolishing term limits and it must restore them to comply with the American Convention on Human Rights. The Nicaraguan government ignored the ruling.

An amendment in 2025 increased the president's four-year terms to six years and created a co-presidency system with Ortega and his wife Rosario Murillo.
