= Traditional Conservative Party =

The Traditional Conservative Party (Spanish: Partido Conservador Tradicionalista, PCT), was a Nicaraguan political party founded in the first half of the 19th century as the Conservative Party.

== History ==
In 1950, Emiliano Chamorro, leader of the PCT and Anastasio Somoza García, leader of the liberals, signed the Pacto de los Generales, thus laying the basis for a new political coalition. This agreement ensured a victory for Somoza in the 1950 elections and preserved the division of legislative seats between the majority and minority parties in the elections with the losing party always guaranteed one-third of the seats.

The PCT broke up with Somoza in 1956 and joined the Independent Liberal Party, and the National Renovation Party to form an opposition movement called the Defensive Front of the Republic (FDR), in order to frustrate Anastasio Somoza’s plan to be reelected president in 1957.

Evidence of massive impending fraud caused the Traditional Conservative Party to abandon its loyalist stance of the previous decade and to boycott the 1963 elections, thereby raising the party's credibility among the public at large.

A few years later, the PCT became part of the National Opposition Union under the leadership of Fernando Agüero.
