= 1936 Nicaraguan general election =

- 8 December 1936
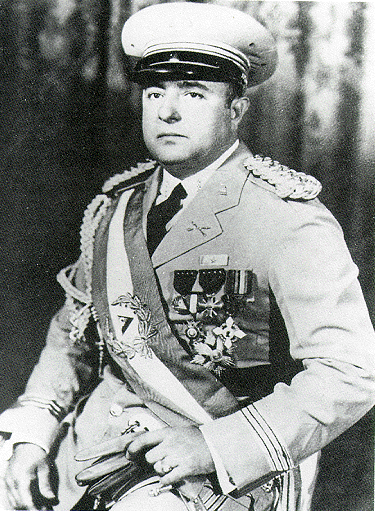
Nominee	Anastasio Somoza García	Leonardo Argüello Barreto
Party	Nationalist Liberal Party–Conservative Nationalist Party	Conservative Party – Constitutional Liberal Party
Popular vote	64,000	16,663
Percentage	79.34	20.66
President before election
Carlos Alberto Brenes Jarquín
Nationalist Liberal Party
Elected President
Anastasio Somoza García
Nationalist Liberal Party

General elections were held in Nicaragua on 8 December 1936 to elect a President, half of the Deputies and one-third of the Senators of the National Congress.

On 16 June the Liberal party met in León to hold its convention and name its candidate for the presidency. The nomination of Anastasio Somoza García was totally uneventful. "The old party leadership was swept aside in favor of a new group of younger, more dynamic and ambitious men."

Ex-President Emiliano Chamorro Vargas left for Costa Rica on 23 June 1936 claiming that his life was in danger. After Chamorro's departure from the country, the Conservatives were divided as to what to do in the coming elections. One faction, headed by Chamorro, decided to carry on with the candidacy of Leonardo Argüello Barreto according to the Liberal-Conservative pact signed just before Juan Bautista Sacasa was removed from office. A dissident faction of anti-Somoza Liberals formed the Constitutionalist Liberal Party, which joined up with the Chamorrista Conservatives to support Argüello and Espinoza as his vice-presidential candidate. Somoza's response was to promote the formation of a rival Conservative party that would support his candidacy. Somoza's Conservatives organized the so-called Conservative Nationalist Party.

In November Somoza resigned as Jefe Director of the National Guard so that his ascent to power could remain within the constitution.

In November Conservative and Liberal committees supporting the bi-partisan agreement met and decided to abstain from voting on 8 December. Their decision had the practical result of withdrawing the Argüello-Espinosa ticket.

"Although he ran in the 1936 elections without any significant opposition, Somoza built an electoral coalition that included urban businessmen, some urban and rural laborers, rightist middle-class groups, and some ex-Conservatives. In the years to come, Somoza would maintain this coalition through an extensive patronage network that allowed him to govern without having to rely on the day-to-day coercion found in Central America’s military-authoritarian regimes."

== Results ==
Party	Candidate	Votes	%
Nationalist Liberal Party–Conservative Nationalist Party	Anastasio Somoza García	64,000	79.34
Conservative Party–Constitutional Liberal Party	Leonardo Argüello Barreto	16,663	20.66
Total		80,663	100.00
Source: Nohlen

== Bibliography ==
- Alexander, Robert J. Latin American political parties. New York: Praeger Publishers. 1973.
- Bulmer-Thomas, Victor. “ Nicaragua since 1930.” Central America since independence. 1991. Cambridge: Cambridge University Press.
- Cardenal Tellería, Marco A. Nicaragua y su historia: cronología del acontecer histórico y construcción de la nación nicaragüense. Managua: Banco Mercantíl. Volume I. 2000.
- Cole Chamorro, Alejandro. 145 años de historia política. Managua. 1967.
- Elections in the Americas A Data Handbook Volume 1. North America, Central America, and the Caribbean. Edited by Dieter Nohlen. 2005.
- Leonard, Thomas M. The United States and Central America, 1944–1949. Tuscaloosa: The University of Alabama Press. 1984.
- MacRenato, Ternot. Somoza: seizure of power, 1926–1939. La Jolla: University of California, San Diego. 1991.
- Mahoney, James. The legacies of liberalism: path dependence and political regimes in Central America. Baltimore: The Johns Hopkins University Press. 2001.
- Merrill, Tim L., ed. Nicaragua : a country study. Washington: Federal Research Division, Library of Congress. 1994.
- Millett, Richard. Guardians of the dynasty: a history of the U.S. created Guardia Nacional de Nicaragua and the Somoza Family. Maryknoll: Orbis Books. 1977.
- Political handbook of the world 1937. New York, 1938.
- Rojas Bolaños, Manuel. “La política.” Historia general de Centroamérica. 1994. San José: FLACSO. Volume five, 1994.
- Smith, Hazel. Nicaragua: self-determination and survival. London : Pluto Press. 1993.
- Stahler-Sholk, Richard. “Building democracy in Nicaragua.” Liberalization and redemocratization in Latin America. 1987. Westport: Greenwood Press. 1987.
- Walter, Knut. The regime of Anastasio Somoza, 1936–1956. Chapel Hill: The University of North Carolina. 1993.
