= 1947 Nicaraguan presidential election =

Presidential elections were held in Nicaragua on 15 August 1947.

On 15 August, a Constituent Assembly appointed Dr. Víctor Manuel Román y Reyes, uncle of General Somoza’s wife, as provisional president and Mariano Argüello Vargas, another loyal ‘Somocista,’ as vice-president. Despite the sham election and the new administration's ‘continuismo’ character, Somoza believed that the government now had legal status and was worthy of recognition. Immediately after taking office, President Víctor Manuel Román y Reyes was rebuffed in his efforts to conciliate differences with the opposition. Although both the Independent Liberals and Conservatives continued their intraparty friction, both remained committed to the restoration of Leonardo Argüello Barreto as president.

== Bibliography ==
- Elections in the Americas A Data Handbook Volume 1. North America, Central America, and the Caribbean. Edited by Dieter Nohlen. 2005.
- Leonard, Thomas M. The United States and Central America, 1944–1949. Tuscaloosa: The University of Alabama Press. 1984.
- MacRenato, Ternot. 1991. Somoza: seizure of power, 1926–1939. La Jolla: University of California, San Diego.
- Political handbook of the world 1948. New York, 1949.
- Rojas Bolaños, Manuel. “La política.” Historia general de Centroamérica. 1994. San José: FLACSO. Volume five, 1994.
- Smith, Hazel. Nicaragua: self-determination and survival. London : Pluto Press. 1993.
- Walter, Knut. The regime of Anastasio Somoza, 1936–1956. Chapel Hill: The University of North Carolina. 1993.
