= Nicaraguan Socialist Youth =

The Nicaraguan Socialist Youth (Spanish: Juventud Socialista Nicaragüense, abbreviated JSN) was a youth organization in Nicaragua during the Cold War years. It was the youth wing of the Nicaraguan Socialist Party (PSN), and took part in the struggles against the Somoza regime.

== History ==
The Nicaraguan Socialist Youth had its roots in the Nicaraguan Patriotic Youth (JPN). The JPN was a short-lived organization existing between 1959 and 1960, that had quickly spread its influence across the country. After the end of JPN, the Nicaraguan Socialist Party (PSN) began organizing the nuclei of their new youth organization all over Nicaragua from late 1960. The JSN was constituted on November 5-6, 1961. The founding leaders of JSN were Jorge Alberto Navarro and Francisco Buitrago. The new organization came into being in the midst of political tensions over political line between 1961 and 1963 - and various young socialists supporting an armed struggle line like Noel Guerrero, Carlos Fonseca Amador, Tomás Borge, Silvio Mayorga and others broke with PSN and eventually founded the rival National Liberation Front (FLN, later re-named the Sandinista National Liberation Front). By early 1963 most of the JSN cadres had sided with FLN, including the founding leaders Navarro and Buitrago.

Emerging from the split, JSN strove to unite democratic and progressive youth forces into a single, broad national democratic front. The primary activity of JSN was setting up and organizing political circles among peasant and working youth. JSN formed activist brigades to organize agricultural trade unions and peasant leagues. JSN was active in the students movement and different mass fronts among students, such as the Revolutionary Student Front (FER). JSN joined the National Opposition Union in 1966, seeking to oust Somoza family in the 1967 election. JSN was a member of the World Federation of Democratic Youth (WFDY).

JSN surged in influence in the first half of the 1970s in departments such as Carazo, Chinandega, Chontales, Matagalpa, Río San Juan and Rivas, in a period when their mother party led various strike movements and forged anti-Somoza alliances. JSN emerged as the second-strongest political force at universities between 1971 and 1974. JSN also built movements among secondary school students. After the PSN opted to join the armed struggle, the JSN participated in setting up the Military Organization of the People (OMP). On July 17, 1978 JSN was one of the founding organizations of the United People Movement (MPU), as a united front against the Somoza regime.
