= 1957 Nicaraguan general election =

- 3 February 1957
Nominee	Luis Somoza Debayle	Edmundo Amador Pineda
Party	Nationalist Liberal Party	Conservative Nationalist Party
Popular vote	316,998	38,180
Percentage	89.25	10.75
President before election
Anastasio Somoza García
Nationalist Liberal Party
Elected President
Luis Somoza Debayle
Nationalist Liberal Party

General elections were held in Nicaragua on 3 February 1957 to elect a president and National Congress.

Luis Somoza Debayle formalized his grip on the presidency through fraudulent elections in February 1957 which were boycotted by all the opposition except the puppet Conservative Nationalist Party (PNC). The Popular Social Christian Party (PPSC) was created in reaction to these elections and received support from younger Conservatives dissatisfied with their party’s inability to make any political impact on the dictatorship.

== Results ==
Party	Candidate	Votes	%	Seats	
Party	Candidate	Votes	%	Chamber	Senate
Nationalist Liberal Party	Luis Somoza Debayle	316,998	89.25	28	12
Conservative Nationalist Party	Edmundo Amador Pineda	38,180	10.75	14	4
Special seats (Note: Two former presidents as life members and the defeated presidential candidate. All were members of the Conservative Party.)				0	3
Total		355,178	100.00	42	19
Source: Nohlen
