= Gustavo Raskosky =

Former Nicaraguan politician and Vice President

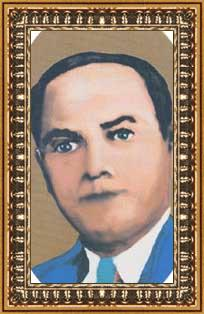

Vice President of Nicaragua
- In office 1 May 1963 – 1 May 1967 Serving with Silvio Argüello Cardenal; Lorenzo Guerrero Gutiérrez
- President: René Schick; Lorenzo Guerrero Gutiérrez
- Preceded by: Mariano Argüello Vargas
- Succeeded by: Francisco Urcuyo Maliaños; Alfonso Callejas Deshón

Personal details
- Born: 24 November 1913 Managua, Nicaragua
- Died: 6 December 1982 (aged 69) Managua, Nicaragua
- Party: Nationalist Liberal Party

Gustavo Raskosky Páez (24 November 1913 – 6 December 1982) was a Nicaraguan politician and former Vice President.

He was elected Mayor of Managua in 1954 and was replaced in 1961. During his administration the National Urbanism Office was created to regulate and control the urban growth of Managua.

He served as Vice President of Nicaragua from May 1963 to May 1967

He died on 6 December 1982, at the age of 69.
