= René Schick =

31st President of Nicaragua from 1963 to 1966

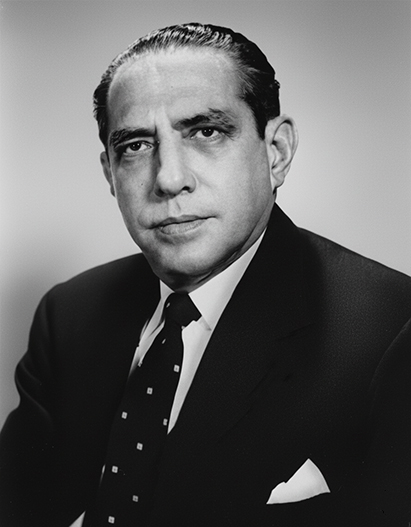
- Schick in 1966

31st President of Nicaragua
- In office 1 May 1963 – 3 August 1966
- Vice President: First Vice President; Lorenzo Guerrero Gutiérrez; Second Vice President; Silvio Argüello Cardenal; Third Vice President; Gustavo Raskosky
- Leader: Luis Somoza Debayle
- Preceded by: Luis Somoza Debayle
- Succeeded by: Orlando Montenegro Medrano (acting); Lorenzo Guerrero Gutiérrez

Minister of Foreign Affairs
- In office 1961–1962
- President: Luis Somoza Debayle
- Preceded by: Alejandro Montiel Argüello
- Succeeded by: Alfonso Ortega Urbina

Minister of Education
- In office 1957–1962
- President: Luis Somoza Debayle

Personal details
- Born: 23 November 1909 León, Nicaragua
- Died: 3 August 1966 (aged 56) Managua, Nicaragua
- Cause of death: Acute Myocardial Infarction
- Party: PLN
- Spouse: Carmen Reñazco
- Parents: Federico Schick Kenguer (Father); Angélica Gutiérrez (Mother)
- Occupation: Politician, Diplomat
- Profession: Lawyer

René Schick Gutiérrez (23 November 1909 – 3 August 1966) was a Nicaraguan politician, lawyer, and diplomat who served as the President of Nicaragua from 1963 until his death in 1966. He was previously the Minister of Foreign Affairs under President Luis Somoza Debayle from 1961 to 1962 and as well as the Minister of Education from 1957 to 1962.

== Biography ==
Schick was born in León. Of Austrian ancestry, Schick's father died in 1911, leaving his family in a precarious economic situation; during his childhood, Schick had to work as a shoeshiner. During his secondary studies at the Instituto Nacional de Occidente in León, Schick's good results caught the attention of the school's director, J. Ramón Sevilla, who secured him employment at the school. After Sevilla was named Minister of Education under President Anastasio Somoza García in 1937, Schick was employed as a civil servant in the government. After completing law studies at the National University of Nicaragua in Managua and working as a professor there, he worked as a lawyer from the early 1940's. Schick entered diplomatic service in 1946, as charge d'affaires at the Embassy of Nicaragua in Washington, D.C. He would go on to serve as Nicaragua's Ambassador to the OAS, the UN and Venezuela.

=== Political career ===
Schick's political career began in 1957, when he was named Minister of Education under Luis Somoza Debayle. In 1961 he was named Minister of Foreign Affairs, and served in this position until 1962, when he resigned to run as presidential candidate for the Nationalist Liberal Party in the 1963 general election. A close associate of the ruling Somoza family, Schick won the election by a wide margin, and was installed as the country's president on 1 May 1963.

As President, Schick continued the staunch anti-communist policies of his predecessor Luis Somoza Debayle, whom he appointed as head of the National Guard. Still, certain pressures on the opposition were eased. In foreign policy, he was a staunch supporter of United States intervention in the Americas. He accused Cuba of being behind the guerrilla activities that started taking place in Nicaragua during the 1960's, and described Fidel Castro as a serious threat to the security of the Western world in a speech before the UN, leading to a further deterioration of the already strained relations between the two countries. In 1964, the Panama Flag Crisis led the United States to reconsider constructing a new canal on Nicaraguan territory; Schick, as a compensation, signed an alliance with the United States, according to which the installation in Nicaragua of missiles aimed at Cuba was allowed. He visited the United States in June 1966, meeting with President, Lyndon B. Johnson on June 9.

In domestic policies, Schick's main objective was the stabilization of Nicaragua's economy. He allowed his country to enter the Central American Common Market, and had agrarian reforms approved in Congress. In March 1966, he proposed a reform of the Constitution, which would increase the duration of the presidential term from four to five years, reduce the number of vice presidents from three to two, and allow freedom of religion.

Schick died in office from a heart attack on 3 August 1966, at the age of 56. He was succeeded by Lorenzo Guerrero, a relative of Schick, who had served as one of his vice presidents.

Political offices
| Preceded by Luis Somoza | President of Nicaragua; 1963–1966 | Succeeded by Orlando Montenegro |
