= 1950 Nicaraguan general election =

- 21 May 1950
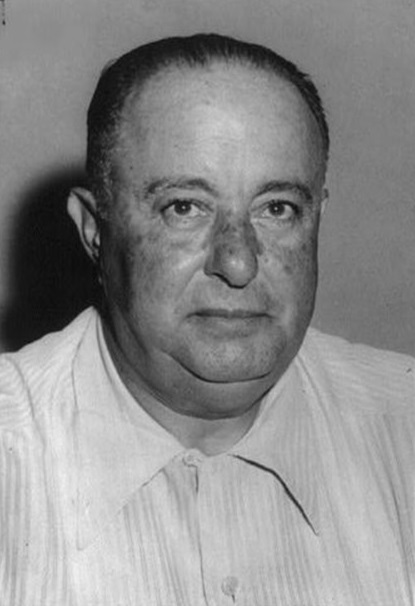
Nominee	Anastasio Somoza García	Emiliano Chamorro Benard
Party	Nationalist Liberal Party	Conservative Party
Popular vote	153,297	49,401
Percentage	75.63	24.37
President before election
Víctor Manuel Román y Reyes
Nationalist Liberal Party
Elected President
Anastasio Somoza García
Nationalist Liberal Party

General elections were held in Nicaragua to elect a president and National Congress of Nicaragua on 21 May 1950.

In April, Anastasio Somoza García and Emiliano Chamorro Vargas sat down and signed the Pacto de los Generales, thus laying the basis for a new political coalition. Once the agreement was signed, the Congress formally proceeded to set the date and the procedure of the upcoming election. Sixty deputies to a Constituent Assembly would be elected, with forty seats going to the majority party and seventeen to the minority party, plus three that would include the defeated presidential candidate and the two living, popularly elected ex-presidents (Anastasio Somoza García and Emiliano Chamorro Vargas). "Only the Liberals and the Conservatives could participate because the constitutional procedure for registering new parties would be held in abeyance."

The Conservative leadership at no time threatened to withdraw from the race and the election was held as scheduled on 21 May. The results of the election proved a disaster for the Conservatives, who received less than one-quarter of all the votes and won a bare outright majority only in Granada.

== Results ==
Party	Candidate	Votes	%	Seats	
Party	Candidate	Votes	%	Chamber	Senate
Nationalist Liberal Party	Anastasio Somoza García	153,297	75.63	28	12
Conservative Party	Emiliano Chamorro Benard	49,401	24.37	14	3
Special seats (Note: Two former presidents as life members and the defeated presidential candidate. All were members of the Conservative Party.)				0	3
Total		202,698	100.00	42	18
Source: Nohlen

== Bibliography ==
- Elections in the Americas A Data Handbook Volume 1. North America, Central America, and the Caribbean. Edited by Dieter Nohlen. 2005.
- Millett, Richard. Guardians of the dynasty: a history of the U.S. created Guardia Nacional de Nicaragua and the Somoza Family. Maryknoll: Orbis Books. 1977.
- Political handbook of the world 1954. New York, 1955.
- Walter, Knut. The regime of Anastasio Somoza, 1936–1956. Chapel Hill: The University of North Carolina. 1993.
