= Orlando Montenegro Medrano =

Acting president of Nicaragua in 1966

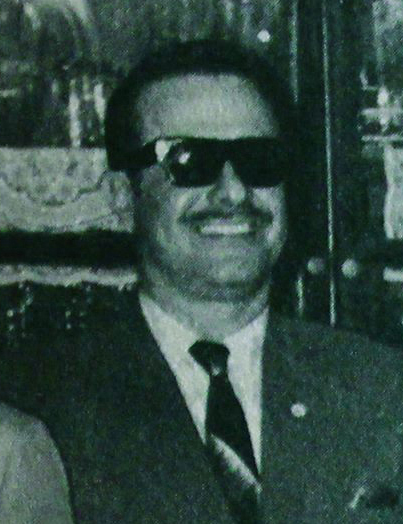

Acting President of Nicaragua
- In office 3 August 1966 – 4 August 1966
- Vice President: Silvio Argüello Cardenal and Gustavo Raskosky
- Preceded by: René Schick
- Succeeded by: Lorenzo Guerrero

Personal details
- Born: 15 May 1920
- Died: 29 October 1988 (aged 68) Miami, United States

Orlando Montenegro Medrano (15 May 1920 – 29 October 1988) was a Nicaraguan politician and attorney who served as acting President of Nicaragua in 1966, following the death of President René Schick. He was the president of the Chamber of Deputies of National Congress of Nicaragua 1961-1962, 1965-1966, 1968-1969, 1970–1972 and in 1976. He also served Ambassador of Nicaragua to the United Nations through the 1960s and 1970s. He also served as Mayor of Managua from 1976 to 1979.

Political offices
| Preceded by René Schick | President of Nicaragua; 1966 | Succeeded by Lorenzo Guerrero |
