= Co-ministers of Foreign Affairs (Nicaragua) =

This is a list of Foreign Ministers of Nicaragua from 1937 to the present day.

- 1937–1940: Manuel Cordero Reyes
- 1940–1946: Mariano Argüello Vargas
- 1946–1948: Víctor Manuel Román y Reyes
- 1948–1949: Luis Manuel Debayle Sacasa
- 1949–1956: Óscar Sevilla Sacasa
- 1957–1961: Alejandro Montiel Argüello
- 1961–1962: René Schick Gutiérrez
- 1962–1967: Alfonso Ortega Urbina
- 1967–1972: Lorenzo Guerrero Gutiérrez
- 1972–1977: Alejandro Montiel Argüello
- 1977–1979: Julio C. Quintana Villanueva
- 1979............ Harry Bodán Shields
- 1979–1990: Miguel d'Escoto Brockmann
- 1990–1992: Enrique Dreyfus Morales
- 1992–1997: Ernesto Leal Sanchez
- 1997–1998: Emilio Álvarez Montalván
- 1998–2000: Eduardo Montealegre Rivas
- 2000........... José Adán Guerra Pastora (acting)
- 2000–2002: Francisco Xavier Aguirre Sacasa
- 2002–2007: Norman Jose Caldera Cardenal
- 2007–2017: Samuel Santos López
- 2017–2024: Denis Moncada
- 2024–2025: Valdrack Jaentschke
- 2025–present: Denis Moncada and Valdrack Jaentschke

== Sources ==
- Rulers.org – Foreign ministers L–R
