= 1963 Nicaraguan general election =

- 3 February 1963
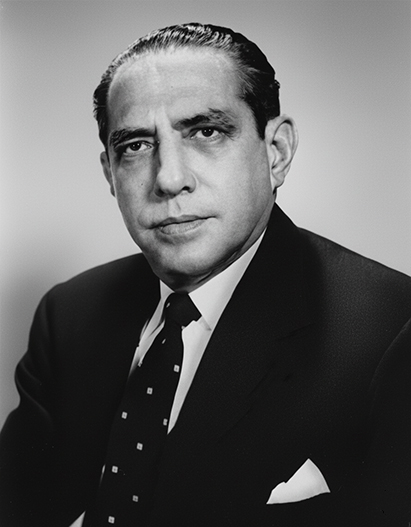
Nominee	René Schick	Diego Manuel Chamorro Jr.
Party	Nationalist Liberal Party	Conservative Party
Popular vote	408,131	42,933
Percentage	90.48	9.52
President before election
Luis Somoza Debayle
Nationalist Liberal Party
Elected President
René Schick
Nationalist Liberal Party

General elections were held in Nicaragua on February 3, 1963 to elect a president and National Congress.

"Evidence of massive impending fraud caused the Traditional Conservative Party to abandon its loyalist stance of the previous decade and to boycott the 1963 elections, thereby raising the party’s credibility among the public at large."

"The elections were held in an atmosphere of overwhelming apathy, and the official returns, which in some areas showed more voters than the total adult population, gave Schick a victory margin of better than ten to one." "Both the OAS and the U.S. embassy served as observers, although embassy officials later admitted that the accuracy of the preliminary and final vote count 'will never be known'."

== Results ==
Party	Candidate	Votes	%	Seats	
Party	Candidate	Votes	%	Chamber	Senate
Nationalist Liberal Party	René Schick	408,131	90.48	28	12
Conservative Party	Diego Manuel Chamorro Jr.	42,933	9.52	14	4
Special seats (Note: Two former presidents as life members and the defeated presidential candidate. All were members of the Conservative Party)				0	3
Total		451,064	100.00	42	19
Registered voters/turnout		570,000	–		
Source: Nohlen

== Bibliography ==
- Booth, John A. The end and the beginning: the Nicaraguan revolution. Boulder: Westview Press. Second edition, revised and updated. 1985.
- Elections in the Americas A Data Handbook Volume 1. North America, Central America, and the Caribbean. Edited by Dieter Nohlen. 2005.
- Gambone, Michael D. Capturing the revolution: the United States, Central America, and Nicaragua, 1961-1972. Westport: Praeger. 2001.
- Leonard, Thomas M. “The quest for Central American democracy since 1945.” Assessing democracy in Latin America. 1998. Boulder: Westview Press.
- Millett, Richard. Guardians of the dynasty: a history of the U.S. created Guardia Nacional de Nicaragua and the Somoza Family. Maryknoll: Orbis Books. 1977.
- Political handbook of the world 1968. New York, 1969.
- Walker, Thomas W. The Christian Democratic movement in Nicaragua. Tucson: University of Arizona Press. 1970.
