= National Opposition Union =

National Opposition Union may refer to:

- National Opposition Union (El Salvador), a Salvadoran political coalition
- National Opposition Union (Nicaragua, 1966), a Nicaraguan political coalition
- National Opposition Union (Nicaragua, 1990), a Nicaraguan political coalition
