= 1967 Nicaraguan general election =

- 5 February 1967
- Presidential election
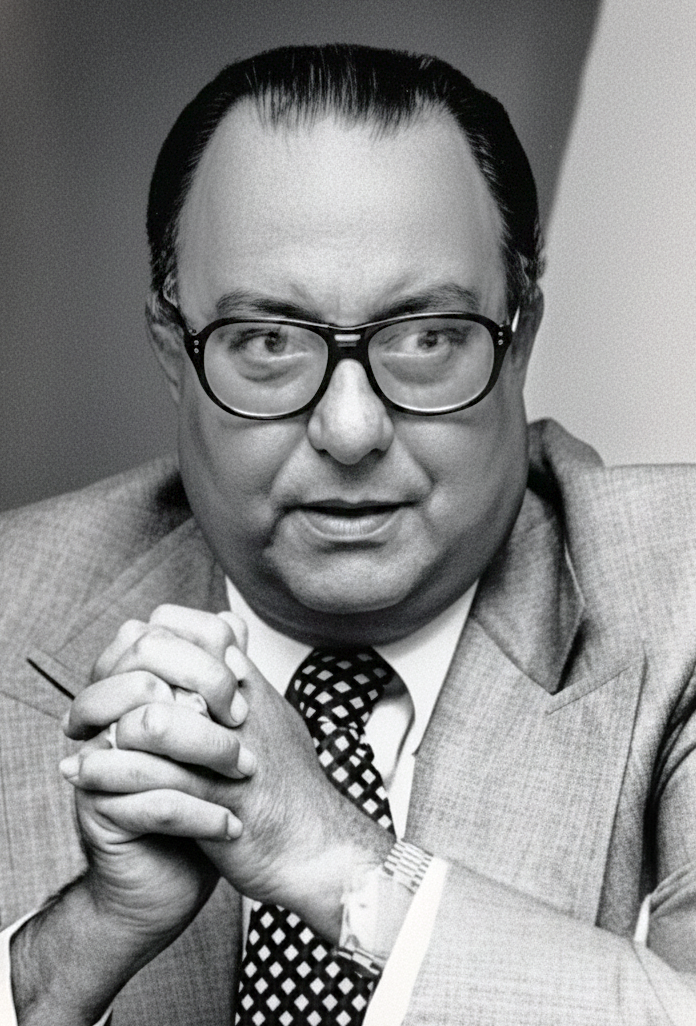

Nominee	Anastasio Somoza Debayle	Fernando Agüero
Party	PLN	UNO
Popular vote	380,162	157,432
Percentage	70.31	29.12
President before election
Lorenzo Guerrero
PLN
Elected President
Anastasio Somoza Debayle
PLN

General elections were held in Nicaragua on February 5, 1967, to elect a president and National Congress.

"Fernando Agüero led the Conservative presidential slate again in the 1967 presidential contest and was the sole nominee of the National Opposition Union (Unión Nacional Opositora – UNO) coalition. The Conservatives (then at the apogee of their popular support) and their Social Christian and Independent Liberal allies mobilized widespread popular opposition to the first presidential candidacy of National Guard head Anastasio Somoza Debayle. Although UNO lost the presidency to the Liberals the PPSC did win one seat each in the House and Senate".

"In retrospect, the election of 1967 was the zenith of the Somozan political and electoral apparatus. From that time on, the younger Somoza took personal charge of everything, excluded the principal power groups of the Liberal Party, and started a gradual decline in the electoral efforts which eventually lost all pretense at being democratic at the domestic level".

== Results ==
Party	Candidate	Votes	%	Seats	
Party	Candidate	Votes	%	Chamber	Senate
Nationalist Liberal Party	Anastasio Somoza Debayle	380,162	70.31	35	11
National Opposition Union (PCN–PLI–PSC)	Fernando Agüero	157,432	29.12	17	6
Conservative Party	Alejandro Abaúnza Marenco	3,120	0.58	1	0
Special seats (Note: Former vice-president as lifetime senator)				0	1
Total		540,714	100.00	53	18
Source: Nohlen

== Bibliography ==
- Booth, John A. The end and the beginning: the Nicaraguan revolution. Boulder: Westview Press. Second edition, revised and updated. 1985.
- Bowdler, George A. and Patrick Cotter. Voter participation in Central America, 1954-1981: an exploration. Washington, D.C.: University Press of America. 1982.
- Elections in the Americas A Data Handbook Volume 1. North America, Central America, and the Caribbean. Edited by Dieter Nohlen. 2005.
- Gambone, Michael D. Capturing the revolution: the United States, Central America, and Nicaragua, 1961–1972. Westport: Praeger. 2001.
- Leonard, Thomas M. “The quest for Central American democracy since 1945.” Assessing democracy in Latin America. 1998. Boulder: Westview Press.
- Millett, Richard. Guardians of the dynasty: a history of the U.S. created Guardia Nacional de Nicaragua and the Somoza Family. Maryknoll: Orbis Books. 1977.
- Political handbook of the world 1968. New York, 1969.
- Smith, Hazel. Nicaragua: self-determination and survival. London : Pluto Press. 1993.
- Walker, Thomas W. The Christian Democratic movement in Nicaragua. Tucson: University of Arizona Press. 1970.
