= Alfonso Callejas =

Nicaraguan politician

Alfonso Callejas Deshón

Vice President of Nicaragua
- In office 1 May 1967 – 1 May 1972 Serving with Francisco Urcuyo
- President: Anastasio Somoza Debayle
- Preceded by: Silvio Argüello Cardenal and Gustavo Raskosky
- Succeeded by: Sergio Ramírez (1985)

Personal details
- Born: 27 October 1923 Chinandega
- Died: 28 August 2017 (aged 93)
- Party: Nationalist Liberal Party
- Education: University of Santa Clara

Alfonso Callejas Deshón (27 October 1923 – 28 August 2017) was a politician of Nationalist Liberal Party from Nicaragua.

He served as Vice President of Nicaragua from May 1967 to May 1972.

Callejas was born on 27 October 1923 in Chinandega. He was trained as a civil engineer and worked in Standard Fruit Company before founding his own business. Between January and August 1966, he was Minister of Development and Public Works in the Somoza cabinet. He was then appointed as Vice President of Nicaragua. In 1972, he broke with Anastasio Somoza Debayle. He went into exile in Honduras. After the 1979 revolution, Callejas returned, but went again into exile after his properties were confiscated.

He lived in voluntary exile from 1980 to 1990, when he returned to Nicaragua. From 1995 to 2000, he was a magistrate in the Supreme Electoral Council and in 2003 was appointed Secretary for Political Affairs of the Presidency by Enrique Bolaños.

He died in August 2017 in Chinandega.
