= 1974 Nicaraguan general election =

- 1 September 1974
- Presidential election
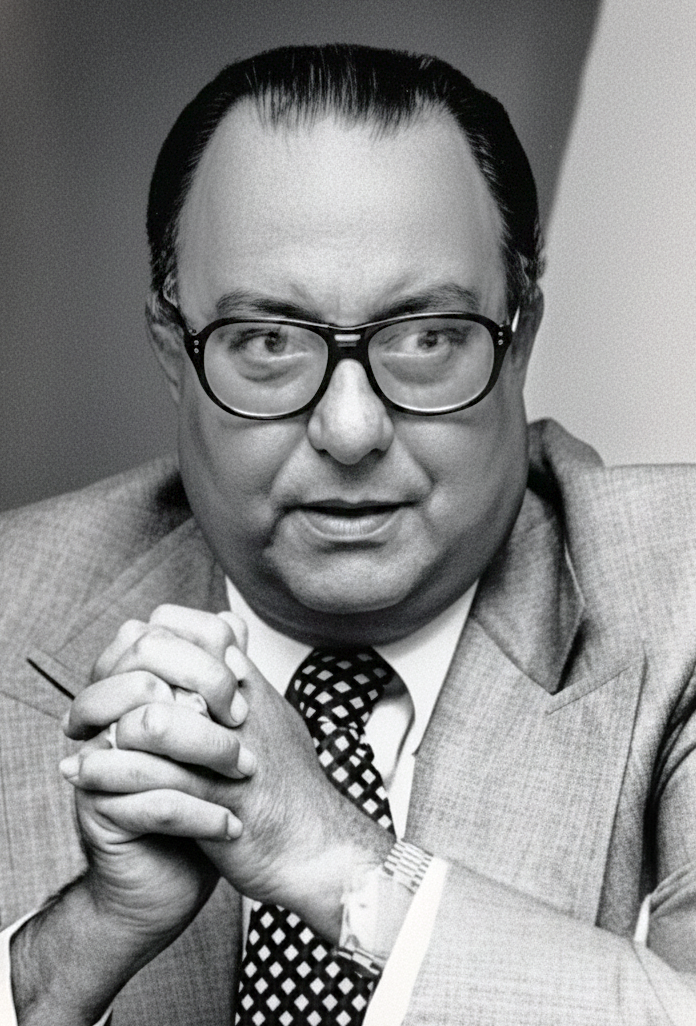

Nominee	Anastasio Somoza Debayle	Edmundo Paguaga Irías
Party	PLN	Conservative
Popular vote	733,662	66,320
Percentage	91.71	8.29
President before election
Liberal-Conservative Junta
Elected President
Anastasio Somoza Debayle
PLN

General elections were held in Nicaragua on September 1, 1974, to elect a president and National Congress of Nicaragua.

"The 1974 election was characterized by abstentionism. There were no incidents on election day; in fact very few people went to the polls, this in spite of the fact that the Supreme Electoral Tribunal reported voter registration of 1,152,268 citizens or 60.8% of the total Nicaraguan population, which is nearly 240,000 more than the number of citizens 18 years and older reported by the Census of 1971. The official results listed 733,662 votes for Somoza and 66,320 for the leader of one faction of the Conservative Party who ran against Somoza. The total percentage of votes cast according to official figures was approximately 69%."

Anastasio Somoza Debayle "won 743,985 out of 815,758 votes cast, the Conservatives picked up their allocation of 40 percent of the seats for fulfilling the tryst and an equal proportion of the electorate abstained. The very predictability of this result provoked a growing number of dissidents from the Conservative and Liberal Parties to join with the Independent Liberal Party, Popular Social Christian Party, Nicaraguan Socialist Party and a number of trade unions in forming the 'Unión Democrática de Liberación' (UDEL)."

== Results ==
Party	Candidate	Votes	%	Seats	
Party	Candidate	Votes	%	Chamber	Senate
Nationalist Liberal Party	Anastasio Somoza Debayle	733,662	91.71	42	18
Conservative Party	Edmundo Paguaga Irías	66,320	8.29	28	12
Total		799,982	100.00	70	30
Registered voters/turnout		1,152,268	–		
Source: Nohlen

== Bibliography ==
- Blackford, Gary S. Elections and democracy: a comparison of Nicaragua and Costa Rica. Kansas: University of Kansas. Unpublished master's thesis. 1992.
- Bowdler, George A. and Patrick Cotter. Voter participation in Central America, 1954-1981: an exploration. Washington, D.C.: University Press of America. 1982.
- Dunkerley, James. Power in the isthmus: a political history of Central America. London: Verso. 1988.
- González, Victoria. “Mujeres somocistas: ‘La Pechuga’ y el corazón de la dictadura nicaragüense (1936-1979).” Entre silencios y voces: género e historia en América Central, 1750-1990. 1997. San José: Centro Nacional para el Desarrollo de la Mujer y la Familia.
- Elections in the Americas A Data Handbook Volume 1. North America, Central America, and the Caribbean. Edited by Dieter Nohlen. 2005.
- LaFeber, Walter. Inevitable revolutions: the United States in Central America. New York: Norton & Company. Second edition. 1993.
- Millett, Richard. Guardians of the dynasty: a history of the U.S. created Guardia Nacional de Nicaragua and the Somoza Family. Maryknoll: Orbis Books. 1977.
- Political handbook of the world 1978. New York, 1979.
- Smith, Hazel. Nicaragua: self-determination and survival. London : Pluto Press. 1993.
- Stein, Andrew J. “The church.” Nicaragua without illusions: regime transition and structural adjustment in the 1990s. 1997. Wilmington: Scholarly Resources Inc. 1997.
