= Francisco Urcuyo =

Nicaraguan vice president (1967–72) and president (1979)

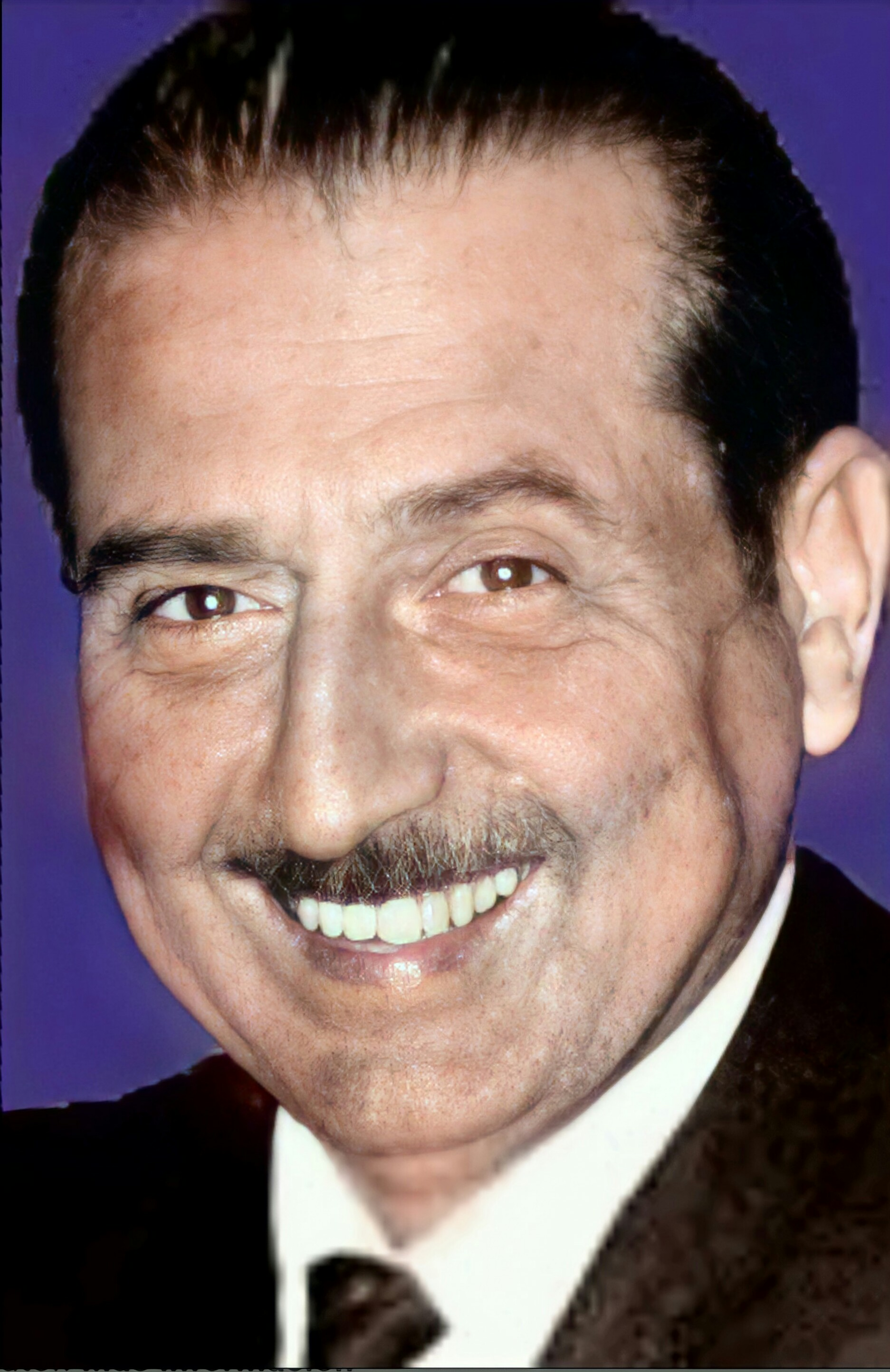
- Official portrait, 1967

Acting President of Nicaragua
- In office 17 July 1979 – 18 July 1979
- Vice President: Vacant
- Preceded by: Anastasio Somoza Debayle
- Succeeded by: Daniel Ortega

First Vice President of Nicaragua
- In office 1 May 1967 – 1 May 1972 Serving with Alfonso Callejas Deshón
- President: Anastasio Somoza Debayle
- Preceded by: Silvio Argüello Cardenal
- Succeeded by: Sergio Ramírez (1985)

Personal details
- Born: Francisco Urcuyo Maliaños; 30 July 1915 Rivas, Nicaragua
- Died: 14 September 2001 (aged 86) Managua, Nicaragua
- Party: PLN
- Spouse: María Luisa Muñoz
- Children: Francisco, Bayardo, Roberto and Mario
- Education: National Autonomous University of Mexico
- Occupation: Politician

Francisco Urcuyo Maliaños (30 July 1915 – 14 September 2001) was a Nicaraguan politician, who served as Vice President of Anastasio Somoza Debayle from 1967 to 1972, and President of Nicaragua, very briefly after Somoza fled the country in 1979.

Urcuyo was the president of the Chamber of Deputies of National Congress of Nicaragua from 1978 to 1979.

In July 1979, when Somoza resigned, Urcuyo was the president of the lower chamber of National Congress of Nicaragua. In 1979 he was handpicked by Somoza as successor to the presidency. Urcuyo became acting president of Nicaragua for a single day from 17 to 18 July 1979, following the resignation of Somoza on 17 July. Upon taking office, he announced his intention to serve out the remainder of Somoza's term. This announcement provoked a strong reaction from the Sandinistas, other Latin American states, and the Carter Administration in the U.S.

Recognizing the untenability of his situation, Urcuyo fled to Guatemala on 18 July, effectively handing the country over to the Junta of National Reconstruction.

== Biography ==
=== Life and political career ===
Urcuyo was born in Rivas on 30 July 1915. He studied abroad in Mexico and graduated from the National Autonomous University of Mexico as a surgeon in 1944. Urcuyo's political career began in 1954 and subsequently he served twice as vice minister of Health and president of the lower chamber of National Congress of Nicaragua. Later President René Schick appointed him as ambassador to Guatemala.

On 1 May 1967 Urcuyo was sworn in as Vice President of Nicaragua, serving with Vice President Alfonso Callejas Deshón in the second term of President Anastasio Somoza Debayle until May 1972, when the vice-presidency was abolished. Urcuyo was the president of the lower chamber of National Congress of Nicaragua 1972–1973 and 1978–1979.

In July 1979, when Somoza resigned, Urcuyo was the president of the lower chamber of the National Congress. After Somoza's resignation, Urcuyo was handpicked as Somoza's successor to the presidency and served for 43 hours before fleeing from Managua to Guatemala, essentially leaving the capital to the Junta of National Reconstruction.

=== Constitutional President (July 1979) ===
When the dictator Anastasio Somoza Debayle fled the country on Tuesday, 17 July 1979, Urcuyo Maliaños was invested as a new constitutional president, with a mandate until 1 May 1981, in accordance with the provisions of the Constitution of 1974. During his brief presidency, he declared the legality of his mandate, and quickly began to engage in dialogue with the various political forces in the country. But he refused to hand over power to the Junta of National Reconstruction on the grounds that he was not prepared. Also, he began to replace the most important army positions with young related officers. That same day, the Andean Pact foreign ministers meeting in San José de Costa Rica publicly rejected the Urcuyo maneuver: "We urge Urcuyo to abide by the obligation to transfer power, the only reason he occupies it. For his permanence in it will only contribute to the current contest acquiring new and more violent military dimensions. "

On the morning of 18 July, the three members of the Junta, Sergio Ramírez, Alfonso Robelo, and Violeta Barrios de Chamorro, left San José, Costa Rica, towards León, where they met with Daniel Ortega and Moisés Hassan Morales. León was proclaimed as the new provisional capital, and the international community recognized them as the legitimate government of the Republic. Shortly after, Urcuyo fled on board a plane to Guatemala.

Urcuyo was married to María Luisa Muñoz and had four children.

=== Published books ===
During his exile, he published four books, in which he detailed his experiences of the fall of the Somocist regime and his experiences in exile during the 1980s:

- Alone, in which he related the last hours of the mandate of the Nationalist Liberal Party (PLN) of Somoza.
- Betrayed Allies.
- Carter and the Communists.
- Poetry and Memories, which he dedicated to his family. Among his works is the song to the mother that begins, "Being stuck to my being as a conscience, love attached to my love as a sacrament".

== Death ==
Urcuyo died on 14 September 2001, aged 86, in Managua.

Political offices
Preceded by Silvio Argüello Cardenal	First Vice President of Nicaragua; 1967–1972; Served alongside: Alfonso Callejas Deshón	Vacant Title next held by Sergio Ramírez (1985)
Preceded by Anastasio Somoza Debayle	President of Nicaragua; 1979	Succeeded by Junta of National Reconstruction (as Head of State); Daniel Ortega (as President, 1985)
