= Alfonso Lovo Cordero =

Nicaraguan politician

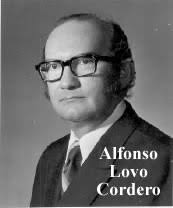
Alfonso Lovo Cordero, 1972

Alfonso Lovo Cordero (June 11, 1927 – May 10, 2018) was a politician from Nicaragua who served as the Minister of Agriculture. He was born in Ocotal, Nueva Segovia on June 11, 1927.

Under the Presidency of Anastasio Somoza Debayle, he succeeded in gaining for Nicaragua the title of “Granary of Central America“. After Somoza Debayle finished his term, while Nicaragua underwent a process of Constitutional reform, he was elected by the Constitutional Assembly to serve in the Liberal-Conservative Junta from May 1, 1972 until December 1, 1974.

Lovo Coredo died in Miami, Florida on May 10, 2018 at the age of 90.
