= Manuel Fernando Zurita =

President of Nicaragua in 1950

Manuel Fernando Zurita was President of Nicaragua in 1950.

Zurita later served in the Chamber of Deputies of Nicaragua and was the president of the chamber from 1952 to 1953. He was serving in the chamber at the time of Somoza's death in 1956 and was the representative of the Chamber at Somoza's funeral.

In 1958 Zurita was appointed the Nicaraguan ambassador to Spain.

Political offices
Preceded by Víctor Manuel Román	President of Nicaragua; 1950	Succeeded by Anastasio Somoza García
