= Liberal-Conservative Junta =

1972–1974 government of Nicaragua

The Liberal-Conservative Junta (Spanish: Triunvirato de Gobierno, lit. 'Government Triumvirate') officially ruled Nicaragua between 1972 and 1974, though effective power was in the hands of strongman Anastasio Somoza.

== History ==
Anastasio Somoza Debayle's term in office was due to end in May 1972 due to a law which disallowed immediate re-election. In 1971 Somoza signed the "Kupia-Kumi Pact" with Fernando Agüero's Social Conservative Party that allowed him to stand for reelection in 1974. Through this agreement, the conservative minority had their congressional quota increased to 40 percent. A constituent assembly was also established, and a triumvirate comprising one conservative (Agüero) and two nationalist liberals from Somoza's Nationalist Liberal Party designated to rule until the end of 1974, when new elections were to be held. Somoza would retain his post as the National Guard commander to ensure no loss of real power.

The members of the Liberal-Conservative Junta were General Roberto Martínez Lacayo and Alfonso Lovo Cordero (Nationalist Liberals) and Fernando Agüero (Conservative). In 1973, Agüero resigned and was replaced by another conservative, Edmundo Paguaga Irías.

On 23 December 1972, an earthquake struck the nation's capital, Managua, killing about 5,000 people and virtually destroying the city. The government declared martial law, and Somoza took over de jure as well as de facto control of the country as head of the National Emergency Committee.

== See also ==
- Anastasio Somoza Debayle
- Fernando Agüero
- Social Conservative Party

== Sources ==
- UCSD collections
- (in Spanish) Interview with Agüero
- (in Spanish) Presidents of Nicaragua

Political offices
Preceded by Anastasio Somoza Debayle	Presidency of Nicaragua; May 1, 1972 – December 1, 1974	Succeeded by Anastasio Somoza Debayle
