= Carlos Alberto Brenes =

President of Nicaragua (1884–1942)

Carlos Alberto Brenes Jarquín
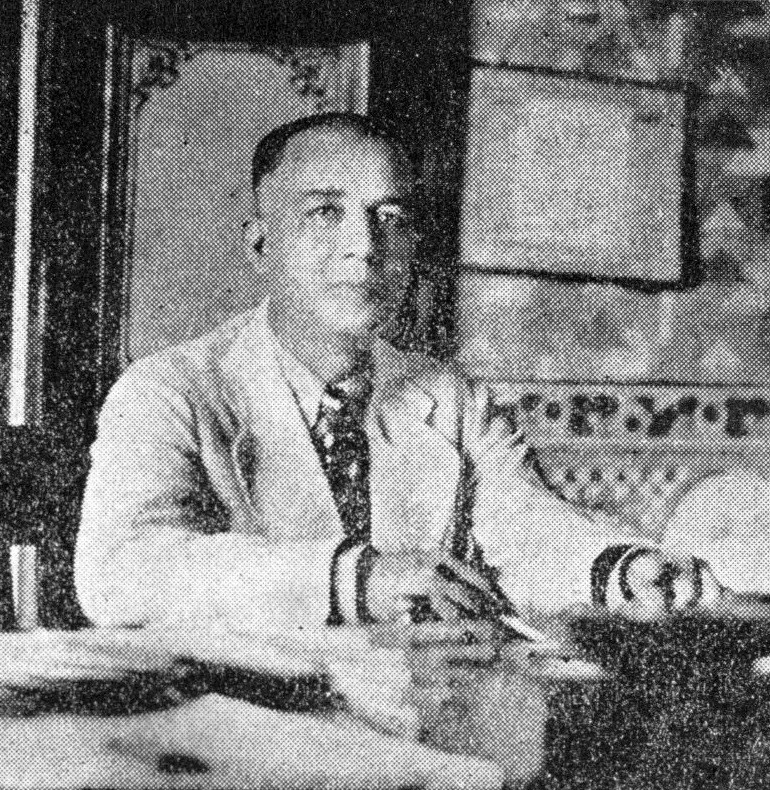

Acting President of Nicaragua
- In office 9 June 1936 – 1 January 1937
- Vice President: Vacant
- Preceded by: Juan Bautista Sacasa
- Succeeded by: Anastasio Somoza García

Personal details
- Born: 2 December 1884 Masaya, Nicaragua
- Died: 2 January 1942 (aged 57) Managua, Nicaragua
- Party: PLN

Carlos Alberto Brenes Jarquín (2 December 1884 in Masaya – 2 January 1942 in Managua) was the President of Nicaragua from 9 June 1936 to 1 January 1937. He was a member of the Nationalist Liberal Party. Brenes was the president of the lower chamber of National Congress of Nicaragua in 1936. He was installed as president by national guard commander Anastasio Somoza Garcia following a military coup on 9 June 1936, and remained in office until Somoza became president on 1 January 1937.

Political offices
Preceded by Juan Bautista Sacasa	President of Nicaragua; 1936–1937	Succeeded by Anastasio Somoza García
