= 1972 Nicaraguan Constitutional Assembly election =

Constitutional Assembly elections were held in Nicaragua on 6 February 1972.

== Results ==
Party	Votes	%	Seats
Nationalist Liberal Party	534,171	75.33	60
Conservative Party	174,897	24.67	40
Total	709,068	100.00	100
Registered voters/turnout	970,792	–	
Source: Nohlen

== Bibliography ==
- Elections in the Americas A Data Handbook Volume 1. North America, Central America, and the Caribbean. Edited by Dieter Nohlen. 2005.
- Pezzullo, Lawrence and Ralph Pezzullo. At the fall of Somoza. Pittsburgh: University of Pittsburgh Press. 1993.
- Political handbook of the world 1973. New York, 1974.
- Schooley, Helen. Conflict in Central America. Harlow: Longman. 1987.
