= Sergio Ramírez =

Nicaraguan writer and politician

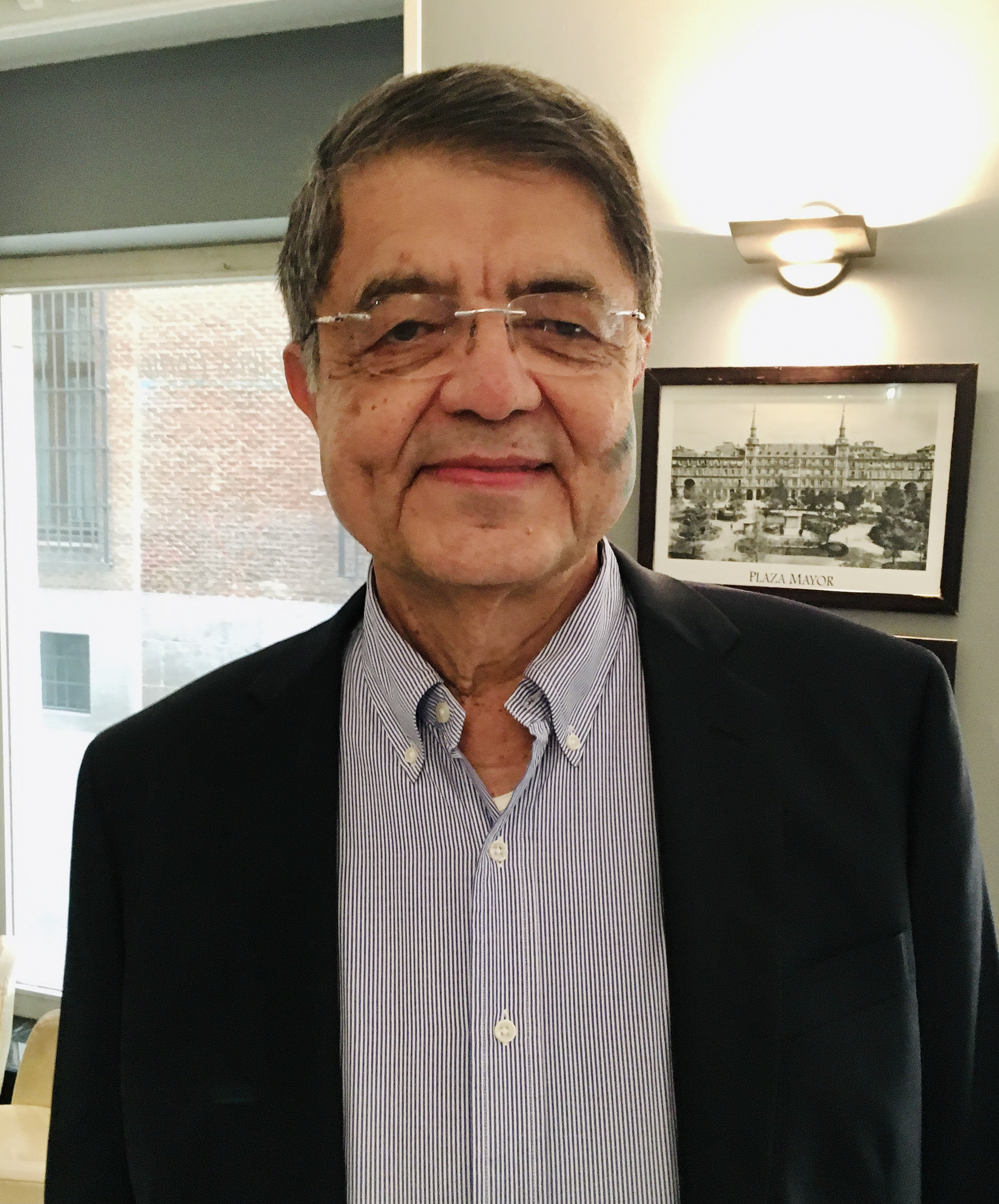
- Sergio Ramírez in Madrid to receive the Cervantes Prize (2018)

Vice President of Nicaragua
- In office 10 January 1985 – 25 April 1990
- President: Daniel Ortega
- Preceded by: Alfonso Callejas Deshón; Francisco Urcuyo (1967)
- Succeeded by: Virgilio Godoy

Seat L of the Real Academia Española
- Incumbent
- Assumed office 15 November 2026
- Preceded by: Mario Vargas Llosa

Personal details
- Born: Sergio Ramírez Mercado; 5 August 1942 (age 84) Masatepe, Nicaragua
- Party: FSLN, MRS
- Spouse: Gertrudis Guerrero
- Education: National Autonomous University of Nicaragua
- Website: Official Website

Sergio Ramírez Mercado (born 5 August 1942) is a Nicaraguan writer and intellectual who was a key figure in 1979 revolution, served in the leftist Government Junta of National Reconstruction and as vice president of the country 1985–1990 under the presidency of Daniel Ortega. He has been described as Nicaragua's "best-known living writer". Since the 1990s, he has been involved in the left-wing opposition to the Nicaraguan government, in particular in the Movimiento de Renovación Sandinista. He was exiled from the country in 2021 and stripped of his nationality by the government in 2023.

== Life and career ==
Born in Masatepe in 1942, he published his first book, Cuentos, in 1963. He received his law degree from the Universidad Nacional Autónoma de Nicaragua of León in 1964, where he obtained the Gold Medal for being the best student.

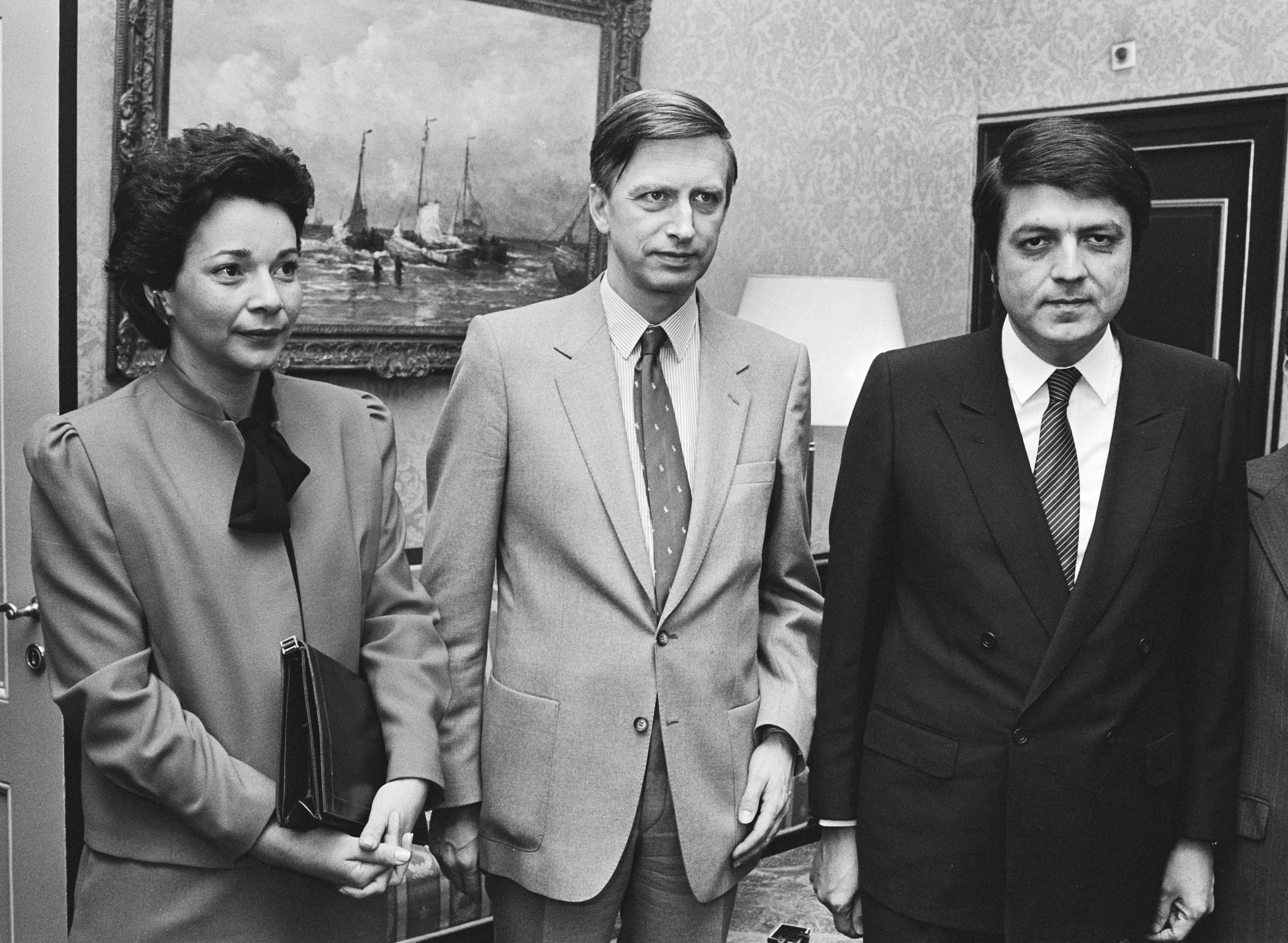
Ramírez (right) on a foreign trip with Nora Astorga and Dutch Speaker of the House Dick Dolman 1982

In 1977 Ramírez became head of the "Group of Twelve", a group of prominent intellectuals, priests, businesspeople, and members of civil society who publicly stated their support for the Frente Sandinista de Liberación Nacional (FSLN) in its struggle to topple the Presidency of Anastasio Somoza Debayle. The Group were forced into exile in Costa Rica, but their return was one of the key events heralding the end of the Somoza government. With the triumph of the Revolution in 1979, he became part of the Junta of the Government of National Reconstruction, where he presided over the National Council of Education. He was elected vice-president of Nicaragua in 1984 and was sworn in 1985.

Though the FSLN lost power to the UNO coalition headed by Violeta Barrios de Chamorro in 1990, Ramírez continued to serve as the leader of the Sandinista block in the National Assembly until 1995, when he founded the Movimiento de Renovación Sandinista (MRS) because of his differences with other leaders of the FSLN, such as former president Daniel Ortega, on issues of democratic reform. He has since become retrospectively critical of certain Sandinista policies that he views as having turned the country against the FSLN.

He made an unsuccessful bid for president on the MRS ticket in 1996. After the election, Ramírez retired from active politics to devote himself to literature. His literary work has since then being translated into more than twenty languages and has received numerous international distinctions, including the Carlos Fuentes International Prize for Literary Creation, awarded by Mexico in 2014, and the Cervantes Prize (2017). During this period, he lived in Managua but traveled extensively.

He married his wife, Gertrudis "Tulita" Guerrero Mayorga, in 1964. He has three children and eight grandchildren.

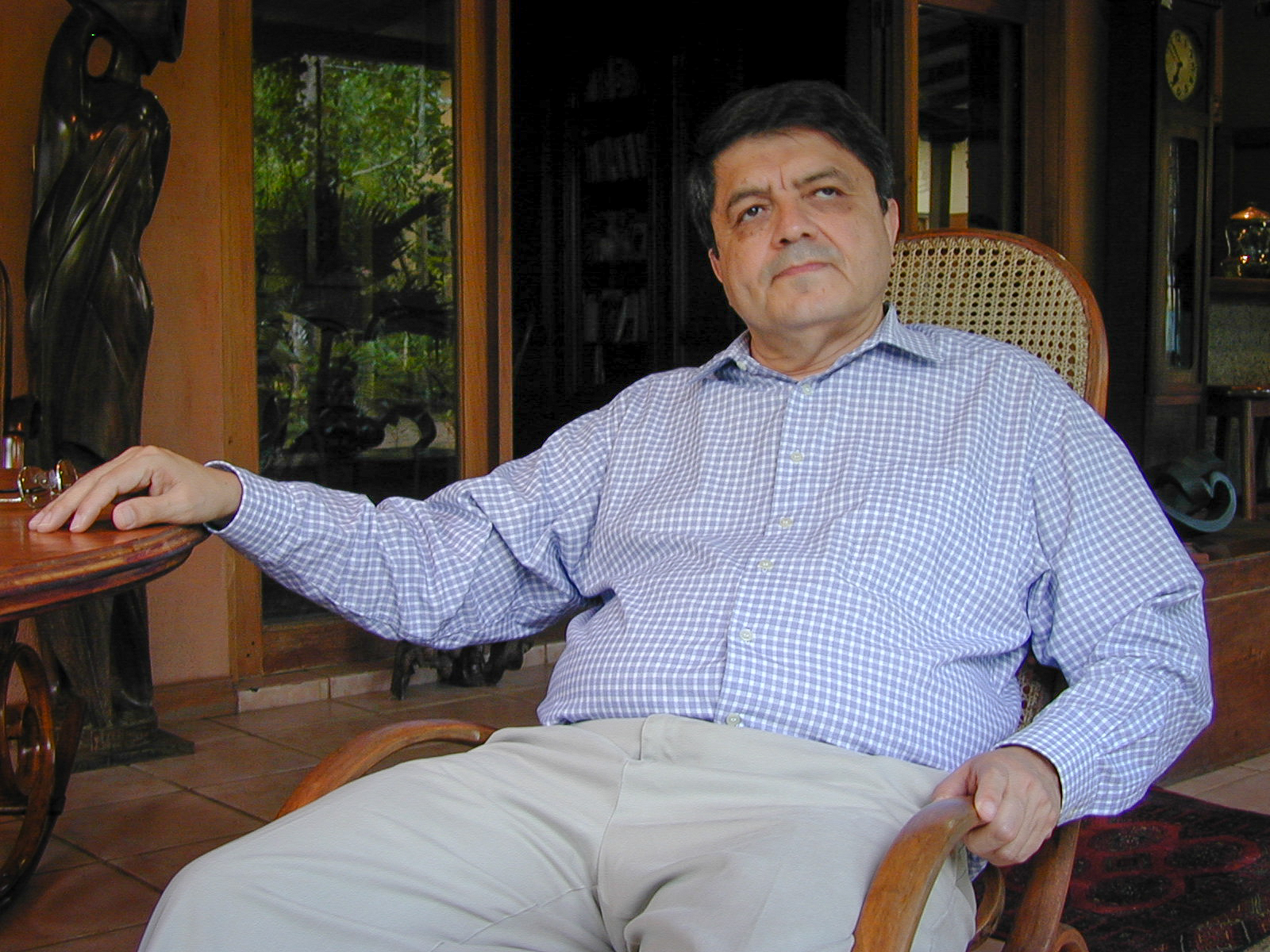
Sergio Ramirez at home in Managua. September 2001

In June 2021, he was forced into exile during repression of the opposition in the lead-up to the 2021 Nicaraguan general election; the government issued a warrant for his arrest in September. In February 2023, the Nicaraguan government stripped him, along with 93 other people, of his nationality. The United Nations Refugee Agency called the move "arbitrary" and said "[t]he exercise of fundamental rights, including freedom of expression, freedom of assembly or other rights associated with a person’s political views, can never justify the deprivation of nationality."

His home in Masatepe was seized by Nicaraguan authorities on July 1, 2023.

=== Writings ===
Ramírez began his literary career as a short story writer. His first story, "The student", was published in 1960 in Ventana, a magazine in León. His first book, published three years later, was a collection of stories, but the following, published in 1970, was a full-length novel. Since then, he has alternated these genres with essays and journalism. His international breakthrough came in 1998 when he won the Alfaguara Prize with his novel Margarita, How Beautiful the Sea.

In 1990, he founded La Quincena, a political journal based in Managua that would be published for ten years. He is presently a columnist for La Prensa as well as several newspapers around the world, including El País, La Jornada, El Nacional, El Tiempo and La Opinión. He is also the Director of Carátula, a Central American cultural e-magazine.

In January 2000, he was awarded the first "José María Arguedas Narrative Prize" from the Casa de las Américas. He has taught at the University of Maryland from 1999 to 2000 and again in 2001, and has been visiting professor at various major universities in the United States and Europe. He is also the President of Centroamérica cuenta, the most important literary festival in the region.

On 16 November 2017, Ramírez won the Spanish Ministry of Culture's Cervantes Prize, the most prestigious literary prize in the Spanish-speaking world.

In 2018, the Council of Ministers of Spain granted Spanish citizenship to Ramírez.

In February 2023, Ramírez was stripped of Nicaraguan citizenship by the Nicaraguan authorities.

His 2021 novel, Tongolele no sabía bailar (Tongolele Didn’t Know How to Dance) is a detective novel examining the 2018 protests. Copies of the book were seized by Nicaraguan customs officials.

== Awards and honors ==
- Latin American Short Story Award 1971 from Imagen magazine, Caracas, for his short story collection "De tropeles y tropelias".
- Dashiell Hammett International Prize 1990, for Divine Punishment
- Order Carlos Fonseca, the highest honor conferred by the FSLN (1990)
- Knight of the Order of Arts and Letters (France, 1993)
- Alfaguara Prize 1998 to Margarita, how beautiful the sea
- Prix Laure Bataillon 1998 for Best Foreign Novel published in France for Un ballo in maschera (Le bal des masques, Éditions Rivages, 1997)
- Casa de las Américas Novel Prize 2000 José María Arguedas for Margarita, how beautiful the sea.
- Presidential Honor Medal, Pablo Neruda´s Centennial (Chile, 2004)
- Masatepe´s Favorite Son, awarded by the Municipal Council (2005 Nicaragua)
- Jose Donoso Award (Chile, 2011).
- Officer of France´s Arts and Letters (France, 2013)
- Carlos Fuentes International Award for Literary Creation in Spanish Language granted by the Government of Mexico, through the National Council for Culture and Arts (Mexico, 2014)
- Miguel de Cervantes Prize (2017)

== Novels and short stories ==
- Cuentos (1963)
- Tiempo de fulgor (1970)
- De Tropeles y Tropelías (1971)
- El Pensamiento vivo de Sandino (1975)
- Charles Atlas también muere (1976)
- ¿Te dio miedo la sangre? (1978)
- Castigo Divino (1988) (Divine Punishment, 2015)
- Clave de Sol (1993)
- Un baile de máscaras (1995)
- Cuentos Completos (1998)
- Margarita, está linda la mar (1998; Premio Alfaguara de Novela)
- Adiós muchachos (1999)
- Mentiras Verdaderas (2001)
- Catalina y Catalina (2001)
- Sombras nada más (2002)
- Mil y una muertes (2004)
- El Reino Animal (2006)
- Catalina y Catalina, Alfaguara México, 2001. Contiene 11 cuentos:
  - La herencia del bohemio, El pibe Cabriola, La partida de caza, Aparición en la fábrica de ladrillos, Perdón y olvido, Gran Hotel, Un bosque oscuro, Ya todo está en calma, La viuda Carlota, Vallejo y Catalina y Catalina
- Ómnibus, antología personal, cuentos, Editorial Universidad de Puerto Rico, San Juan, 2008
- Juego perfecto, Editorial Piedra Santa / Amanuense Editorial, Guatemala, 2008; 11 cuentos
- El cielo llora por mí, novel, Alfaguara, 2009 (The sky weeps for me, McPherson & Company, 2020)
- Perdón y olvido, antología de cuentos: 1960 - 2009 (2009)
- La fugitiva, novel, Alfaguara, 2011
- La girafa embarazada, children's short story (2013)
- Flores oscuras, Alfaguara, 2013. Contiene 12 relatos:
  - Adán y Eva, La puerta falsa, La cueva del trono de la calavera, Ya no estás más a mi lado corazón, Las alas de la gloria, La colina 155, No me vayan a haber dejado solo, Ángela, el petimetre y el diablo, El mudo de Truro, Iowa, El autobús amarillo, Abbott y Costello y Flores oscuras
- Lo que sabe el paladar. Diccionario de los alimentos de Nicaragua, compendio en comidas y recetas, 2014
- Juan de Juanes, relatos, Alfaguara México, 2014
- Sara: sus páginas beben del mito bíblico de Abraham y Sara 6
- A la mesa con Rubén Darío, short stoaries, 2016
- Ya nadie llora por mí, crime novel, Alfaguara, 2017
- Tongolele no sabía bailar, Alfaguara, 2021
- El caballo dorado, Alfaguara, 2024

Ramírez participated in the Stock Exchange of Visions project in 2007.

== Essays and testimonies ==
- Mis días con el rector, Ediciones Ventana, León, Nicaragua, 1965; artículos publicados en el diario La Noticia a raíz del fallecimiento del rector de la Universidad Nacional Autónoma de Nicaragua, Mariano Fiallos Gil
- Hombre del Caribe, Editorial EDUCA, Costa Rica, 1977 (biografía de Abelardo Cuadra)
- El muchacho de Niquinohomo, ensayo biográfico sobre Sandino, Unidad Editorial "Juan de Dios Muñoz", Departamento de Propaganda y Educación Política del FSLN, 1981 (reeditado en 1988 por la editorial Vanguardia, Managua)
- Pensamiento vivo de Sandino, 2 tomos, Editorial Nueva Nicaragua, Managua, 1981
- Balcanes y volcanes, Editorial Nueva América, Buenos Aires, 1983
- El alba de oro. La historia viva de Nicaragua, Editorial Siglo XXI, México, 1983
- Estás en Nicaragua, Munhnik Editores, Barcelona, 1985
- Las armas del futuro, Editorial Nueva Nicaragua, Managua, 1987
- La marca del Zorro, Editorial Nueva Nicaragua, Managua, 1989; 17 horas de conversación con el comandante guerrillero Francisco Rivera
- Quintero en septiembre de 1988
- Confesión de amor, con prólogo de Ernesto Cardenal; Ediciones Nicarao, Managua, 1991
- Oficios compartidos, Editorial Siglo XXI, México, 1994
- Biografía Mariano Fiallos, Editorial Universitaria, León, Nicaragua, 1997
- Adiós muchachos, Alfaguara 1999; una memoria de la revolución sandinista
- Mentiras verdaderas, Alfaguara México, 2001
- El viejo arte de mentir, Fondo de Cultura Económica, México, 2004
- El señor de los tristes, ensayos literarios, Editorial de la Universidad de Puerto Rico, San Juan, 2006
- Tambor olvidado, Aguilar, San José, Costa Rica, 2007
- Cuando todos hablamos, Alfaguara, 2008; contiene más de 200 artículos publicados en su blog en el portal literario El Boomeran(g)
