= Silvio Argüello Cardenal =

Nicaraguan politician

Vice President of Nicaragua
- In office 1 May 1963 – 1 May 1967 Serving with Gustavo Raskosky; Lorenzo Guerrero Gutiérrez
- President: René Schick; Lorenzo Guerrero Gutiérrez
- Preceded by: Mariano Argüello Vargas
- Succeeded by: Francisco Urcuyo Maliaños; Alfonso Callejas Deshón

Personal details
- Born: Silvio Reynaldo Argüello Cardenal; 2 December 1929 León, Nicaragua
- Died: 21 December 2024 (aged 95) Miami, United States
- Party: Nationalist Liberal Party
- Education: University of Nicaragua

Silvio Argüello Cardenal (2 December 1929 – 21 December 2024) the great grand son of Nicaraguan President Leonardo Arguello Barreto, is a politician and attorney fwho served as Vice President of Nicaragua from May 1963 to May 1967 and leader of Nationalist Liberal Party. During the presidency of René Schick, he was in charge of the Ministry of Economy, Industry and Commerce.

From 1967 to 1972, he held a seat in the National Congress of Nicaragua and in 1974 he was part of the national constituent assembly. He also served as Member of National Assembly of Nicaragua. Argüello emigrated to Florida by 1986 and worked as attorney.
