= Social Conservative Party =

Nicaraguan right-wing political party

The Social Conservative Party (Spanish: Partido Social Conservador - PSC) is a right-wing conservative Nicaraguan political party founded by its leader Fernando Agüero in 1988. The PSC received legal status in 1989 and participated in the 1990 elections as an independent party. Fernando Agüero was the conservative presidential candidate of the 1966 National Opposition Union (UNO) against the Somoza regime. In a UNO political rally in support of the candidacy of Agüero in Managua on January 22, 1967, the National Guard killed hundreds of oppositors.

Four years later, in 1971, Agüero signed the "Kupia-Kumi (Miskitu; translates as "One Heart") Pact" with Somoza whereby the Conservatives had their congressional quota increased to 40 per cent, a constituent assembly was established, and a triumvirate composed of Agüero and two Somocistas designated to rule until the end of 1974.

Before the 2006 elections, the party joined the Alliance for the Republic and then the Nicaraguan Liberal Alliance.
