= Mariano Argüello Vargas =

Nicaraguan politician

Vice President of Nicaragua
- In office 15 August 1947 – 22 November 1947
- President: Víctor Manuel Román y Reyes
- Preceded by: Francisco Navarro Alvarado
- Succeeded by: Silvio Argüello Cardenal, Gustavo Raskosky and Lorenzo Guerrero Gutiérrez

Personal details
- Born: 1890, Granada, Nicaragua
- Died: 1970, Miami, Florida, USA
- Party: Nationalist Liberal Party
- Education: University of St. Thomas

Mariano Argüello Vargas (1890–1970) was a top lawyer and politician from Nicaragua. who served as Vice President of Nicaragua in 1947. He was appointed alongside President Víctor Manuel Román y Reyes on 15 August 1947 on a temporary basis ., the post having been terminated on 22 November 1947 following the recognition of the Roman y Reyes' presidency by the Truman administration. .

He had a LL.D. law degree from the Universidad de Oriente y Mediodía. and was President of the Senate of National Congress 1945–1946, 1947–1948, 1952–1953, 1954–1955, 1956–1957, 1963 and 1966. He was president of the Chamber of Deputies from 1950 to 1952. He was Minister of Foreign Affairs from 1940 to 1946..He signed on behalf of Nicaragua, both the Treaty de Chapultepec, in Mexico City, Mexico, in March of 1945, and the UN Charter, in San Francisco, California, United States of America, in June of 1945.
