= The Captain and the Enemy =

1988 novel by Graham Greene

- Author: Graham Greene
- Cover artist: Michael Harvey
- Language: English
- Published: 1988
- Publisher: Reinhardt Books
- Publication place: United Kingdom
- Pages: 224
- ISBN: 978-1-871061-05-5

The Captain and the Enemy is the last novel published by the English author Graham Greene.

== Synopsis ==
The Captain and the Enemy tells the story of a young boy named Victor Baxter taken away from his boarding school by a stranger to live in London. This stranger is simply known as "the Captain" and he appears mysterious to Victor. In London Victor companions a woman named Liza and tells her any news that happens in the outside world. When Victor reaches manhood, he finally learns the secrets and intelligence of the Captain.
