= Constitution of Nicaragua =

Since 1826, Nicaragua has had 11 constitutions and many more reforms. While the first iterations set up three legitimate branches of government and outlined the rights of the people, the Constitution of 1987 represents a clear shift towards representative democracy. Reforms in 1995 gave extensive new powers and independence to the National Assembly. However, subsequent reform was limited by a pact between the Constitutionalist Liberal Party (PLC) and Sandinista National Liberation Front (FSLN) parties, representing a shift towards authoritarianism. In recent years, Daniel Ortega has consolidated power as president, and in 2025, the constitution was amended to allow for a co-presidency, bringing his wife, Rosario Murillo, into power. Under Ortega and Murillo, more changes are expected to further their authoritarian power.

== Constitution under the Federal Republic of Central America ==
=== Constitution of the Federal Republic of Central America ===
Nicaragua was one of the five countries that formed the Federal Republic of Central America in 1823 until it seceded in 1838. During this time, the Constitution of the Federal Republic of Central America (Constitución de la República Federal de Centroamérica) served as the overarching constitution for all five countries. This constitution addressed basic, fundamental rights (such as the conservation of liberty, equality, security, and property). It also introduced the separation of powers into legislative, executive, and judicial branches. It is in this constitution that patterns of representative democracy begin to emerge.

=== Constitution of the State of Nicaragua of 1826 ===
In 1826, Nicaragua legislated its own constitution, which corresponded to the mandate of the Constitution of the Federal Republic of Central America. The Constitution of the State of Nicaragua of 1826 (Constitución del Estado de Nicaragua de 1826) echoed the Federal Constitution with specific additions that clarified the established legislation.

== Constitution of 1838 ==
In 1838, Nicaragua permanently seceded from the Federal Republic of Central America. That same year, Nicaragua passed its first constitution independent from the federal union, the Constitution of 1838 (Constitución Política de 1838). Similar to its previous constitution, this constitution preserved many of the same principles. The separation of powers into three branches was clearly emphasized, and its specifics, as well as the protection of the fundamental rights of its citizens.

== Constitutions of 1858–1974 ==
Not many fundamental changes were made in these subsequent constitutions. In general, each time a new constitution was promulgated specific time frames and functions were added for clarity and judgement of the current regime.

== Constitution of 1987 ==
=== Historical context ===
The Somoza family dominated Nicaraguan politics from 1936 to 1979. The eldest of the dynasty, Anastasio Somoza Garcia, was a military leader who seized power from President Juan Sacasa in 1936. This marked a notable test in Latin America, as U.S. President Franklin Delano Roosevelt had recently announced the “Good Neighbor Policy”, which severely limited U.S. intervention in the internal affairs of Latin American nations. Despite Sacasa’s repeated request for American intervention, none came. This marked the beginning of a decades-long relationship between Nicaragua's first family and the U.S. During his tenure as president of Nicaragua, Anastasio Somoza rewrote the constitution multiple times to allow for his continued occupancy of Nicaragua's highest office. Shortly after one of these reforms, Somoza was shot dead while at a social event.

His son, Luiz Somoza Debayle, undid several of his father's reforms and established constitutional checks on the executive by restricting the ability of incumbents and their family members to run for the presidency. Because of Somoza Debayle’s reforms, his brother was unable to run for the presidency in 1963 despite controlling the National Guard and being regarded as Nicaragua's second most powerful man.

Nicaragua was led by Somozan allies until the youngest Somoza was elected president in 1967. Anastasio Somoza Debayle amended the constitution in 1971 and reached an agreement with opposition parties that would see Somoza step down from the presidency in 1972, yet be eligible for re-election in 1974. However, a catastrophic 1972 earthquake that struck Managua caused Somoza to declare martial law and retain much of his power, and he was re-elected as president in 1974. He remained in this position until being overthrown by the Sandinistas in 1979, and was eventually assassinated in Paraguay in 1980 by a group of Sandinista agents.

Somoza’s policies saw economic growth combined with an increasing wealth gap and a concentration of wealth in Nicaraguan cities-frusturating rural populations. Somoza was allied with the United States, but the political environment began to change as rural populations saw Castro's reforms in Cuba that elevated the living conditions of Cuba’s rural population. These frustrations saw the rise of the Sandinista National Liberation Front, more commonly known as the Sandinistas or the FSLN. With its origins in the 1960s, the FSLN waged a series of resistance campaigns against the Somozan political machine that culminated in the successful Nicaraguan Revolution of the late 1970s.

Following this series of devastating conflicts, the FLSN established a five-member Junta of National Reconstruction, which was later reduced to three members. This body oversaw the transition away from the Somozan political machine to FLSN leadership, which was solidified with the 1985 election of Daniel Ortega and the 1987 constitutional reform process that he championed.

=== Importance of the Constitution of 1987 ===
The Constitution of 1987 (Constitución Política de 1987) abolished the previous Constitution of 1974 when it was enacted. It is in this constitution that patterns of direct democracy begin to emerge. This sets it apart from previous constitutions, which primarily concerned themselves with representative democracy. While it’s still made clear that Nicaragua is a representative democracy, this constitution also proposes a fourth branch of government, the branch of those electing the representatives.

This constitution replaced the bicameral Congress, which had existed under previous constitutions, with a unicameral National Assembly. The makeup of the National Assembly, first established under the 1984 decree and confirmed by the 1987 constitution, consists of ninety members directly elected by a system of proportional representation plus any unelected presidential or vice presidential candidates who receive a certain percentage of the vote. Representatives propose legislation, which is made law by a simple majority of the representatives present if the National Assembly has a quorum. However, the executive retained strong powers, especially during national emergencies which allows the president to suspend basic civil liberties and to prepare and approve the national budget. The presidential term was reaffirmed as six years and the executive was given the power present the National Assembly with a list of candidates for the Supreme Court and choose the head of the Court. The justices can only be removed constitutionally "for reasons determined by law".

This constitution served as the framework for following reforms, and it established policies relevant to modern reforms. Article 2 of this constitution made voting, specifically popular vote, the official way of the public to exercise autonomy. Although this had been previously mentioned in previous constitutions, this is the first constitution in which direct democracy was established. Article 46 also echoed previous constitutions, by emphasizing the role of the state in protecting Nicaraguans and recognizing their basic rights. The participation of Nicaraguans in their social, political, and economic realms was protected by Article 50, distinctly through equal rights.

== Reform and democratic backsliding ==
=== 1995 ===
In 1990, the election of the opposition leader Violeta Chamorro provided a new opportunity to further democratize the nation. Although there was some opposition from the executive branch, 65 amendments were made to the constitution in 1995 that shifted power to the legislative branch, expanded democratic processes, and limited the executive. The president was restricted to serve only two nonconsecutive terms which was also lowered from six to five years. Another amendment added a second round of voting in presidential elections. A runoff election would be required if no one candidate managed to win 45% of the first vote. As for other institutional changes, three seats were added to the Supreme Court, raising the number of justices from 9 to 12. They also eliminated the military draft and refined language for the established right to private property.

=== 2000 ===
However, democratic change came to a stop in 2000 as new amendments to the constitution were made following a pact between PLC leader Arnoldo Alemán and FSLN leader Daniel Ortega. Due to their combined control of the legislature, they planned to consolidate two-party control of power by amending the constitution. These changes began the democratic backsliding on Nicaragua. Alemán and Ortega altered the rules so that - no matter which parties won in the next election - the FSLN and PLC would get to appoint members of the Supreme Court and the Supreme Electoral Council, expanding and repoliticizing the institutions. The Supreme Court added four seats to end up at sixteen, and the Electoral Council went from five to seven seats. Another change was made to limit the competitiveness of all other parties. Party alliances deemed unsuccessful would result in the penalty of losing official registration; this limited the ability of new parties to form and for smaller parties to threaten the dominance of the PLC and FSLN.

The other most significant changes made in 2000 were to the office of the presidency. Those who had previously renounced their Nicaraguan citizenship were no longer prevented from running for office, providing an opening for certain PLC members. Also, the PLC and FSLN leaders shielded themselves from facing charges of corruption, since Alemán specifically was under threat of criminal charges. Therefore, the constitution was amended for the president to automatically get a seat in the National Assembly when they leave office. Legislators in the Assembly have immunity from criminal prosecution, and this protection was solidified with a new requirement of a two-thirds vote to remove anyone's immunity.

=== 2009 ===
Although the constitution was not literally amended in 2009, a Supreme Court decision greatly changed the power given to the executive. FSLN leader Daniel Ortega was seeking reelection, but he failed to get enough support in the National Assembly to pass an amendment to remove term limits, so instead, he turned to the Supreme Court. The Court ruled in his favor, stating that Article 147 of the constitution was unconstitutional. Article 147 outlined the limitations of reelection, but the Court argued that they inhibited citizens’ right of political participation and choice. Their ruling went beyond term limits and ended up eliminating all restrictions for executive candidates except for those based on age and previous criminal conviction. Later, the National Assembly removed Article 147 from the constitution in its entirety, but the change had already been accomplished by the Court.

== Constitutional amendments of 2014 ==
In 2014, President Daniel Ortega’s administration enacted 43 constitutional reforms that significantly expanded the powers of the presidency and reshaped Nicaragua's political system. Ortega’s constitutional reforms of 2014 served as an important precursor to the 2016 election, where Ortega would run alongside his wife, Rosario Murillo, as the Vice President. One of the most consequential changes was the abolition of Article 147, which had previously imposed restrictions on presidential term limits. The president was also granted the power to rule by decree, making such decrees automatically become law, therefore neutralizing the legislature’s role in the lawmaking process. Furthermore, the chain of command within Nicaragua’s national security institutions was restructured, giving the president greater control over the military and police forces without external oversight.

== Constitutional amendments of 2025 ==
On January 30, 2025, the National Assembly passed an extensive package of constitutional reforms that amended 148 of the constitution’s 198 articles. Among the most significant changes was the modification of Article 132, which further consolidated military and police authority under the control of the executive branch. Through this reform, the presidency assumed direct oversight over the army, the Ministry of the Interior, and the National Police, effectively restructuring the national chain of command. Complementing this shift in authority, Article 92 was revised to incorporate the Patriotic Reserve Forces into the Nicaraguan army, expanding the military’s formal structure. In addition, the reformation of Article 97 introduced the creation of a volunteer police force, a measure that institutionalized paramilitaries alongside the existing National Police. The first group of these volunteer officers was formally sworn in by President Ortega on January 5, 2025, underscoring the government’s rapid implementation of new provisions. Together, these changes reflected a broader effort to reorganize Nicaragua's national security framework and reinforce centralized executive control over armed, policing institutions.

The 2025 Constitution made major changes in the composition of the presidency. Article 133 was revised and expanded to include two co-presidents. Each president would maintain equal power and still had to be elected through free and fair elections. One co-president must be male, and the other must be female, paving the way for Murillo to become Ortega’s co-president. With Murillo as his co-president, Ortega has been accused by various organisations of attempting to reestablish dynastic succession to Nicaragua's government, where their son will assume power after the two are no longer in power. Additionally, Article 135 raised the presidential term to 6 years. Under the revised Article 137, the presidents have the power to appoint vice presidents, surpassing the need for any free and fair elections.

== Protection of rights ==
Although the constitution of Nicaragua delineates clear and expansive protections of rights, it is in name only. Since the 2018 protests and resulting crackdown, the government has systematically violated due process amongst other basic protections. Human rights violations have only continued to worsen, especially with the 2023 constitutional amendment to Article 21 that allows the regime to take away citizenship from anyone deemed a “traitor to the homeland”. The regime’s use of this new Article leaves many people “stateless” and exiled, violating international law.

In 2025, the UN Group of Human Rights Experts on Nicaragua (GHREN) reviewed the most recent amendments by the regime and their repressive nature. The main goal of the regime is to entrench the power of the executive and control all possible opposition. One such reform was the “removal of the explicit prohibition of torture,” clearly a justification for violent repression. Although many changes are being made, the rights that are enshrined in the constitution are still routinely violated as the regime arbitrarily silences and disappears any perceived threats.

== See also ==
- Politics of Nicaragua
- Government of Nicaragua
- Human rights in Nicaragua
- Term limits in Nicaragua
