= 1947 Soviet Union regional elections =

Legislative election in the Soviet Union

- February 1947
Party	Leader	Vote %	Seats	+/–
AzKP(b)	Mir Jafar Baghirov		310 / 310	
ArCP(b)	Grigory Arutinov		340 / 340	
KPB(b)	Panteleimon Ponomarenko		204 / 204	
EKP	Nikolai Karotamm		100 / 100	
CNG(b)	Candide Charkviani		237 / 237	
KPKaz(b)	Gennady Kupriyanov		120 / 120	
KPKaz(b)	Zhumabay Shayakhmetov		300 / 300	
KPK(b)	Nikolay Bogolyubov			
LK(b)P	Jānis Kalnbērziņš		200 / 200	
CPL	Antanas Sniečkus		250 / 250	
PCM	Nicolae Coval			
VKP(b)	Joseph Stalin		750 / 750	
CPT	Bobojon Ghafurov			
CPT	Mikhail Fonin			
CPU(b)	Nikita Khrushchev		415 / 415	
CPU	Usman Yusupov			
This lists parties that won seats. See the complete results below.

On 9 February 1947, elections were held for the Supreme Soviets of the Soviet Union's constituent republics.

According to Soviet law, 2,422,000 out of an eligible adult voting population of 103,933,000 were disenfranchised for various reasons. These elections would be the first held after the Second World War.

== See also ==
- 1947 Estonian Supreme Soviet election
- 1947 Russian Supreme Soviet election
