= 1946–47 Guinean General Council election =

General Council elections were held in French Guinea in December 1946 and 5 January 1947.

== Electoral system ==
The 40-member General Council was elected by groups; the First College (French citizens) elected 16 members and the Second College elected 24 members.

== Results ==
Party	First round			Second round			Total seats
Party	Votes	%	Seats	Votes	%	Seats	Total seats
First College
Total	1,317	100	11			5	16
Registered voters/turnout	2,470	53.3	–			–	–
Second College
Total	76,769	100	14			10	24
Registered voters/turnout	133,142	57.6	–			–	–
Source: De Benoist
