= 1947 Ecuadorian parliamentary election =

Parliamentary election held in Ecuador

Parliamentary elections were held in Ecuador in 1947.

== Results ==
Party	Votes	%
Conservative Party	59,199	31.45
Ecuadorian Radical Liberal Party	52,505	27.90
National Democratic Civic Movement	34,922	18.55
Others	41,586	22.10
Total	188,212	100.00
Valid votes	188,212	94.17
Invalid/blank votes	11,648	5.83
Total votes	199,860	100.00
Registered voters/turnout	352,550	56.69
Source: Nohlen
