= 1947 Guatemalan parliamentary election =

Parliamentary elections were held in Guatemala between 24 and 26 January 1947 in order to elect half the seats in Congress. The Revolutionary Action Party won a plurality of seats.

== Results ==
Party	Seats
Revolutionary Action Party	29
Workers Republican-Democratic party	5
Total	34

== Bibliography ==
- Villagrán Kramer, Francisco. Biografía política de Guatemala: años de guerra y años de paz. FLACSO-Guatemala, 2004.
- Political handbook of the world 1947. New York, 1948.
- Elections in the Americas A Data Handbook Volume 1. North America, Central America, and the Caribbean. Edited by Dieter Nohlen. 2005.
- Gleijeses, Piero. 1991. Shattered hope. The Guatemalan Revolution and the United States, 1944-1954. Princeton: Princeton University Press.
- Rodríguez de Ita, Guadalupe. 2003. La participación política en la primavera guatemalteca: una aproximación a la historia de los partidos durante el periodo 1944-1954. México: Universidad Autónoma del Estado de México, Universidad Nacional Autónoma de México.
- Daetz Caal, Arnoldo. 1999. “Elecciones y partidos políticos.” Historia general de Guatemala. 1993-1999. Guatemala: Asociación de Amigos del País, Fundación para la Cultura y el Desarrollo. Volume 6.
