= 1947 Liechtenstein referendums =

Initiative to reduce the rate of taxation backdated to 1946
For	58.75%
Against	41.25%

Law on power plants
For	90.96%
Against	9.04%

Two referendums were held in Liechtenstein during 1947. The first was held on 10 January, on an initiative to reduce the rate of taxation, backdated to 1946, and was approved by 58.7% of voters. The second was held on 15 June concerning the law on power plants, and was approved by 91% of voters.

== Results ==
=== Reduced tax rate ===
Choice	Votes	%
For	1,498	58.7
Against	1,052	41.3
Invalid/blank votes	147	–
Total	2,697	100
Registered voters/turnout	3,218	83.8
Source: Nohlen & Stöver

=== Power plant law ===
Choice	Votes	%
For	2,173	91.0
Against	216	9.0
Invalid/blank votes	174	–
Total	2,563	100
Registered voters/turnout	3,203	80.0
Source: Nohlen & Stöver
