= 1947 Laotian parliamentary election =

- 24 August 1947
- All 35 seats in National Assembly; 18 seats needed for a majority
Party	Seats
Nonpartisan	35
This lists parties that won seats. See the complete results below.
Prime Minister before	Prime Minister after
Souvannarath; Independent	Souvannarath; Independent

Parliamentary elections were held in Laos on 24 August 1947 to elect members of the National Assembly, the lower chamber of Parliament. The election followed the promulgation of the Constitution of the Kingdom of Laos on 11 May 1947, which provided for the National Assembly to be elected by universal suffrage for four-year terms.

The election was held on a non-partisan basis, with all candidates running as independents, and no political parties contested the election. The 35 elected deputies formed the first National Assembly established under the new constitution. Prince Souvannarath was subsequently ratified as prime minister.

== Results ==
Party	Seats
Non-partisan	35
Total	35
Source: NDI
