= 1946–1947 Moyen-Congo Representative Council election =

The first elections to the Representative Council of Moyen-Congo (the French colony of present-day Republic of the Congo, also known as Congo-Brazzaville) were held between December 1946 and January 1947. A government decree, issued on 26 October 1946, had called for the holding of elections for Representative Councils in each of the territories of French Equatorial Africa.

The Representative Councils were divided into two segments, one elected by common law citizens (first college, i.e. French citizens) and one elected by citizens of professional stature (second college, i.e. Africans who were 21 years and above, and qualified as a member of one of twelve specified categories; civil servants, notables, soldiers and veterans, heads of native collectivities, members of native courts, etc.) In Moyen-Congo, the first college had 12 seats and the second college had 18 seats. As of November 1946 (the time of the French National Assembly election) the second college had 23,119 registered voters (out of a population of 684,000). The Congolese member of the French National Assembly, Jean-Félix Tchicaya (also the founder of the Congolese Progressive Party), had been the sole voice from French Equatorial Africa to condemn the separate electoral college system during the debates in the National Assembly in the run-up to the elections.

The Congolese Progressive Party (PPC) won the election, obtaining 15 of the seats. Their main rival, the socialist SFIO (led by Jacques Opangault) got nine seats.

== Results ==
Party	Seats
Congolese Progressive Party	15
French Section of the Workers' International	9
Others	6
Total	30
