= 1947 Colombian parliamentary election =

Parliamentary elections were held in Colombia on 16 March 1947 to elect the Senate and Chamber of Representatives, the first occasion on which the Senate was directly elected. The result was a victory for the Liberal Party, which won 73 of the 131 seats in the Chamber.

== Results ==
=== Senate ===
Party	Votes	%	Seats	+/–
Colombian Liberal Party	805,874	54.97	34	–7
Colombian Conservative Party	653,716	44.59	29	+7
Social Democratic Party	6,422	0.44	0	0
Total	1,466,012	100.00	63	0
Registered voters/turnout	2,613,586	–		
Source: Nohlen

=== Chamber of Representatives ===
Party	Votes	%	Seats	+/–
Colombian Liberal Party	805,732	54.71	73	–7
Colombian Conservative Party	653,986	44.41	58	+11
Social Democratic Party	11,577	0.79	0	–4
People's Front	1,391	0.09	0	–
Total	1,472,686	100.00	131	0
Registered voters/turnout	2,613,586	–		
Source: Nohlen
