= Fernando Agüero =

Nicaraguan politician (1917–2011)

Fernando Bernabé Agüero Rocha
- Born: June 11, 1917; Managua, Nicaragua
- Died: September 27, 2011 (aged 94)
- Occupation: Nicaraguan politician
- Political party: Social Conservative Party

Fernando Bernabé Agüero Rocha (June 11, 1917 in Managua – September 27, 2011) was a Nicaraguan politician and the founder (1988) and leader of the Social Conservative Party. In 1967, Agüero was chosen to represent the conservative 1966 National Opposition Union (UNO) in the presidential election against the Somoza regime. His campaign was marked by the bloody repression of one of his political rallies in Managua. In 1971, however, Agüero signed the controversial Kupia Kumi pact with Anastasio Somoza Debayle. As part of a ruling Liberal-Conservative Junta, being a placeholder until an election, he was co-president from May 1, 1972, until March 1, 1973.
