= Benjamín Lacayo Sacasa =

President of Nicaragua in 1947

Benjamín Lacayo Sacasa (27 June 1893 – 4 April 1959) was the President of Nicaragua from 27 May to 15 August 1947.

He was born in Granada, Nicaragua, the son of Daniel Lacayo Bermudez and Encarnacion Sacasa Cuadra. Lacayo Sacasa was the president of the lower chamber of National Congress of Nicaragua in 1934.

On 26 May 1947, he was installed with the help of former president Anastasio Somoza García, the commander of the National Guard, who had become dissatisfied with his recently elected successor, Leonardo Argüello Barreto. Lacayo served as president for three months.

He was a relative of Silvestre Selva, provisional Supreme Director of Nicaragua, Roberto Sacasa, 10th President, and his son Juan Bautista Sacasa, 18th President, as well as a cousin of Roberto Martínez Lacayo, President of Nicaragua from 1 May 1972 to 1 March 1973 and from 1 March 1973 to 1 December 1974, and Arnoldo Alemán, 28th President of Nicaragua.

Benjamin Lacayo Sacasa was the brother of Bertha Lacayo Sacasa, Emelina Lacayo Sacasa, Daniel Lacayo Sacasa and several other brothers and sisters. Bertha was married to Lisimaco Lacayo Solorzano and they had two children Chester and Will Lacayo Lacayo. Will Lacayo Lacayo was the father of Danilo Lacayo (children Mauricio Lacayo and Danilo Lacayo), Ligia Lacayo (children Karla Vanessa Zuniga Lacayo, Ligia Marcela Zuniga Lacayo and Gianncarlo Ortega), Bertha Lacayo (children Bertha Olivares Lacayo, Karina Olivares Lacayo, Carmen Olivares Lacayo and Ivan Olivares Lacayo) and Tania Lacayo (children Tania Melly Huete Lacayo and Afredo Huete Lacayo).

Political offices
Preceded by Leonardo Argüello	President of Nicaragua; 1947	Succeeded by Víctor Manuel Román
