= Víctor Manuel Román y Reyes =

President of Nicaragua from 1947 to 1950

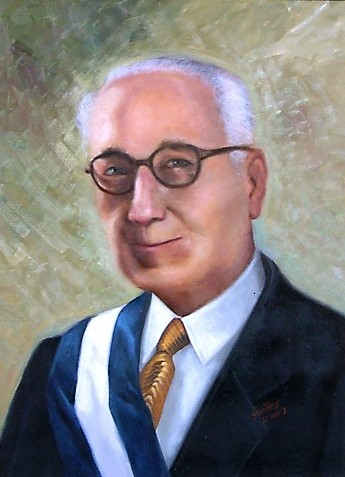
- Portrait of Román

28th President of Nicaragua
- In office 15 August 1947 – 6 May 1950
- Vice President: Mariano Argüello Vargas
- Preceded by: Benjamín Lacayo Sacasa
- Succeeded by: Manuel Fernando Zurita

Personal details
- Born: 13 October 1872 Jinotepe, Nicaragua
- Died: 6 May 1950 (aged 77) Philadelphia, US

Víctor Manuel Román y Reyes (13 October 1872 – 6 May 1950) was the President of Nicaragua from 15 August 1947 to his death on 6 May 1950. His Vice President was Mariano Argüello Vargas, a former Foreign Minister and President of the Senate of National Congress of Nicaragua.

Román was the president of the upper chamber of National Congress of Nicaragua 1929–1930.

Víctor Manuel Román y Reyes, also called T.V. (Tio Victor), was designated president by the General Assembly after a coup d'etat. He practiced former Nicaraguan president Zelaya's military philosophy. Zelaya's philosophy was based on former German Emperor Wilhelm II's military views. T.V. was a member of Somoza's Liberal Nationalist Party and after his death, his niece's husband Anastasio Somoza Garcia was then appointed to move forward with T.V.'s military.

President Víctor Manuel Román y Reyes died in Philadelphia. In his death bed, surrounded by his grandson, family and few fellow politicians including the secretary of the presidency (chief of staff) Alejandro del Carmen. Roman y Reyes signed the Liberal and Conservative Coalition Agreement of Nicaragua. It was he, who helped the minority enter Congress.

Political offices
Preceded by Benjamín Lacayo	President of Nicaragua; 1947–1950	Succeeded by Manuel Fernando Zurita
