= Conservative Nationalist Party =

Australian political party

The Conservative Nationalist Party was a minor Australian political party that ran two candidates for the Australian House of Representatives in the 1983 federal election.
