= National Opposition Union (Nicaragua, 1966) =

The 1966 National Opposition Union (Spanish: Unión Nacional Opositora - UNO) was a Nicaraguan political coalition founded on October 24, 1966, by the Conservative Party (PC), the Social Christian Party (PSC) and the Independent Liberal Party (PLI) to challenge the candidacy of Anastasio Somoza Debayle in the 1967 Nicaraguan general election. The UNO nominated Fernando Agüero as their candidate.

On January 22, 1967, UNO staged a massive demonstration in the capital city Managua in support of the candidacy of Agüero. Anastasio Somoza Debayle ordered the National Guard to attack the march and over 500 people were killed in a massacre.

After the defeat of UNO in the 1967 election, Agüero signed the "Kupia-Kumi Pact" with Somoza whereby the Conservatives had their congressional quota increased to 40 per cent, a constituent assembly was established, and a triumvirate composed of Agüero and two Somocistas designated to rule from 1972 to 1974.

== Sources ==
- Library of Congress
- UCSD collections
