= Lorenzo Guerrero =

President of Nicaragua from 1966 to 1967

Lorenzo Guerrero Gutiérrez
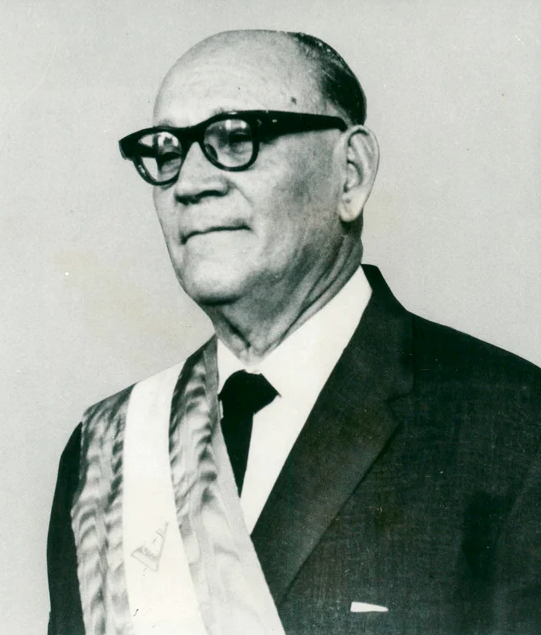
- Official portrait, 1966

32nd President of Nicaragua
- In office 4 August 1966 – 1 May 1967
- Vice President: Silvio Argüello Cardenal; Gustavo Raskosky
- Preceded by: Orlando Montenegro Medrano (acting)
- Succeeded by: Anastasio Somoza Debayle

Vice President of Nicaragua
- In office 1 May 1963 – 3 August 1966 Serving with Silvio Argüello Cardenal & Gustavo Raskosky
- President: René Schick
- Preceded by: Vacant
- Succeeded by: Silvio Argüello Cardenal; Gustavo Raskosky

Minister of Foreign Affairs
- In office 1 May 1967 – 1 May 1972
- President: Anastasio Somoza Debayle
- Preceded by: Alfonso Ortega Urbina
- Succeeded by: Alejandro Montiel Argüello

Personal details
- Born: 13 November 1900 Granada
- Died: 15 April 1981 (aged 80) Granada
- Party: PLN
- Occupation: Physician, surgeon, politician

Lorenzo Guerrero Gutiérrez (13 November 1900 – 15 April 1981) was a Nicaraguan politician who was a physician and surgeon by profession. He was mayor of his native Granada (1932), minister of Education (1934–1937), ambassador to Mexico (1937 and 1945), private secretary of the presidency (1943), member of the National Constituent Assembly (1947), ambassador to Costa Rica (1953) and Senator.

Guerrero was the president of the Senate of National Congress of Nicaragua 1949–1950, 1953–1954, 1956–1957 and 1962. Guerrero served as one of the Vice Presidents in the administration of René Schick from May 1963 to August 1966 and became President of Nicaragua on 4 August 1966 following the death of Schick. Guerrero served the remainder of Schick's term and following the 1967 elections, handed over the presidency to Anastasio Somoza Debayle on 1 May of that year. He, in turn appointed Guerrero as his Foreign Minister. He was a relative of his predecessor René Schick.

Political offices
Preceded by Mariano Argüello Vargas	Vice President of Nicaragua; 1963–1966; With: Silvio Argüello Cardenal and Gustavo Raskosky	Succeeded by Silvio Argüello Cardenal and Gustavo Raskosky
Preceded by Orlando Montenegro	President of Nicaragua; 1966–1967	Succeeded by Anastasio Somoza Debayle
