= Leonardo Argüello Barreto =

President of Nicaragua in May 1947

Leonardo Argüello Barreto (29 August 1875 – 15 December 1947) was a Nicaraguan politician who, after several attempts, became the President of Nicaragua in 1947. He served from 1 May to 27 May 1947. His older brother was the noted poet Santiago Arguello Barreto.

A member of the Nationalist Liberal Party, his presidency was cut short by a coup d'état orchestrated by the commander of the National Guard, General Anastasio Somoza García.

== Life and political race ==
Leonardo Argüello was born in León, Nicaragua. Working as a doctor in Leon, he entered Liberal Party politics in 1912. He participated in the Constitutionalist War of 1926. He served as President of the lower chamber of the National Congress of Nicaragua, and as Minister of Public Education, Interior and Foreign Affairs.

He was also a writer and diplomat. In the elections of 1936, he ran for president and lost to General Somoza. To the surprise of many, Somoza proposed that Argüello should be the candidate for the Liberal Party in the elections of 1947, and did not run for president himself. The elections were widely believed to be rigged, and one of the conditions for Argüello’s victory was reputedly the maintenance of Somoza as Commander-in-Chief of the National Guard.

== Presidency of the Republic ==
On 1 May 1947, during his inauguration before the Congress of the Republic, Argüello made a speech in opposition to the wishes of Gen. Somoza. In a part of his message he said:

I will not be, by the way, a simple figurehead.

From that day on, disputes arose between Dr. Argüello and Gen. Somoza. The excesses of the National Guard were denounced for the first time. The government published a list of the properties acquired by Somoza during his presidency. There were even rumours that president Argüello, without taking into account the Commander of the National Guard, had attempted to ally with factions of the military who were dissatisfied with Somoza, in particular with the young Aguirre Baca brothers, Francisco and Horacio. Nicaraguans found it ironic that until May 1, 1947, the date of Arguello’s becoming President, Francisco Aguirre had been President Somoza’s most trusted and feared military aid and confidant. These acts by Arguello and Francisco Aguirre infuriated Somoza, who hoped to have the absolute control of the country. The very same Congress that heard Arguello’s Ignaugural Address, declared him unable to govern three weeks later.

== Exile and coup d'état ==
On 26 May 1947 general Somoza led a coup d'état against the government, accusing it of conspiring to remove him as commander of the National Guard. The Congress declared that Argüello was unable to govern and removed him of the position, accusing him of attempting to undermine army discipline. The Assembly nominated Benjamín Lacayo, a puppet of Somoza, to succeed Argüello.

Arguello fled to the Embassy of Mexico, after less than 4 weeks into his mandate. He remained there 6 months, before he finally moved to Mexico without resigning the position of President of the Republic. The Aguirre Baca brothers, from their part, took up diplomatic refuge at the Embassy of Panama, and fled to that country, before finally moving to Caracas, Venezuela, then finally settling in the United States.

President Arguello died of an illness shortly after arriving in Mexico City on 15 December 1947. He is buried in Mexico City.

He was a cousin of María Argüello Manning, wife of Juan Bautista Sacasa Sacasa, 63rd President of Nicaragua.

Political offices
Preceded by Anastasio Somoza García	President of Nicaragua; 1947	Succeeded by Benjamín Lacayo
