= Nationalist Liberal Party =

Nationalist Liberal Party Partido Liberal Nacionalista
- Abbreviation: PLN
- President: Anastasio Somoza García (first); Anastasio Somoza Debayle (last)
- Founder: Anastasio Somoza García
- Founded: 1928; 98 years ago
- Dissolved: 20 July 1979 (47 years, 112 days ago)
- Preceded by: Liberal Party
- Headquarters: Managua
- Ideology: Nominal: Liberalism (Nicaraguan); National liberalism De facto: Authoritarian conservatism National conservatism Anti-communism; Pro-Americanism; Personalismo; Somocismo
- Political position: Right-wing to far-right
- Colors: Red and Blue

Party flag

The Nationalist Liberal Party (Spanish: Partido Liberal Nacionalista, PLN) was a political party in Nicaragua.

When Anastasio Somoza García took power in 1936, the party aligned itself with the United States and other caudillos in Latin America, like Rafael Trujillo, Oswaldo López Arellano, and Fulgencio Batista.

From 1936 to 1979, the office of President of Nicaragua was held by members of the Nationalist Liberal Party. When the first phase of the Nicaraguan Revolution was won by the FSLN, the PLN was dissolved by the new government. Many Somoza loyalists later supported or joined Contras rebel groups.

== History ==
Whilst initially it still featured a liberal agenda (the Liberals having been one of the two main parties of Nicaragua since the 19th century along with the Conservatives), the Nationalist Liberal Party later developed into little more than a political vehicle for the kleptocracy of the Somoza clan.

The party suffered several splits: in 1944, opposing Anastasio Somoza García's intentions to re-run for the presidency, dissident party members such as Manuel Cordero Reyes, Roberto González Dubón, Carlos Morales, Gerónimo Ramírez Brown (minister of public education from 1939 to 1944) and Carlos Pasos formed the new Independent Liberal Party, that functioned for decades to come as a legal, centrist opposition party and briefly sided with the Sandinistas to overthrow Somoza Debayle and cement the victory of the Nicaraguan Revolution. In 1968, another group of members, led by Ramiro Sacasa Guerrero (former minister for labor), split from the Nationalist Liberal Party, disagreeing with Anastasio Somoza Debayle's ambition to re-run. They formed the Constitutionalist Liberal Movement, which later evolved into the Constitutionalist Liberal Party.

The party was banned after the FSLN takeover in 1979.

== Notable members ==
- José María Moncada
- Juan Bautista Sacasa
- Anastasio Somoza García
- Luis Somoza Debayle
- Anastasio Somoza Debayle
- Leonardo Argüello Barreto
- Benjamín Lacayo Sacasa
- Víctor Manuel Román y Reyes
- René Schick
- Orlando Montenegro Medrano
- Francisco Urcuyo
- Lorenzo Guerrero

== Electoral history ==
=== Presidential elections ===
| Election | Party candidate | Votes | % | Result |
|---|---|---|---|---|
| 1936 | Anastasio Somoza García | 112,812 | 99.83% | Elected ✓ |
| 1947 | Leonardo Argüello Barreto | 104,804 | 61.76% | Elected ✓ |
| 1950 | Anastasio Somoza García | 153,297 | 75.63% | Elected ✓ |
| 1957 | Luis Somoza Debayle | 316,998 | 89.25% | Elected ✓ |
| 1963 | René Schick | 408,131 | 90.48% | Elected ✓ |
| 1967 | Anastasio Somoza Debayle | 380,162 | 70.30% | Elected ✓ |
| 1974 | Anastasio Somoza Debayle | 733,662 | 91.71% | Elected ✓ |

=== National Assembly elections ===
| Election | Party leader | Votes | % | Seats | +/– | Position |
|---|---|---|---|---|---|---|
| 1936 | Anastasio Somoza García | 112,812 | 99.83% | 30 / 43 | ▲7 | ▲1st |
| 1947 | Leonardo Argüello Barreto | 104,804 | 61.76% | 24 / 43 | ▼6 | 1st |
| 1950 | Anastasio Somoza García | 153,297 | 75.63% | 28 / 42 | ▲4 | 1st |
| 1957 | Luis Somoza Debayle | 316,998 | 89.25% | 28 / 42 | Steady | 1st |
| 1963 | René Schick | 408,131 | 90.48% | 28 / 42 | Steady | 1st |
| 1967 | Anastasio Somoza Debayle | 380,162 | 70.30 | 35 / 52 | ▲7 | 1st |
| 1972 | Anastasio Somoza Debayle | 534,171 | 75.33% | 60 / 100 | ▲25 | 1st |
| 1974 | Anastasio Somoza Debayle | 733,662 | 91.71% | 42 / 70 | ▼18 | 1st |

== See also ==
- Nicaraguan Revolution
- Somoza family
- Contras
- Progressive Liberal Party (Guatemala)
