= Anastasio Somoza García =

Dictator of Nicaragua from 1936 to 1956

Anastasio Somoza Garcia
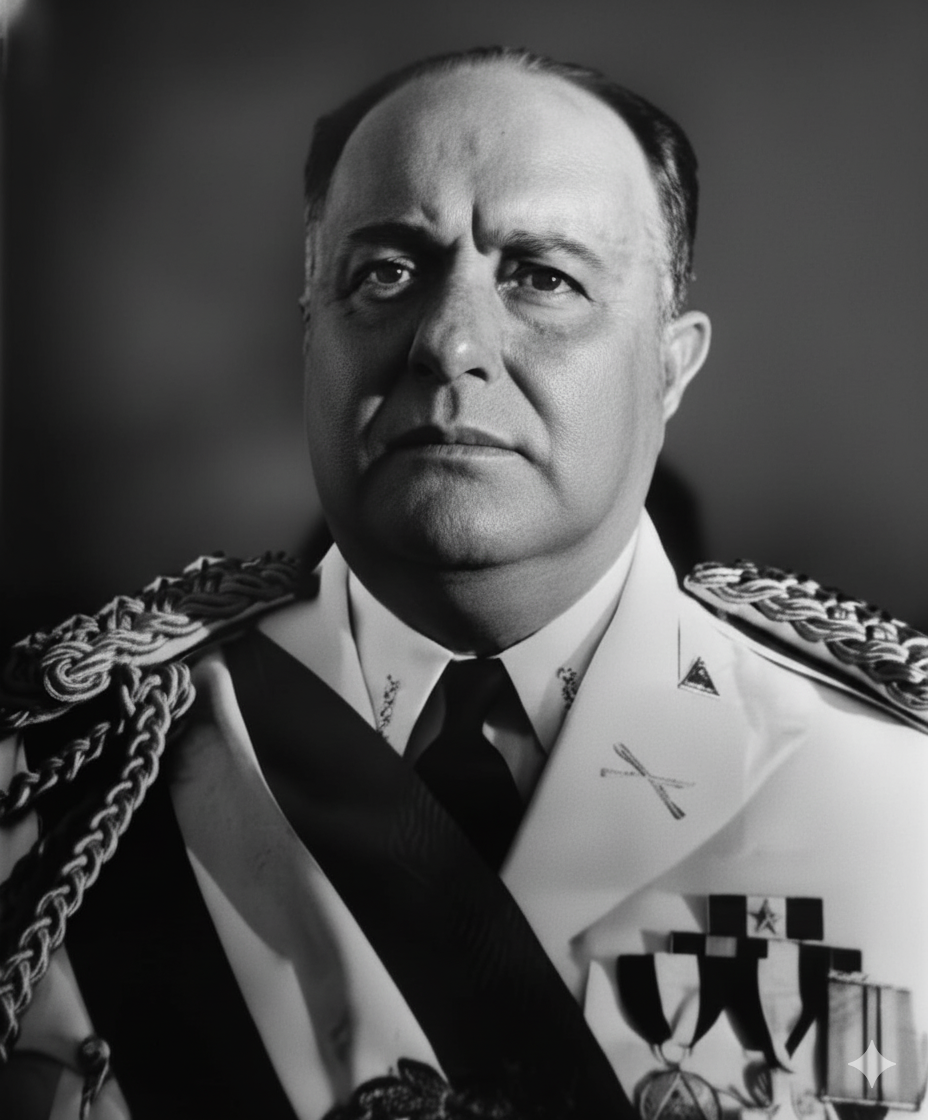
- Somoza in 1946

President of Nicaragua
- In office 21 May 1950 – 29 September 1956
- Vice President: Vacant
- Preceded by: Manuel Fernando Zurita
- Succeeded by: Luis Somoza Debayle
- In office 1 January 1937 – 1 May 1947
- Vice President: Francisco Navarro Alvarado (1937–1939); None (1939–1947)
- Preceded by: Carlos Alberto Brenes
- Succeeded by: Leonardo Argüello Barreto

Personal details
- Born: 1 February 1896 San Marcos, Carazo, Nicaragua
- Died: 29 September 1956 (aged 60) Ancón, Panama Canal Zone
- Party: Nationalist Liberal Party
- Spouse: Salvadora Debayle (m. 1919)
- Children: Lillian Somoza Debayle; Luis Somoza Debayle; Anastasio Somoza Debayle
- Profession: Politician, Army General

Military service
- Allegiance: Nicaragua
- Branch/service: National Guard
- Years of service: ?–1956
- Rank: Brigadier General

Anastasio Somoza García (1 February 1896 – 29 September 1956) was the leader of Nicaragua from 1936 until his assassination in 1956. He was officially the 21st President of Nicaragua from 1 January 1937 to 1 May 1947 and from 21 May 1950 until his assassination on 29 September 1956, ruling for the rest of the time as an unelected military dictator. He was the patriarch of the Somoza family, which ruled Nicaragua as a family dictatorship for 42 years.

The son of a wealthy coffee planter, Somoza was educated in the United States. After his return to Nicaragua, he helped oust President Adolfo Díaz. He became the foreign secretary and took the title of "General". With the help of the U.S. Marine Corps, which occupied Nicaragua at the time, Somoza became the head of the National Guard. This gave him the power base to remove his wife's uncle, Juan Bautista Sacasa, from the presidency, and make himself president in 1937. In 1947, an ally nominally succeeded him, but he retained power.

A month after his successor had been inaugurated, Somoza used the military to carry out a coup. The president was declared "incapacitated" by Congress and Somoza served in his stead. Returning to power in his own name in 1950, he maintained an iron grip on his own Nationalist Liberal Party while making a deal with the Conservatives; as a result, he faced no opposition. This left him free to amass a huge personal fortune.

On 21 September 1956, Somoza was shot by poet Rigoberto López Pérez. Mortally wounded, he was flown to the Panama Canal Zone where he died a week later. His eldest son Luis Somoza Debayle, who was speaker of the House at the time of Somoza's death, took over as acting president and was elected in his own right in 1957. He served as president until 1963, and as the power behind puppet presidents until his death in 1967. Somoza's youngest son, Anastasio Somoza Debayle, was elected to serve until 1972, then served as the real power behind a nominally bipartisan junta until being reelected in 1974. Somoza Debayle was forced to resign in 1979 and was assassinated in exile in Paraguay the following year.

== Early life and family ==
Somoza was born in San Marcos, Carazo Department in Nicaragua, the son of Anastasio Somoza Reyes, a wealthy criollo coffee planter, and Julia García, and a grandson of Anastasio Somoza Martínez and Isabel Reyes. As a teenager, he was sent to live with relatives in Philadelphia, where he attended the Peirce School of Business Administration (now Peirce College).

During his time in Philadelphia, Somoza learned how to speak English fluently. While living in Philadelphia, he met his future wife, Salvadora Debayle Sacasa, a member of one of Nicaragua's wealthiest families, daughter of Dr. Luis Henri Debayle Pallais and wife Casimira Sacasa Sacasa, daughter of Roberto Sacasa Sarria, 44th and 46th President of Nicaragua, and wife and cousin Ángela Sacasa Cuadra. After returning to Nicaragua, he was unsuccessful as a businessman. Somoza married Salvadora Debayle in 1919. They had two sons, Luis Somoza Debayle and Anastasio Somoza Debayle, and a daughter, Lillian Somoza de Sevilla Sacasa.

== Early political career ==
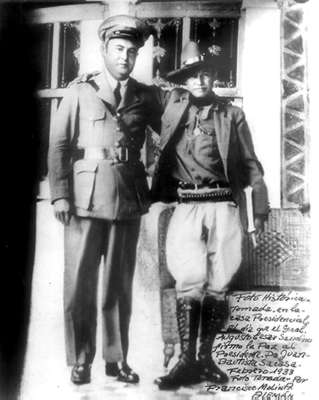
Somoza and Sandino in February 1933

In 1926, Somoza joined the Liberal rebellion in support of the presidential claims of Juan Bautista Sacasa, his wife's uncle. Somoza failed to distinguish himself in battle, leading an unsuccessful attack on the garrison at San Marcos; however, as a result of being educated in the United States, he spoke excellent English and acted as an interpreter during the United States-brokered negotiations between the warring parties. In the government of President José María Moncada, to whom he was distantly related, he served as governor of the department of León, Nicaraguan Consul to Costa Rica, and Foreign Minister. Despite his limited military experience, Somoza was able to rise through the ranks of the National Guard (Guardia Nacional), the constabulary force organized by the U.S. Marine Corps. After waging a bitter, six-year struggle with the forces of General Augusto César Sandino, in January 1933, the Marines evacuated the country following the election of Juan Bautista Sacasa as president. At the urging of the U.S. Ambassador Matthew E. Hanna, Somoza García was appointed as director of the National Guard. During peace talks, Somoza ordered the assassination of General Sandino on 21 February 1934 in violation of a safe-conduct agreement. Sandino's assassination was followed by the murder of former Sandino supporters by the National Guard.

== Ruler of Nicaragua ==
=== Control of government ===
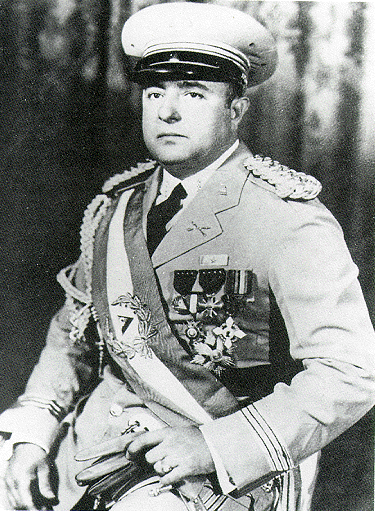
Somoza in 1936

In 1936, Somoza staged a coup with the National Guard, forcing Sacasa to resign in June. Carlos Alberto Brenes ruled for the remainder of the year and in December, Somoza was elected president reportedly with 64,000 of the 80,663 votes cast He took office on New Year's Day 1937. In May 1939, President Roosevelt honored Somoza and his wife Salvadora by welcoming them to Washington, D.C., for a state visit. Somoza, popularly known as "Tacho", amended the Constitution to centralize all power in his hands. Family members and key supporters monopolized key positions in the government and military. During a trip to neighboring Costa Rica, where Somoza visited newly-built schools, he commented on the state of education in his own country, "I don't want educated people, I want oxen."

=== Nicaragua during World War II ===
During World War II, the government confiscated the properties of Nicaragua's small, but economically influential German community and sold them to Somoza and his family at vastly lowered prices. By 1944, Somoza was the largest landowner in Nicaragua, owning fifty-one cattle ranches and forty-six coffee plantations, as well as several sugar mills and rum distilleries. Somoza named himself director of the Pacific Railroad, linking Managua to the nation's principal port, Corinto, which moved his merchandise and crops for free and maintained his vehicles and agricultural equipment. Although Nicaragua received Lend-Lease aid in World War II, the unwillingness of Nicaragua to actually fight meant it was given obsolete equipment (most of it being either purchased from the Soviet Union, Francoist Spain, and Estado Novo or captured Nazi German equipment) and no Western training. Somoza also made substantial profits by granting concessions to foreign (primarily the United States) companies to exploit gold, rubber, and timber, for which he received "executive levies" and "presidential commissions". He passed laws restricting imports and organized contraband operations, which sold merchandise through his own stores. He also extracted bribes from illegal gambling, prostitution, and alcohol distilling. By the end of the decade, he had acquired a fortune estimated to be $400 million.

=== Democratic window ===
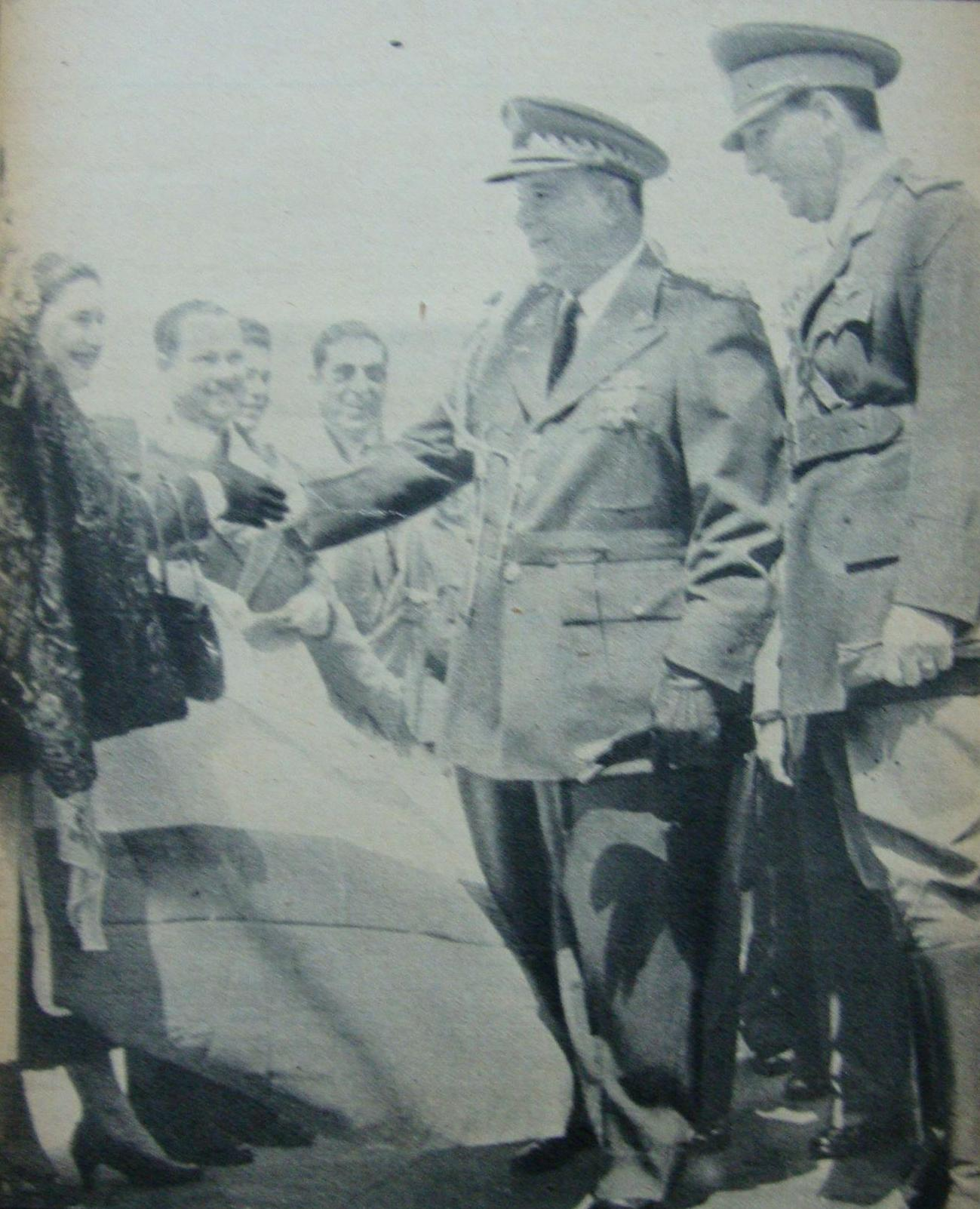
Somoza (left) with Argentine President Juan Perón in 1953

In 1944, under pressure from the United States, Somoza agreed to liberalize his rule. Unions were legalized, and he agreed not to run for re-election in 1947. The Nationalist Liberal Party nominated an elderly doctor named Leonardo Argüello, with Somoza using the National Guard to secure his election. Somoza intended for Argüello to be a mere puppet and to keep real power in his own hands until he could run again in 1952. Upon being sworn in as president in May 1947, Argüello displayed considerable independence, attempting to reduce the power of the National Guard and the control of Somoza and his associates over the economy. Less than a month later, Somoza orchestrated another coup, naming one of his wife's uncles, Benjamín Lacayo, as president. This definitively ended any hopes for further democratization in Nicaragua under the Somoza regime.

=== Second presidency ===
When the administration of U.S. President Harry S. Truman refused to recognize the new government, a Constituent Assembly was convened, which appointed Somoza's uncle, Víctor Manuel Román y Reyes, as president. In another heavily rigged election, Somoza García again became president in 1950. In the 1950s, he reorganized and streamlined his business empire, founding a merchant marine company, several textile mills, a national airline (LANICA, short for Líneas Aéreas de Nicaragua) and a new container port on the Pacific near Managua, which he named Puerto Somoza; after the Sandinistas came to power, they renamed it Puerto Sandino. He also acquired properties in the United States and Canada.

== Assassination and legacy ==
In 1955, the constitution was amended to allow Somoza to run for another term. Shortly after being nominated, he was shot on 21 September 1956 by the poet Rigoberto López Pérez in the city of León, and died eight days later at the Gorgas Hospital in the Panama Canal Zone. Somoza's sons, Luis and Anastasio Somoza Debayle, ruled the country directly or through figurehead politicians for the next 23 years. Despite widespread corruption and repression of dissent, they were able to receive support from the United States, which viewed them as anti-communist stalwarts and a source of stability. His daughter Lillian Somoza Debayle, born in León, Nicaragua, on 3 May 1921, married Guillermo Sevilla Sacasa, Nicaraguan Ambassador to the United States during his brother-in-law's rule. He also had a son named José R. Somoza, born to an unknown mother. Somoza is entombed with his oldest son Luis at Cementerio Occidental in the National Guard Mausoleum in Managua, Nicaragua.

=== "Our Son of a Bitch" ===
Although Somoza was recognized as a ruthless dictator, the United States continued to support his regime as a non-communist stronghold in Nicaragua. President Franklin D. Roosevelt supposedly remarked in 1939 that "Somoza may be a son of a bitch, but he's our son of a bitch." According to historian David Schmitz, researchers and archivists who have searched the archives of the Franklin D. Roosevelt Presidential Library found no evidence that Roosevelt ever made this statement. The statement first appeared in the 15 November 1948 issue of Time magazine and was later mentioned in a 17 March 1960 broadcast of CBS Reports called "Trujillo: Portrait of a Dictator". In this broadcast, it was asserted that Roosevelt made the statement in reference to Rafael Trujillo of the Dominican Republic; however, this statement has been attributed to a variety of U.S. presidential administrations in regard to foreign dictators. As a result, the statement remains apocryphal, although it is certain that Roosevelt and later presidents supported the Somoza family and their rule over Nicaragua.

== See also ==
- National Guard (Nicaragua)
- Nicaraguan Revolution

Political offices
Preceded by Carlos Alberto Brenes	President of Nicaragua; 1937–1947	Succeeded by Leonardo Argüello
Preceded by Manuel Fernando Zurita	President of Nicaragua; 1950–1956	Succeeded by Luis Somoza
