= List of wars involving Honduras =

This is a list of wars involving the Republic of Honduras and its predecessor states.

== Colonial Honduras ==
Conflict	Combatant 1	Combatant 2	Results
Raid on Puerto Caballos (1594)	Spain	England	English victory
Battle of Puerto Caballos (1603)	Spain	England French privateers	Anglo-French victory
Battle of San Fernando de Omoa (1779)	Great Britain	Spain	British victory
Action of 12 December 1779 (1779)	Great Britain	Spain	British victory
Battle of Roatán (1782)	Great Britain	Spain	Spanish victory: Spanish occupation of Roatán
Battle of the Black River (1782)	Great Britain	Spain	British victory

== Republic of Honduras ==
Conflict	Combatant 1	Combatant 2	Results
First Central American Federal War (1826–1829)	Protective Allied Army of the Law; Honduras; El Salvador	Federal Government; Guatemala	Protective Allied Army of the Law victory: Manuel José Arce deposed; Francisco Morazán elected president
Olancho Uprising (1829-1839)	Honduras	(Honduras) Olanchan rebels	Victory: Suppression of the rebellion; Agreement between the Honduran government and Olanchan rebels
War of 1832	Federal Republic of Central America: Guatemala; Honduras; Nicaragua	El Salvador	Federal victory: José María Cornejo is overthrown; Federal rule in El Salvador is restored
Domínguez's Expedition to Honduras (1831-1832)	Honduras	Conservative rebels	Honduran victory: Honduran independence is preserved
Second Central American Civil War (1838-1841)	Separatists: Guatemala; Nicaragua; Honduras	Unionists: Federal Republic of Central America; El Salvador	Separatist victory: Dissolution of the Federal Republic of Central America
Cordero's Expedition	Honduras	Guatemala	Victory: Defeat of Guatemalan forces
Uprisings of 1843	Honduras	(Honduras) Rebels supported byNicaragua	Victory: Suppression of the rebellion
Western Uprisings (1844)	Honduras	(Honduras) Rebels	Victory: Suppression of the rebellion
Malespin's War (1844)	Honduras El Salvador	Nicaragua	Victory: Leon is sacked by allied forces; Execution of Emilio Madriz
Honduran-Salvadoran War of 1845 (1845)	Honduras	El Salvador	Victory: Peace of Sensenti; Status Quo Ante Bellum
British Occupation of Trujillo and the Tigre Islands (1849-1850)	Honduras	United Kingdom	Victory: British forces leave Trujillo and Amapala
Battle of La Arada (1851)	El Salvador; Honduras	Guatemala	Defeat: Acta Constitutiva de la República ("Constitutive Act of the Republic"); Reassurance of Guatemalan sovereignty; Dominance of Guatemala in Central America
1851 Honduran Expedition to Nicaragua	Honduras Rebels	Nicaragua	Victory: José Trinidad Muñoz is overthrown
Battle of Los Llanos de Santa Rosa	Honduras	Guatemala El Salvador	Victory: Honduran Army repulses combined Guatemalan-Salvadoran armies; Jose Trinidad Cabañas retains the presidency
Honduran-Guatemalan War (1853-1855)	Honduras	Guatemala (Honduras) Rebels	Defeat: Overthrow of Jose Trinidad Cabañas
Filibuster War (1855–1857)	Allied Central American Army; Nicaragua; Costa Rica; El Salvador; Guatemala; Honduras; Legitimist Party	Filibusters; Walker's Nicaragua; Democratic Party	Central American alliance victory
Walker's Expedition to Honduras (1860)	Honduras; United Kingdom	(United States) American filibusters	Victory: Capture and execution of William Walker
War of the Priests (1860–1861)	Honduras; El Salvador	(Honduras) Anti-secular rebels	Victory: Victory of the Honduran Government Forces, Honduras became a secular state
Nicaraguan-Salvadoran War (1863)	Honduras El Salvador	Nicaragua	Defeat: Honduran-Salvadoran armies are defeated; Guatemalan-Nicaraguan alliance
Olancho War (1864–1865)	Honduras	Olancho Rebel Forces	Victory: Honduras manages to defeat the Olancho's rebels
Honduran–Salvadoran War of 1871 (1871)	Honduras	El Salvador	Victory: Overthrow of Francisco Dueñas
First Guatemalan-Salvadoran Intervention in Honduras (1872)	Honduras	El Salvador Guatemala	Defeat: Overthrow of José María Medina
Sherman Expedition (1873)	Honduras Guatemala	Salvadoran rebels Guatemalan rebels Costa Rica	Victory: Rebels repulsed
Bombardment of Omoa (1873)	Honduras	United Kingdom	Defeat: Recompensation for damages suffered for British subjects
Second Guatemalan-Salvadoran Intervention in Honduras (1874)	Honduras	El Salvador Guatemala	Defeat: Overthrow of Celeo Arias
Medinas' Revolt	Honduras	(Honduras) Medina's supporters Guatemala	Victory: The power is given to Marco Aurelio Soto through a negotiation; Defeat of Medina's and Guatemalan forces
1884 Coup attempt against Luis Bogran	Honduras	Nicaragua (Honduras) Honduran emigrants	Victory
Barrios' War of Reunification (1885)	Guatemala; Supported by: Honduras	El Salvador; Mexico; Costa Rica; Nicaragua	Defeat: Withdrawal of Guatemalan soldiers; Death of Justo Rufino Barrios
Policarpist Revolt (1893)	Honduras	Nicaragua Policarpist rebels	Victory: Defeat of Policarpist rebels; Policarpo Bonilla exiled in Nicaragua
Nicaraguan-Honduran War (1893-1894)	Honduras	Nicaragua (Honduras) Policarpist rebels	Defeat: Domingo Velasquez is overthrown; Policarpo Bonilla gains power
Combats of Carrizal and Calpules (1894)	Honduras	Nicaragua	Victory: Defeat of Nicaraguan forces; Settlement between Nicaraguan and Honduran governments
British invasion of Honduras (1898)	Honduras	United Kingdom	Victory: Expulsion of British forces from Honduran territory; Apologies to the Honduran government of part of the British; Financial compensation for families affected by the war; Compensation and reconstruction of damage caused by the British army.
Armed Conflict of 1903 (1903)	Honduras	(Honduras) Manuelista rebel army	Defeat: Victory of the rebel forces.
Honduran-Guatemalan War (1906)	Honduras	Guatemala	Victory: Honduras resists a Guatemalan Invasion
Armed Conflict of 1907 (1907)	Honduras; Supported by: El Salvador	(Honduras) Honduran rebels Nicaragua	Defeat: Rebel Forces manages to overthrown president Manuel Bonilla.
War of 1907 (1907)	Nicaragua (El Salvador) Salvadoran exiles (United States) American filibusters Honduras	El Salvador	Inconclusive: Status quo ante bellum
World War I (1918)	France; United Kingdom; Russia; United States; Italy; Japan; China; Canada; Australia; New Zealand; India; South Africa; Serbia; Montenegro; Romania; Belgium; Greece; Portugal; Brazil; Cuba; Panama; Guatemala; Nicaragua; Costa Rica; Honduras	Germany; Austria-Hungary; Ottoman Empire; Bulgaria	Victory: End of the German, Russian, Ottoman, and Austro-Hungarian empires; Formation of new countries in Europe and the Middle East; Transfer of German colonies and regions of the former Ottoman Empire to other powers; Establishment of the League of Nations
First Honduran Civil War (1919)	Honduras; Supported by: United States; Mexico	(Honduras) United Rebel Army	Defeat: Rebel forces overthrow President Francisco Bertrand
Second Honduran Civil War (1924)	Honduras	(Honduras) Constitutionalist Army; Supported by: United States	Defeat: Constitutionalist forces overthrow President Rafael López Gutierrez
Insurrection of 1924 (1924)	Honduras	(Honduras) Ferrera's Loyal Army	Victory: The modernized and experienced Honduran Army managed to handle better the conflict and lead to the defeat of general Ferrera's loyalist army.
World War II (1941–1945)	United States; Soviet Union; United Kingdom; China; France; Poland; Canada; Australia; New Zealand; India; South Africa; Yugoslavia; Greece; Denmark; Norway; Netherlands; Belgium; Luxembourg; Czechoslovakia; Brazil; Mexico; Panama; Costa Rica; El Salvador; Guatemala; Honduras; Nicaragua; Dominican Republic; Cuba	Germany; Japan; Italy; Hungary; Romania; Bulgaria; Croatia; Slovakia; Finland; Thailand; Manchukuo; Mengjiang	Victory: Collapse of the Third Reich; Fall of Japanese and Italian Empires; Creation of the United Nations; Emergence of the United States and the Soviet Union as superpowers; Beginning of the Cold War
Mocoron War (1957)	Honduras	Nicaragua	Victory
Combats of El Chaparral and El Dorado	Honduras	Sandinist Rebels	Victory
Dominican Civil War (1965–1966)	Dominican Loyalists; United States; Brazil; Paraguay; Honduras; Nicaragua; Costa Rica; El Salvador	Dominican Constitutionalists	Victory: Juan Bosch excluded from Presidency; Election of Joaquín Balaguer
Football War (1969)	Honduras	El Salvador	Ceasefire: Status quo ante bellum; Ceasefire by OAS intervention
Operation Golden Pheasant (1988)	United States; Honduras	Nicaragua	Victory: Withdrawal of Nicaraguan forces from Honduran territory
Iraq War (2003–2004)	Iraq; United States; United Kingdom; South Korea; Italy; Poland; Australia; Georgia; Ukraine; Netherlands; Romania; Denmark; Spain; El Salvador; Honduras; Nicaragua; Dominican Republic MNF–I: United States; United Kingdom; Australia; Romania; El Salvador; Estonia; Bulgaria; Moldova; Albania; Ukraine; Denmark; Czech Republic; South Korea; Azerbaijan; Singapore; Bosnia and Herzegovina; Republic of Macedonia; Latvia; Poland; Kazakhstan; Mongolia; Georgia; Tonga; Armenia; Slovakia; Lithuania; Italy; Norway; Japan; Hungary; Netherlands; Portugal; New Zealand; Thailand; Philippines; Honduras; Dominican Republic; Spain; Nicaragua; Iceland	Baath Loyalists; ISI al-Qaeda in Iraq; Mahdi Army; Special Groups; IAI; Ansar al-Sunnah Ba'athist Iraq	Victory: Invasion and occupation of Iraq; Defeat of Ba'ath Party government and execution of Saddam Hussein; Iraqi insurgency, emergence of al-Qaeda in Iraq, and civil war; Subsequent depletion of Iraqi insurgency, improvements in public security; Establishment of democratic elections and formation of new Shia led government; U.S.–Iraq Status of Forces Agreement; Withdrawal of U.S. forces from Iraq
