= Honduran Army =

- Ejército de Honduras
- The Honduran Army's emblem
- Founded: December 11, 1825; 200 years ago
- Country: Honduras
- Type: Army
- Role: Land warfare
- Size: 18,000 active (2024); 65,000 reserve (2024)
- Part of: Armed Forces of Honduras
- Patron: Our Lady of Suyapa
- Mottos: Honor, Lealtad, Sacrificio ("Honor, Loyalty, Sacrifice")
- Anniversaries: 3 October (Honduran Soldier Day); 11 December (Honduran Army Day)
- Engagements: List: First Central American Civil War (1827–1829); Second Central American Civil War (1838–1840); Honduran-Salvadoran War of 1845 (1845); Honduran intervention in Nicaragua (1851); Guerra de los Padres (1860-1861); Olancho War (1864-1868); Honduran-Salvadoran War of 1871 (1871); First Honduran Civil War (1919); Second Honduran Civil War (1924); Second World War (1941-1945); Mocoron War (1957); Football War (1969); Honduran gang crackdown (2022-)

Commanders
- Commander General of the Armed Forces: Nasry Asfura
- Minister of Defence: José Manuel Zelaya Rosales
- Army Commander: Brigadier General Carlos Efraín Aguilar Hernández

Insignia
- Army flag

The Honduran Army is one of the three branches of the Armed Forces of Honduras, as established by the 1982 Constitution. Its recruits are all volunteers.

== History ==
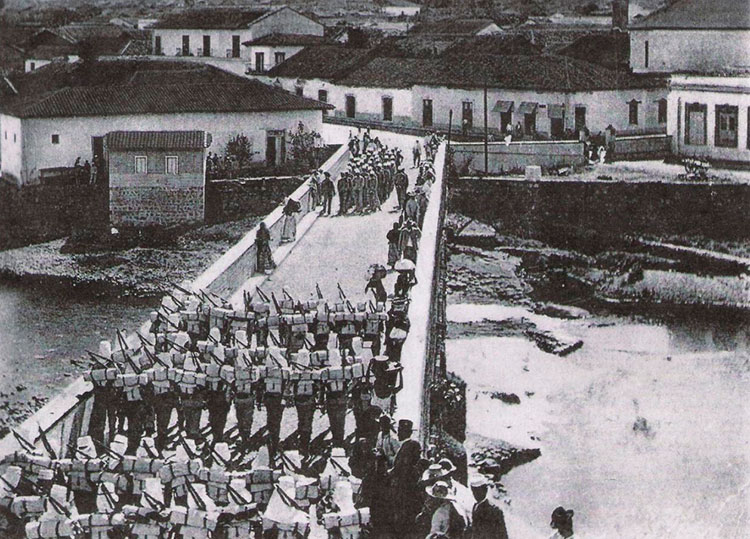
Honduran cadets in 1884

The Honduran Army has its roots in the post-independence years, in the early 19th century. In 1831, the first Military School was founded in the San Francisco Barracks, an old nunnery. In the next few decades many wars were fought against neighbouring countries. There were also filibusters, hundreds of internal rebellions, and civil wars.

In 1909, the Corporals and Sargeants School was created, aiming to organize the army's troops over the Prussian doctrine. Nearly a decade later, in 1917, the National Military School was created to form cadets and officers for the army which was based in Toncontin, Tegucigalpa.

In 1937, a Machine Gun Corps was established (some 22 years after the British Machine Gun Corps had been established, and 15 years after it had been disestablished), and in 1946 the Basic Weapons School was created. In 1949, a Corporals and Sargeants School was created. Three years later, the General Francisco Morazán Honduran Military Academy was established in Tegucigalpa.

During the 1980s, especially during the tenure of General Gustavo Álvarez Martínez as head of the armed forces, as the Contra War was fought in Nicaragua, the Honduran Army was responsible for a number of human rights violations, especially its Battalion 3-16, trained and supported by the CIA. Said battalion was a specialized intelligence and counter-intelligence unit, formed by hand-picked officers tasked with profiling and capturing those deemed to be traitors, such as supposed communist infiltrators. Human rights groups have deemed Battalion 3-16 as a death squad, attributing more than 100 civilian deaths to it.

By 1983, the army was made up by circa 13.5 thousand soldiers, distributed along three infantry brigades (each made up by two infantry battalions and one artillery battalion), six independent infantry battalions, an armoured cavalry regiment, an engineer battalion, a logistic support command, infantry schools, paratroopers and communications, together with a Combined General Staff with officers from all three branches of the Armed Forces.

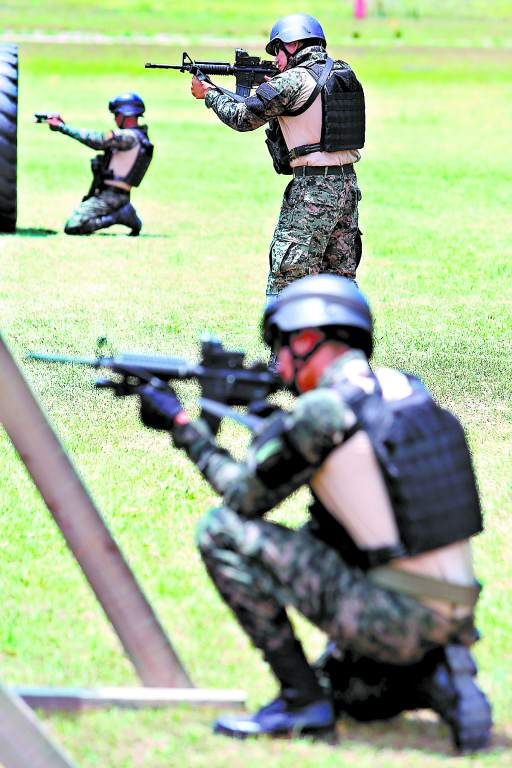
Honduran Army special forces troopers at range practice

=== Peacekeeping ===
The Honduran Army has participated in various humanitarian missions headed by the UN, namely:

- Dominican Republic (DOMREP)
- Haiti (UNMIH)
- Western Sahara (MINURSO)

The Army also sent a battalion to Iraq during the Iraq War, Tarea Xatruch, which made up part of the Plus Ultra Brigade.

== Structure ==
- Army General Command
- Army General Staff
- Army Inspector General
- Army Learning Center
- Combat Units
- Combat Support Service Units

=== Arms ===
The Army's units are divided as follows:

- Combat Units
  - Infantry
  - Cavalry
  - Artillery
  - Engineers
  - Communications
- Combat Support Service Units
  - Logistics
  - Personnel

=== Infantry ===
The infantry is provisioned with an adjustable rifle, bayonet, and survival equipment. They are divided into brigades, which then are divided into battalions, platoons, and squads. Though when the army was formed flintlocks were still the standard infantry weapon, soon Remington rifles were adopted, and then M1 Garands. World War II represented a turning point for Honduran infantry tactics, with the success of American firepower based tactics in Europe.

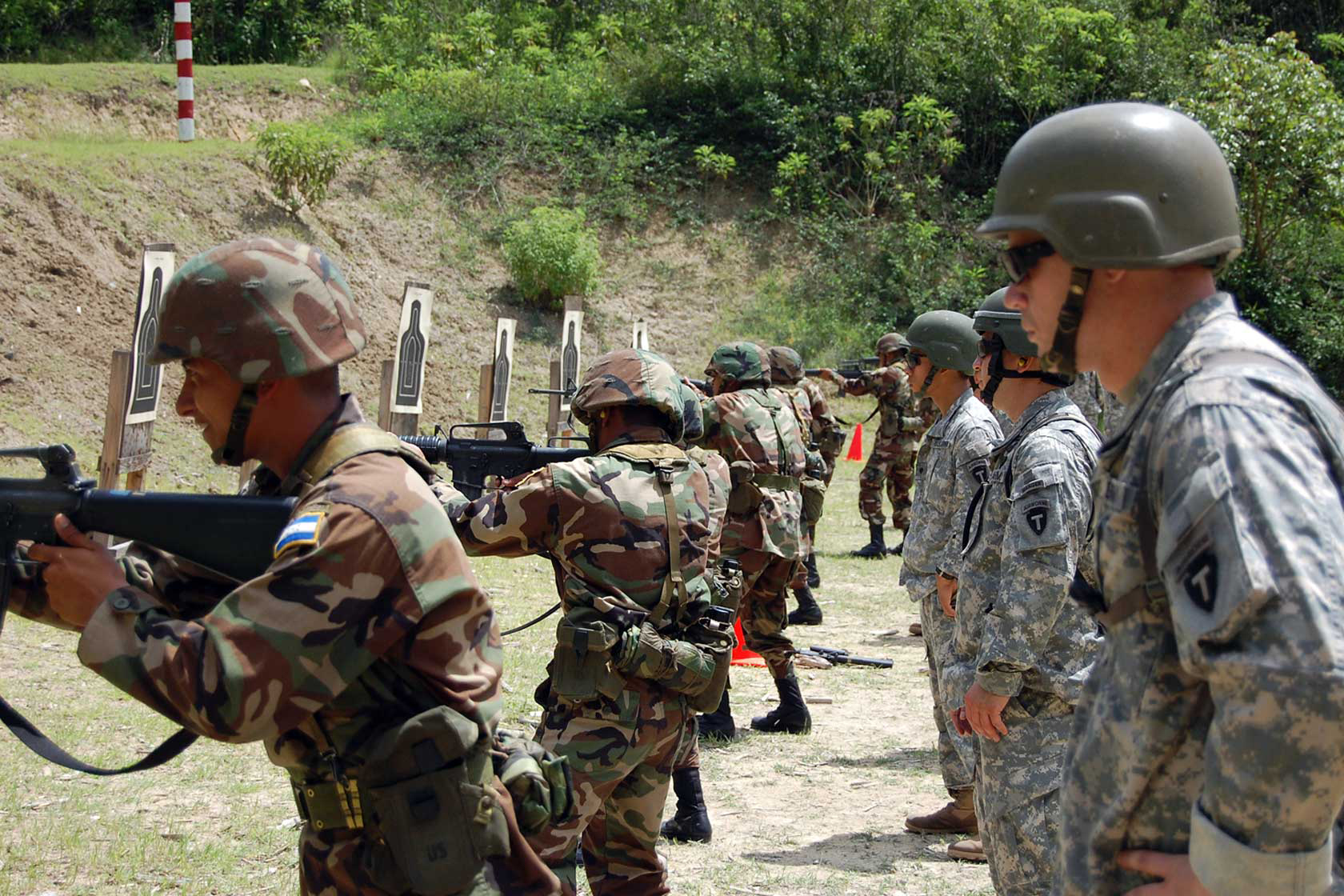
United States trainers from the 36th Infantry Division at target practice with Honduran soldiers

=== Artillery ===
The artillery is the troop charged with the use of mortars, howitzers, rockets, missiles, etc., in offensive or defensive actions; it also is tasked with anti-air defense. The Honduran Army's modern artillery arm dates to 1971, when it was created based on the First Artillery Battalion, a unit which had been formed two years prior around a battery of 75mm guns received from the United States in 1949 and 120mm mortars. Nowadays, there are three battalions of artillery in the Honduran Army.

=== Cavalry ===
Around 1750, a Horse Grenadier Corps was created in the province of Honduras by the Spanish colonial authorities, based in the city of Comayagua, though the Honduran Army's cavalry traces its roots to the Morazán Cavalry, a unit raised by President Francisco Morazán in the 19th century, famed for its mobility and performance in battle. The Army's cavalry was expanded from that unit, and maintained its organization until the end of World War I, which demonstrated the limits of traditional cavalry. Soon, armoured cars and tanks were adopted by the country's cavalry.

The Football War, fought in 1969, demonstrated, however, the limitations of the armoured cavalry model adopted by the Army. In 1977, a new model was adopted where the cavalry was reformed, starting to be reorganized into Mechanized Groups, formed mostly by officers and enlisted men taken from infantry units. The first of these was equipped with 12 RBY Mk 1 Israeli light reconnaissance vehicles. Also in 1977 their designation was switched to Reconnaissance Squadrons, and then, finally, in 1981, they were merged into a single Armoured Cavalry Regiment. That year, some tens of British Scorpion, Sultan and Scimitar armoured vehicles were obtained, and construction started and ended on a base for the regiment, located at the Francisco Morazán Department.

In 1983, tensions with Nicaragua made Army command order the regiment's second squadron into the Valle Department; there, it fought skirmishes against the Salvadoran Army, however. In 1984, some of its tanks were handed to infantry units, in order to bolster their capabilities. That same year, 72 Saladin armoured cars were bought from West Germany, allowing the Army to reorganize its Armoured Cavalry into two regiments, with the second being deployed to the Choluteca Department, bordering Nicaragua.

== Organization ==
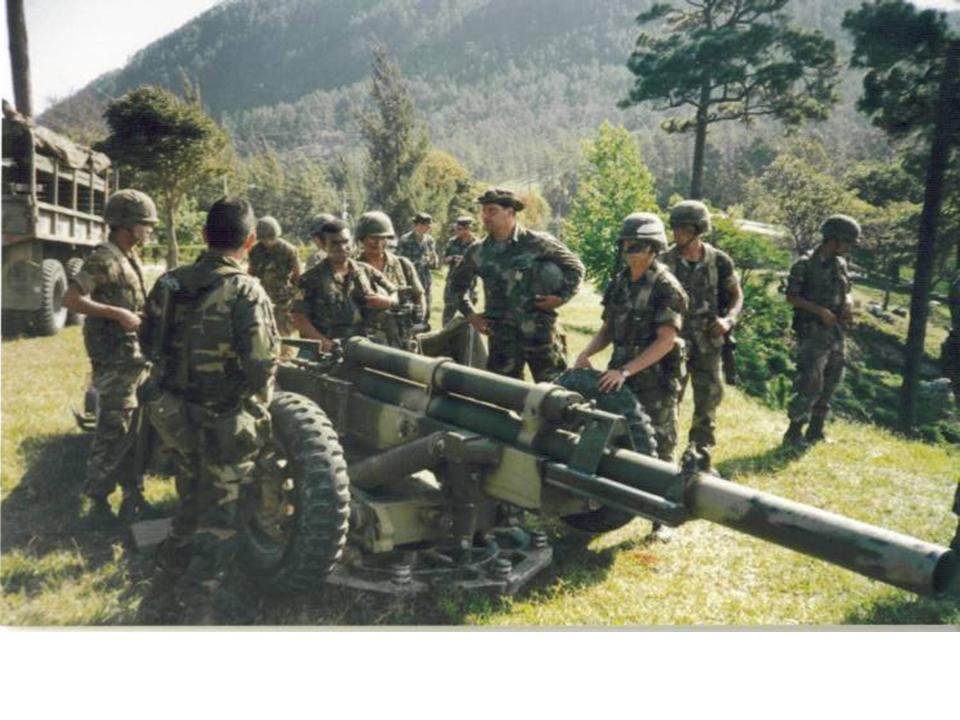
Honduran Army gunners together with United States trainers from the 5-206th Field Artillery in field exercises in the Francisco Morazán Department

- Independent Units:
  - 10th Infantry Battalion
  - 1st Military Engineer Battalion
  - Army Logistical Support Command
- 101st Brigade
  - 11th Infantry Battalion
  - 4th Field Artillery Battalion
  - 1st Armoured Cavalry Regiment
- 105th Brigade
  - 3rd Infantry Battalion
  - 4th Infantry Battalion
  - 14th Infantry Battalion
  - 2nd Field Artillery Battalion
- 110th Brigade
  - 6th Infantry Battalion
  - 9th Infantry Battalion
  - 1st Communications Battalion
- 115th Brigade
  - 5th Infantry Battalion
  - 15th Special Forces Battalion
  - 16th Infantry Battalion
  - Army Military Training Center
- 120th Brigade
  - 7th Infantry Battalion
  - 12th Infantry Battalion
  - 17th Infantry Battalion
- Special Operations Command
  - 1st Infantry Battalion
  - 2nd Infantry Battalion (Special Tactical Group)
  - 1st Field Artillery Battalion
  - 1st Special Forces Battalion

== Equipment ==
=== Armored vehicles ===
Name	Image	Type	Origin	Quantity	Status	Notes
FV101 Scorpion		Light tank	United Kingdom	12		
RBY Mk 1		Reconnaissance vehicle	Israel	10		
Alvis Saladin		Armoured car	United Kingdom	70		
FV107 Scimitar		Reconnaissance vehicle	United Kingdom	3		

=== Artillery ===
Name	Image	Type	Origin	Quantity	Notes
M101 howitzer		Howitzer	United States	24	
M116 howitzer		Howitzer	United States	12	Received from the United States in 1949.
Soltam M-66		Mortar	Israel	24	Originally acquired in 1976.
M29 mortar		Mortar	United States		
Soltam K6		Mortar	Israel		
M2 mortar		Mortar	United States		

=== Anti-tank weapons ===
Name	Image	Type	Origin	Caliber	Notes
Carl Gustav M2		Recoilless rifle	Sweden	84mm	
M18 recoilless rifle		Recoilless rifle	United States	57mm	

=== Infantry Gears ===
Name	Image	Picture	Type	Origin	Notes
Helmet
PASGT			Combat Helmet	United States	
MICH/FAST			Combat Helmet	United States	
M1		N/A	Combat Helmet	United States	
LBE, Combat Vest
ALICE		N/A	LBE	United States	
SPC			Plate carrier	United States	
Combat Uniform
M81 BDU			Combat Uniform	United States	
Army Pixelated Camo	N/A		Camouflage/Combat Uniform	Honduras	

=== Small arms ===
Name	Image	Caliber	Type	Origin	Notes
Pistols
Browning FN-35		9×19mm	Semi-automatic pistol	Belgium	
Machine pistol & Submachine guns
Beretta 93R		9×19mm	Machine pistol	Italy	
Heckler & Koch MP5		9×19mm	Submachine gun	Germany	
Uzi		9×19mm	Submachine gun	Israel	Uzi and Mini-Uzi variants.
Rifles
FN FAL		7.62×51mm	Battle rifle	Belgium	Purchased in the aftermath of the Football War.
Ruger Mini-14		5.56×45mm	Battle rifle	United States	
M14 rifle		7.62×51mm	Battle rifle	United States	
M16 rifle		5.56×45mm	Assault rifle	United States	M16A1 variant.
Machine guns
FN MAG		7.62×51mm	General-purpose machine gun	Belgium	Purchased in the aftermath of the Football War.
M60		7.62×51mm	General-purpose machine gun	United States	
Browning M2		.50 BMG	Heavy machine gun	United States	

== Ranks ==
=== Commissioned officer ranks ===
The rank insignia of commissioned officers.

Rank group	General / flag officers		Senior officers			Junior officers
Honduran Army
Honduran Army	General de división	General de brigada	Coronel	Teniente coronel	Mayor	Capitán	Teniente	Subteniente

=== Other ranks ===
The rank insignia of non-commissioned officers and enlisted personnel.

Rank group	Senior NCOs				Junior NCOs	Enlisted
Honduran Army
Honduran Army	Sargento mayor	Sargento primero	Sargento segundo	Sargento raso	Cabo	Soldado

== See also ==
- List of wars involving Honduras
- Armed Forces of Honduras
