= National Electoral Council (Honduras) =

Highest electoral authority

Logo of the National Electoral Council

The National Electoral Council (Spanish: Consejo Nacional Electoral) is the highest electoral authority, both at the administrative and jurisdictional level in the Republic of Honduras. It was created through constitutional reforms in January 2019, supplanting the previous Supreme Electoral Tribunal (Spanish: Tribunal Supremo Electoral).

The Council alongside the Electoral Justice Tribunal (Spanish: Tribunal de Justicia Electoral) deal with everything related to electoral acts and procedures. Integration, organization and operation are governed by the precepts of the Constitution of Honduras and the Electoral and Political Organizations.

== Budget ==
Insufficient requires of a budget of 700,0000 Lempiras, but only were assigned to it 400 million, but part of this budget has to pay the debt of 125 million purchased during the general elections of 2013, with these actions the government would be undermining Honduras democratic system, since the 2017 primary elections will have a cost of 1,100 million.

== See also ==
- Elections in Honduras
- Primary elections in Honduras
- Politics of Honduras
- Legal history in Honduras
- Government of Honduras
- Supreme Court of Honduras
- National Congress of Honduras
- Constitution of Honduras
- Public Prosecutor's Office (Honduras)
- Executive branch of the government of Honduras
- President of Honduras
