= Támara prison riot =

Deadly 2023 arson and disorder in Honduras

- Part of the Honduran gang crackdown
- Támara prison riot (Honduras)
- Date: 20 June 2023; 3 years ago
- Location: Centro Femenino de Adaptación Social, Támara, Francisco Morazán Department, Honduras; 14°10′52″N 87°20′,48″W
- Type: Prison riot
- Cause: Gang activity
- Participants: female members of MS-13 and the 18th Street gang
- Deaths: 46
- Injuries: 7+

On 20 June 2023, a prison riot broke out in the Women's Center for Social Adaptation, (Note: Spanish: Centro Femenino de Adaptación Social (CEFAS)) a women's prison located in Támara, Honduras, about 29 km (18 mi) northwest from Tegucigalpa, the nation's capital. The riot is suspected to be the result of a conflict between female members of the MS-13 and 18th Street gangs. Forty-six people were killed, with most from a fire that began amid the chaos. The precise circumstances surrounding the incident are currently being investigated.

== Background ==
The Women's Center for Social Adaptation is a women's prison located in Támara, Francisco Morazán Department. At the time, the prison housed between 800 and 900 inmates, double its rated capacity. The prison has been an ongoing scene of cross-gang conflict, particularly between the 18th Street gang and MS-13, deadly archrivals. Killings were increasing in the prison in the years leading up to the riot, with violent incidents being recorded for the first time at the facility in 2020.

Organized crime is a pervasive force in Honduras and is often bolstered by the illegal drug trade. Honduran gangs oftentimes wield immense influence within prisons, where pseudo-economies and rules are often set up by inmates. Conflict between gangs within and between prisons is common, where facilities often place rival gangs in close proximity. In a 2021 report, Human Rights Watch stated that "Overcrowding, inadequate nutrition, poor sanitation, beatings, intra-gang violence, and detainee killings are endemic in [Honduran] prisons." Contraband, such as drugs, pistols, machine guns, and grenades, has been discovered in Honduran prisons. Security forces are often bribed by inmates.

In 2012 in Comayagua, 361 people were killed in the deadliest prison fire ever recorded. In December 2019, 40 inmates were killed in a wave of violence at two all-male Honduran prisons in a single weekend. In May 2020, there had already been a first riot in the correctional facility, where six inmates were murdered, four of them in the gym and two more in section one of the prison, in addition to the fact that several inmates had requested to be transferred to any other penitentiary center, under the reason of receiving serious death threats, which some journalists point out as some alarm that was ignored by the authorities.

== Riot ==
According to Delma Ordóñez, the president of an association for prisoners' families, a brawl broke out between members of rival gangs 18th Street and MS-13. An injured inmate stated that members of the 18th Street gang burst into a cell block and opened fire on other inmates or set them on fire. Most victims were burned to death; some were shot. Images released by local media showed black smoke billowing out of a prison. Public Prosecutor's Office spokesperson Yuri Mora stated that the government could not confirm specifics regarding the incident at the moment.

== Aftermath ==
It was initially announced that at least 41 people died, with authorities warning that the number could increase; it was later raised to 46 deaths. Seven inmates were being treated at a local Tegucigalpa prison. The part of the prison where the riot started was completely destroyed.

Julissa Villanueva, the head of the Honduran prison system, suggested that the riots were caused by recent clampdowns on illicit activity inside the country's prisons. In a televised address following the riot, she said "we will not back down." On Twitter, she declared a state of emergency and announced that firefighters, police, and military forces would intervene. Xiomara Castro, president of Honduras, accused prison security and law enforcement of being complacent and even acquiescing to the rioters, saying on social media that she would "take drastic measures".

In response to the incident, the Honduran government issued two executive decrees, one declaring a state of emergency over the incident, and another one instructing the military to build a maximum security prison in the tiny and remote Swan Islands in the Caribbean Sea, where the heads of gangs and violent prisoners will be transferred.

=== International reactions ===
On Twitter, EU ambassador Jaume Segura expressed condolences and said, "No form of violence against the integral security of people is justifiable" ("Ninguna forma de violencia atentado contra la seguridad integral de las personas es justificable"). Alice Shackelford, UN Resident Coordinator in Honduras, tweeted: "My solidarity with the women in the Penitentiary Center in Támara and my strong rejection of violence" ("Mi solidaridad con las mujeres en el Centro Penitenciario en Támara y mi fuerte rechazo a la violencia"). Also on Twitter, US ambassador to Honduras Laura Dogu expressed condolences and said, "This tragedy exacerbates serious concerns about the security and human rights of all those deprived of liberty" ("Esta tragedia agrava las serias preocupaciones sobre la seguridad y los derechos humanos de todos los privados de libertad").
