= Siege of Comayagua =

Siege of Comayagua may refer to:

- Siege of Comayagua (1827)
- Siege of Comayagua (1845)
