= José Rivas =

José Rivas is the name of:

- José Rivas (fl. 1823), Salvadoran military officer
- José Arturo Rivas (born 1984), Mexican footballer
- José Carlos Rivas (born 1989), Peruvian footballer, see Alianza Lima
- José María Rivas (died 1890), Salvadoran military officer
- José María Rivas (1958–2016), Salvadoran footballer
- José Alejandro Rivas (born 1998), Venezuelan footballer

== See also ==
- José Manuel Suárez Rivas (born 1974), Spanish footballer
