= Battle of Los Llanos de Santa Rosa =

Battle in Central America

- Part of Honduran-Guatemalan War of 1853-1855
Date	February 22, 1852
Location	Santa Rosa de Copán, Honduras
Result	Honduran victory

Combatants
Honduras	Guatemala; El Salvador

Commanders and leaders
(Honduras) José Trinidad Cabañas	(El Salvador) Francisco Dueñas (Guatemala) Rafael Carrera

Strength
(Honduras) 800	(Guatemala) (El Salvador) 2,700

The Battle of Los Llanos de Santa Rosa was fought on February 22 of 1852 between the coalition of the Guatemalan and Salvadoran armies and the Honduran army under the command of José Trinidad Cabañas.

In 1852, under President José Trinidad Cabañas, he led Honduran forces to Los Llanos de Santa Rosa (current day Santa Rosa de Copán to defend the tobacco factory, plantations, and tobacco production against invasions from Guatemalan and Salvadoran armies. Despite being outnumbered (800 vs. 2,700), the Honduran army, led by Cabañas, defeated the combined forces.
