= War of the Priests =

War of the Priests may refer to:

- War of the Priests (Poland), a 15th-century war in Poland
- Guerra de los Padres or War of the Priests, a 19th-century conflict in Honduras
