= Honduran gang crackdown =

Ongoing arrests of alleged gang members in Honduras

- Régimen de Excepción
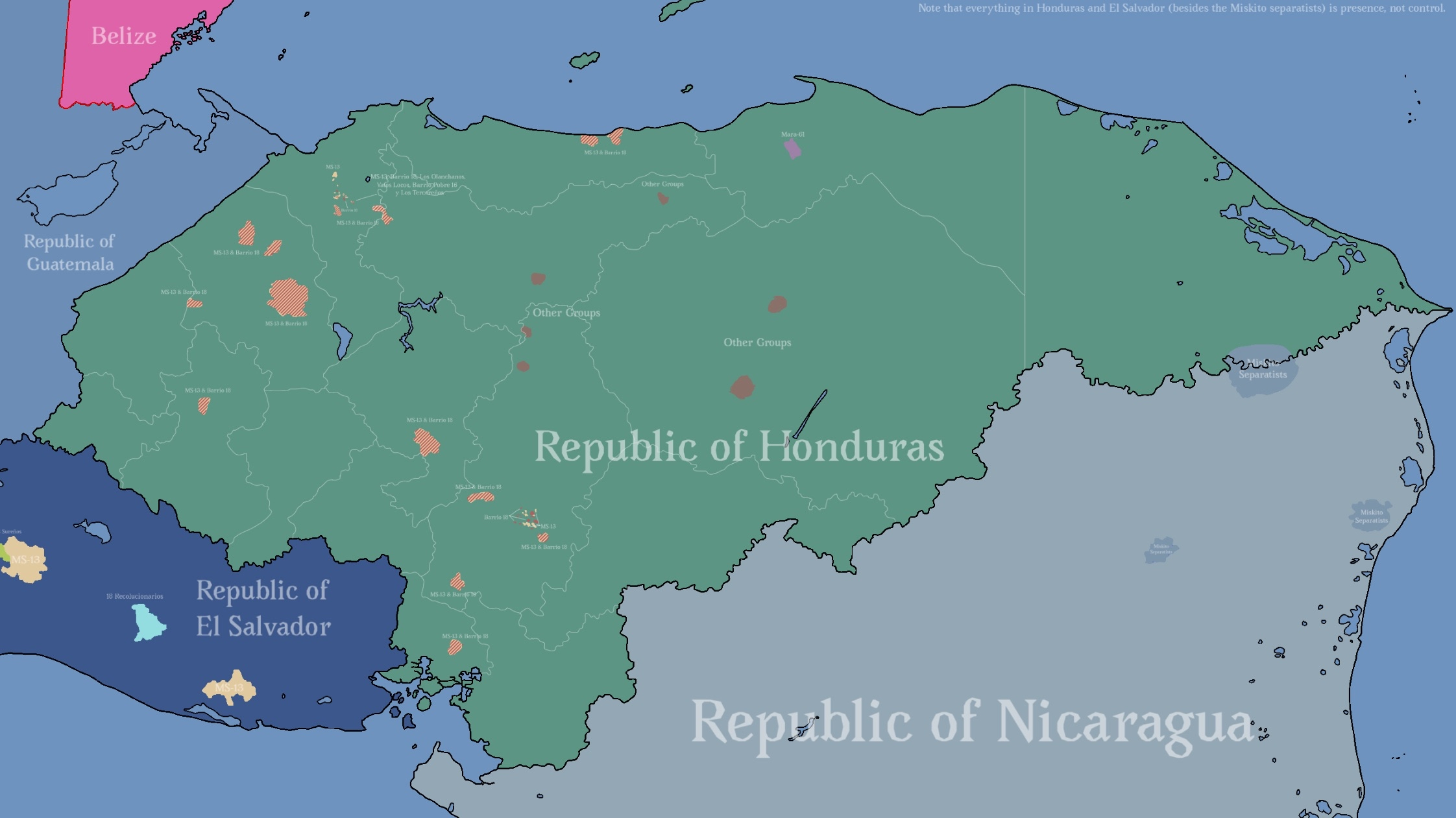
- Map of the Honduras gang crackdown as of 2024
- Date: 6 December 2022 – present; (3 years, 11 months, 2 weeks and 2 days)
- Location: Honduras
- Status: Ongoing

Parties
Criminal gangs; Mara Salvatrucha; 18th Street gang	Honduran government; Armed Forces of Honduras; Honduran Army; Military Police; National Police; DIPAMPCO; United States

Lead figures
Yulan Adonay Archaga Carias	Nasry Asfura; Xiomara Castro; Gustavo Sánchez

Casualties
- Deaths: 100+
- Arrested: 652 (as of 3 February 2023)

The Honduran gang crackdown, referred to in Honduras as the Régimen de Excepción (Spanish for State of Exception), began in December 2022 after parts of the constitution were suspended to fight criminal gangs in the country.

Initially instituted for forty-five days in two municipalities, Tegucigalpa and San Pedro Sula, the state of exception has been renewed and extended to more than half of the country's cities. The government strengthened police resources, built several high-security prisons, authorized the deployment of security forces in the streets, and authorized the deployment of military forces in the streets to support the police.

The homicide rate has fallen from 38 per 100,000 inhabitants in 2022 to 31 in 2023, a drop of 17%. However, according to some specialists, the reduction in crime is not directly linked to the state of emergency.

== Announcement ==
On 24 November 2022, the government of Honduras declared a state of emergency regarding gang violence in the country. On 3 December 2022, the government announced that some constitutional rights would be suspended in the cities of Tegucigalpa and San Pedro Sula to crack down on criminal gangs in those two cities, particularly Mara Salvatrucha (MS-13) and 18th Street Gang. In those cities, the gangs are accused of extorting residents in exchange for protection from violence, and of killing people who refuse to pay. According to Association for a More Just Society, the gangs earn an estimated US$737 million per year through extortion. Gustavo Sánchez, the commissioner of the National Police, stated the state of exception would persist for 30 days.

Xiomara Castro, the president of Honduras, condemned the gangs' use of extortion, stating, "[Extortion] is one of the main causes of insecurity, migration, displacement, loss of freedom, violent deaths and the closure of small and medium-sized businesses. With the comprehensive strategy against extortion and related crimes announced today by the national police, this government of democratic socialism declares war on extortion." According to Leandro Osorio, the former commissioner of the National Police, the crackdown would "carry repressive actions" and would "penetrate" the gangs to capture their leaders. Raúl Pineda Alvarado, a Honduran security analyst, stated that the crackdown would be an "imitation" of a similar gang crackdown in El Salvador which began in March 2022.

In more than half of the country's cities the government strengthened police resources, built several high-security prisons, authorized the deployment of security forces in the streets, and carried out arrests and searches without warrants.

== Crackdown ==
The crackdown began on 6 December 2022 at 6:00 p.m. when 2,000 police officers entered areas controlled by the gangs in Tegucigalpa and San Pedro Sula.

On 8 January 2023, Castro extended the state of exception by 45 days. The state of Emergency was extended on 21 February 2023 and later on 8 April 2023.

On 20 June, at least 46 women were killed in a riot at a women's prison in the town of Támara. From June 24 to 25, thirteen people, 12 men, and 1 woman, were shot dead at a birthday party in the northern manufacturing city of Choloma. At least 11 others were killed in separate incidents across the northern de Sula region in what are assumed to be drug-related killings. Following the incident, the government imposed an immediate 15-day curfew in Choloma between 9 pm and 4 am and another in San Pedro Sula, effective 4 July.

On 15 June 2024, Honduran President Xiomara Castro announced new measures to reduce gang activity in Honduras, including the construction of a 20,000-capacity "megaprison" and plans to designate gang members as terrorists.

On 19 September 2024, two inmates are killed while three others are injured in an attempted jailbreak at a men's prison in Támara.

On 21 May 2026, 19 people were killed in a mass shooting at a ranch in the village of Rigores, Trujillo, Colón Department, Honduras. In a separate incident, six police officers were killed in an ambush in the village of Corinto, Omoa, Cortés Department.

On 21 November, U.S. troops allegedly landed on the Honduran island of Guanaja in a raid against drug traffickers.

== See also ==
- Salvadoran gang crackdown
