= Julissa (given name) =

Julissa is a feminine given name. Notable people with the name include the following:

- Julissa (born Julia Isabel de Llano Macedo in 1944), Mexican actress, producer and singer.
- Julissa (singer) (born Julissa Arce Rivera in 1976), Puerto Rican singer
- Julissa Bermúdez (born 1983), American entertainer
- Julissa Diez (born 1989), Peruvian taekwondoist
- Julissa Ferreras (born 1976), American politician
- Julissa Gomez (1972 – 1991), American gymnast
- Julissa Miró (born 1978), Peruvian model
- Julissa Nolasco, Puerto Rican politician
- Julissa Reynoso (born 1975), American lawyer
- Julissa Veloz (born 1988), American musician
- Julissa Villanueva (born 1972), Honduran scientist
