= Honduran-Salvadoran War of 1845 =

1845 military conflict

First Honduran-Salvadoran War
- Part of Honduran Wars
Date	1845
Location	Honduras and El Salvador
Result	Status Quo Ante Bellum

Combatants
Honduras	El Salvador

Commanders and leaders
(Honduras) Coronado Chavez (Honduras) Francisco Ferrera (Honduras) Jose Santos Guardiola	(El Salvador) Joaquín Eufrasio Guzmán (El Salvador) Jose Trinidad Cabañas (El Salvador) Nicolás Angulo

Strength
(Honduras) 3,000	(El Salvador) 6,000

Casualties and losses
600 killed and wounded	Unknown but heavy

The First Honduran-Salvadoran War was a military conflict between El Salvador and Honduras in 1845.

== Conflict ==
The Salvadoran government, aware of Honduran support for Malespín against Joaquín Eufrasio Guzmán, sought a peaceful resolution. Failed negotiations led to El Salvador questioning Honduras, escalating tensions. Despite diplomatic efforts to preserve peace, preparations for war ensued, with General Cabañas commanding the Salvadoran forces. Tensions escalated further after the Honduran government rejcted the Chinameca agreement.

In late May, General Cabañas invaded Honduras, reaching Comayagua. Salvadoran forces faced defeats in Comayagua, and Sensenti prompting Honduran invasion. President Guzmán declared a state of emergency. Battles ensued in, leading the Honduran occupation of Eastern part of El Salvador, the salvadoran victory in El Obrajuelo led to the Sempul Armistice, broken by the Honduran general Jose Santos Guardiola launching an offensive, capturing La Unión, and San Miguel. Finally he ended up withdrawing and ending the conflict with the Sensenti Peace Agreement on 27 November 1845.

== Chronology of battles ==
- 1845 - Battle of Saco (May 25) - Salvadoran victory
- 1845 - Battle of Santa Rosa (June 8) - Salvadoran victory
- 1845 - Siege of Comayagua (July 2) - Honduran victory
- 1845 - Battle of Los Llanos de Gracias (July 7) - Salvadoran victory
- 1845 - Battle of Sensenti (July 10) - Honduran victory
- 1845 - Battle of La Laguna (July 13) - Honduran victory
- 1845 - Assault on La Unión (1845) (July 18)- Honduran victory
- 1845 - Battle of Monterredondo (August 14)- Honduran victory
- 1845 - Battle of La Hacienda de El Obrajuelo (August 15)- Salvadoran victory
- 1845 - Battle of La Unión (August 19) - Salvadoran victory
- 1845 - Assault on La Unión (August 18) - Honduran victory

== See also ==
- El Salvador–Honduras relations
