= Cordero's Expedition =

War in Central America

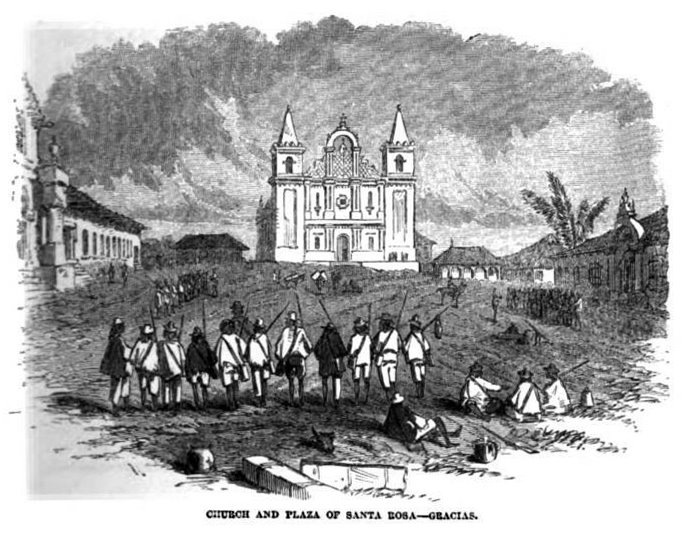
| Date | 1838 |
| Location | Honduras |
| Result | Honduran victory: Defeat of Guatemalan forces |

Combatants
| Honduras | Guatemala |

Commanders and leaders
| (Honduras) Ciriaco Braan y Carrascosa (Honduras) Eusebio Toro (Honduras) José Trinidad Cabañas | (Guatemala) Indalecio Cordero |

Strength
| (Honduras) 107 | (Guatemala) 300 |

Casualties and losses
| 9 killed | 13 killed 33 wounded 56 prisoners Total: 102 Casualties |

Cordero's Expedition was an unsuccessful expedition by the Guatemalan commander, Indalecio Cordero in 1838.

In 1838, once the State of Honduras had been declared, the Guatemalan general Indalecio Cordero, of republican ideology, attacked western Honduras and took the town of Santa Rosa de Los Llanos while a transition occurred in the Honduran presidency between José María Martinez Salinas and José Lino Matute. In response, the unionist general José Trinidad Cabañas immediately ordered the movement of troops, commanded by General Eusebio Toro and General Ciriaco Braan y Carrascosa, for the defense of the inhabitants and their properties. After General Cordero was cornered, he retreated to Guatemala, defeated. 300 soldiers of the Guatemalan army invaded Honduras, but the liberal forces of José Trinidad Cabañas, composed of 107 soldiers plus two officers, stopped the invasion, which caused a victory for the Honduran Army, the first in its history.
