= Siege of Comayagua (1845) =

- Part of Honduran-Salvadoran War of 1845
Date	July 2, 1845
Location	Comayagua, Honduras
Result	Honduran decisive victory: Total defeat of the Salvadoran forces

Combatants
Honduras	El Salvador

Commanders and leaders
(Honduras) José Santos Guardiola	(El Salvador) José Trinidad Cabañas

Strength
(Honduras) 400	(El Salvador) 1,400–1,600

Casualties and losses
Unknown	(El Salvador) 500 killed

The siege of Comayagua was a military engagement during the Honduran-Salvadoran War of 1845 in which Salvadoran forces under the command of José Trinidad Cabañas laid siege to the Honduran capital of Comayagua

General Cabañas invaded the territory of Honduras in the last days of May, with a force of between 1,400 and 1,600 soldiers, and without encountering difficulty he reached Comayagua, then capital of that Republic; but having been attacked by the forces under the command of General Guardiola numbering 400 soldiers, the Salvadorans suffered a defeat, and many of them were immolated without mercy to the wrath of the victor. The brave Cabañas made the last charge with five officers to encourage the withdrawal of his troops, and upon returning to Salvador he asked that a War Council be formed to justify himself, since the withdrawal of the Salvadorans was due to word having spread of having been cut by the Hondurans.
