= El Salvador–Honduras border =

International border

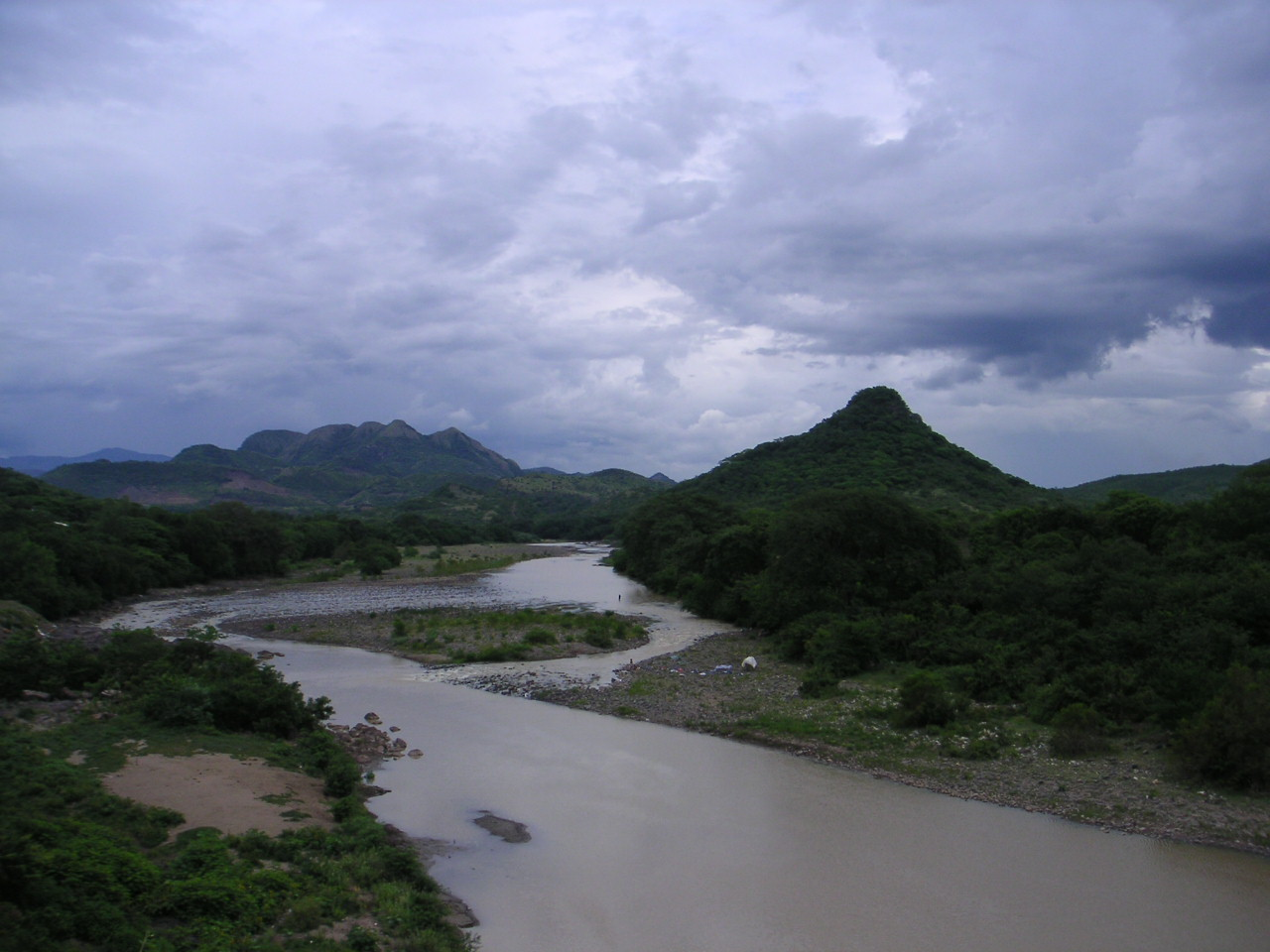
A river at the border between the countries.

The El Salvador–Honduras border is a continuous line of 256 km long, separating the east and the north of El Salvador from the territory of Honduras. There are two excerpts:

- South–north direction, running from the coast of Pacific Ocean, Gulf of Fonseca, going to the beginning of the east–west stretch.
- East–west direction, leaving the north–south stretch, going to the triple border El Salvador - Honduras - Guatemala.

The border runs alongside the Salvadoran departments of Chalatenango, Cabañas, San Miguel, Morazán, La Union and the Honduran departments of Valle, La Paz, Intibucá, Lempira and Ocotepeque. Passes at the highest point of the territory of El Salvador, the Cerro El Pital.

The limit was first set in 1841 when the two countries were part of the Federal Republic of Central America along with Nicaragua. In 1856, the three countries separated by setting the current international borders.

== See also ==
- El Salvador–Honduras relations
- El Salvador–Guatemala border
