= El Salvador–Honduras relations =

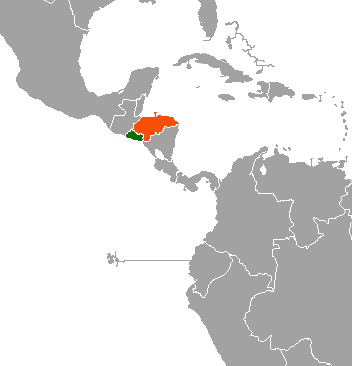

- El Salvador: Honduras

El Salvador and Honduras have long-standing bilateral and historical relations, owing to a shared history in the Spanish Empire. El Salvador has an embassy in Tegucigalpa and consulates in Choluteca and San Pedro Sula. Honduras has an embassy in San Salvador. Both countries are members of the Central American Integration System, Community of Latin American and Caribbean States, Organization of American States, and the Organization of Ibero-American States.

== See also ==
- El Salvador–Honduras border
- Foreign relations of El Salvador
- Foreign relations of Honduras
- Football War
- Honduran-Salvadoran War of 1871
- Honduran-Salvadoran War of 1845
