= RBY Mk 1 =

RBY MK 1
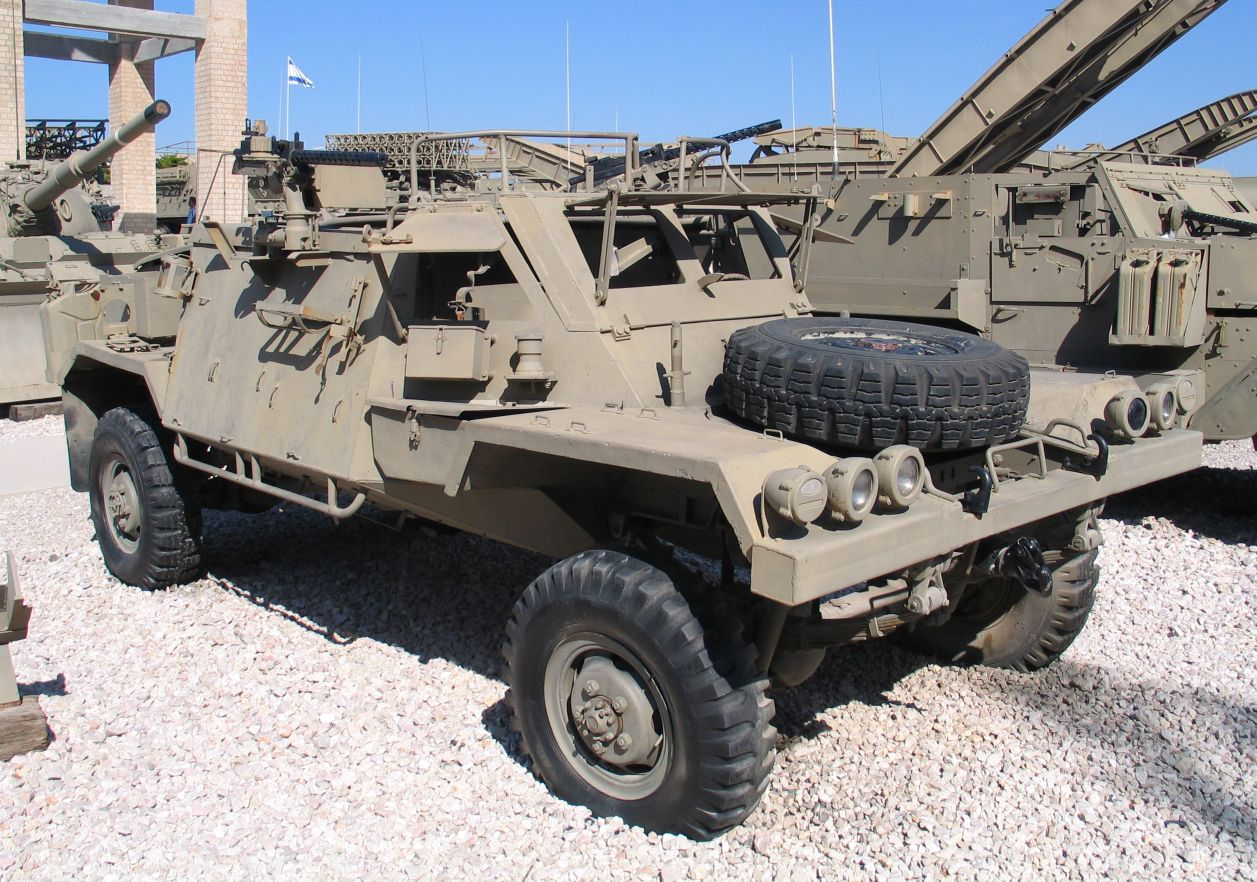
- RBY MK I at the Yad la-Shiryon Museum, Israel.
- Type: Reconnaissance vehicle
- Place of origin: Israel

Service history
- In service: 1975-present
- Used by: See Operators
- Wars: Guatemalan Civil War; FMLN-Honduran skirmish South Lebanon conflict (1985–2000)

Production history
- Designer: IAI RAMTA
- Designed: 1975
- Produced: 1975

Specifications
- Mass: 3600 kg
- Length: 5.023 m (16.48 ft)
- Width: 2.030 m (6.66 ft)
- Height: 1.660 m (5.45 ft)
- Crew: 2 (+6 passengers)
- Armour: 8 mm (0.31 in) steel (hull sides); 10 mm (0.39 in) steel (floor)
- Main armament: Up to 5 machine guns (pintle mounts)
- Engine: Chrysler 225-2 6-cylinder petrol; 6.8 litre V-8 diesel (Guatemalan RBY Mk 1 only); Deutz BT6L 912S inline-V6 diesel engine (Honduran local upgrade) 120 hp or 145 hp depending on variant
- Power/weight: Depends on Variant
- Maximum speed: 100 km/h (62 mph)

The RBY Mk 1 is a light armoured reconnaissance vehicle that was produced by the RAMTA Division of Israel Aircraft Industries. RBY is an anglicized acronym for "Rechev Ben-Yaacov". "Rechev" is Hebrew for "vehicle" and "Ben-Yaacov" is the last name of the creator of the vehicle, Yitzchak Ben-Yaacov (1919–2011).

In Israel, the vehicle is known as the "Rabi", a pronunciation of the acronym. It was replaced in Israeli service by the RAMTA RAM 2000 family of vehicles, though it continues to be used and upgraded by foreign users.

The RBY Mk 1 is no longer marketed to new customers. It was known to be sold at $60,000.

== History ==
RAMTA created the RBY MK 1 in the 1970s to increase the IDF's access to utility type vehicles and then sold them to countries, on a tight budget, that wanted such vehicles. By 1979, RAMTA has switched production from the RBY MK 1 to the RAM vehicles.

== Design ==
The RBY Mk 1 with a variety of potential applications in mind, including reconnaissance, commando operations, internal security, and long range patrols.

Considerable design effort was put into making the vehicle mine resistant - the wheels and axles were placed as far forward and backward as possible to maximize the distance of any detonation away from the crew and passengers, the bumpers were made of fiberglass so they would disintegrate in an explosion and minimize hazardous debris, the thickest armour was incorporated into the floor, and the floor and hull were shaped to channel explosions away from the vehicle. Other than modified Guatemalan versions, the RBY Mk 1 had no doors (crew entered through the open-topped passenger compartment) to ensure that the hull had no weak points.

The weight of the vehicle was kept light enough to make it transportable by heavy lift helicopters, such as the Sikorsky CH-53 Sea Stallion.

While the RBY Mk 1 featured no integral armament, provisions were made for up to five machine guns by placing pintle mounts at various points around the vehicle.

Passenger seating was provided with two back-to-back rows of three outward-facing seats. This allowed the passengers to maintain a full 360 degree field of view and operate any mounted machine guns.

=== Guatemalan upgrades ===
In the mid-to-late 1990s, the Guatemalan Army began testing an upgraded and modified RBY MK 1. The new RBY MK 1 featured a new, more powerful diesel engine, a kevlar roof for what had been the open cargo/passenger box, and access doors on either side of the vehicle for the now-enclosed rear compartment. The roof incorporated a ring mount for a machine gun.

== Variants ==
Recoilless rifle version
modified version of the RBY Mk 1 was produced which featured a 106mm recoilless rifle, 16 rounds of ammunition and crew positions in place of the normal passenger seating.

Anti-tank version
RBY Mk 1 with TOW missile launcher and two 7.62mm machine guns.

Anti-aircraft version
Armed with dual 20mm light anti-aircraft guns and 360 rounds of ammo.

APC version
Vehicle with three 7.62mm machine guns on turrets.

Mortar version
Vehicle with compartment for a mortar.

RAM MK3

== Operators ==
=== Current ===
- Cameroon - armed with TCM-20 anti-aircraft gun
- Guatemala: 10
- Honduras: 8 RBY Mk 1 Recce and 8 RBY Mk 1 AT. The Honduran Army used them on 29 April 1983 after Salvadoran rebels of the Farabundo Martí National Liberation Front crossed the border.
- Lesotho: 10
- Venezuela: 10 - armed with TCM-20 AA guns and locally repowered

=== Former ===
- Israel
- South Lebanon Army

== See also ==
"Combat Reconnaissance/Patrol Vehicle" with rear engine:

- Fennek – (Germany)
- D-442 FÚG – (Hungarian People's Republic)
- ABC-79M – (Romania)
- BRDM-2 – (Soviet Union)
- Textron Tactical Armoured Patrol Vehicle – (Canada)

Others:

- RG-31 Nyala – (South Africa) - A more modern mine protected vehicle
- MRAP - A type of vehicle designed to survive mine attacks and improvised explosive devices

== Bibliography ==
- Kassis, Samer (2003). 30 Years of Military Vehicles in Lebanon. Beirut: Elite Group. ISBN 9953-0-0705-5.
- Sex, Zachary; Abi-Chahine, Bassel (2021). Modern Conflicts 2 – The Lebanese Civil War, From 1975 to 1991 and Beyond. Modern Conflicts Profile Guide. Vol. II. AK Interactive. EAN 8435568306073.
