= National Police of Honduras =

Agency overview
- Formed: 5 January 1888

Jurisdictional structure
- Operations jurisdiction: Honduras
- General nature: Civilian police

The National Police of Honduras (founded 5 January 1888) is the uniformed police force of the Republic of Honduras. The force is organised into regional headquarters, municipal headquarters, headquarters of fixed or mobile stations, and police posts. There are at least 360 police centres throughout Honduras. The National Police of Honduras has its headquarters in Tegucigalpa, the capital city of Honduras. The National Police of Honduras is the fourth largest police body in Central America by number of employees (more than Costa Rica, Nicaragua and Belize). It is the sixth largest force in Central America by police officers per capita. The force's patroness is the Virgin of Carmen. On 16 July of each year the "National Police Patroness Day" is celebrated.

== History ==
=== Origins ===
In 1866, the ruling general in Honduras, José María Medina made the "Law of Rural Police". A group of men were given powers similar to those of a Justice of the peace. This group of officers was later called the "Body of the Gendarmerie".

In December 1881, the president of the republic, Marco Aurelio Soto, instituted the "Police of the Line" in Tegucigalpa and Comayagüela. There was a Commandant, a sub-commander, an assistant, four sergeants, and five policemen.

On 15 January 1882, by order of President Marco Aurelio Soto, the National Police of Honduras was established. On 14 September 1888, the acting president, General Luis Bográn, issued a decree that a port police unit be formed. The new unit became operational on 1 January 1890.

In the 1930s, the first National Directorate of Criminal Investigation was formed and in 1933, a division of traffic policing was created.

=== Military rule ===
In 1957, government and military relations in Honduras began to deteriorate. In June 1959, the National Police of Honduras was replaced by the "Civil Guard", a paramilitary force with policing duties.

The 1963 Honduran coup d'état led by Colonel Arming Velásquez Cerrato and Oswaldo López Arellano removed President Ramón Villeda Morales from power. On 9 October 1963, the Special Security Corps (CES) was formed by Chief of State Arellano. The first director of the CES was General Alonzo Flores Guerra. Rural and highway patrol units were formed. In 1969, during the Football War (conflict between Honduras and El Salvador), the CES fought on the side of the Honduras army. In 1974, a unit for the policing of inland revenue was created.

On 30 January 1975, the CES was disbanded and "FUSEP", a public security force, was formed as a branch of the military. The officers of FUSEP were outfitted in green uniforms and armed with regulation 9mm Browning Hi-Power pistols and FN FAL (Rifle Automatique Léger) 7.62×51mm calibre NATO rifles.

=== Return to civil governance ===
From 1982, Honduras returned to civil rule and the police force was to be separated from the military. However, at the time, the police force kept some military characteristics. It operated under the auspices of the Office of National Defense and Public Security (SDNSP) and under the authority of the director of the FFAA, who was a representative of the president.

There was continuation of a National Directorate of Investigation (DNI). The commander-in-chief, a general, was a graduate of the General José Trinidad Cabañas National Police Academy of Honduras (ANAPO), and sometimes of the National Police University of Honduras (UNPH). On 4 January 1982, the Captain José Santos Guardiola Centre for Police Instruction (CIP-CJSG) (the Police Technical Institute (ITP-CJSG)) was established. In July 1984, the School for Qualification of Police Officials (ECOP) ("Upper Institute of Police Education" (ISEP)) was established.

In 1993, a new division, the Directorate General of Criminal Investigation (DGIC) was created. On 17 December 1996, by Decree Number 229-96, Congress ordered the transfer of the police force to civil control. The governing body was a board chaired by Hernán Corrales Padilla. The board members were lawyers Jorge Ponce Turcios, Francisco Cardona Argüelles, Germán Leitzelar Vidaurreta, Felipe Elvir Sierra, José Zamora Bados, and the engineer, Alfredo Landaverde.

On 28 May 1998, by Decree Number 156-98, the "Organic Law of the National Police" (LOPN) was created. The governing civil body was the Secretariat of State in the Dispatch of Security. The decree was administered by Hernán Corrales Padilla (1924 - 1999).

On 22 May 2012, the General Director of the Honduran National Police, Juan Carlos Bonilla Valladares, known as "El Tigre" was appointed. On 19 December 2013, Valladares left office, replaced by Ramón Antonio Sabillón Pineda.

In 1997, during the presidency of Carlos Roberto Reina, the Fuerza de Seguridad Pública, FUSEP (public security force) changed to civilian governance.

In 1998, the president, Carlos Roberto Flores, and the National Congress of Honduras, passed legislation that would establish a new National Police of Honduras. The new force was formed by 2001.

=== Accusations of involvement in drug trafficking ===
On April 30, 2020, DEA Special Operations Division Special Agent in Charge Wendy Woolcock and United States Attorney for the Southern District of New York Geoffrey S. Berman charged former chief of Honduran National Police Juan Carlos Bonilla Valladares, aka “El Tigre,” in a Manhattan federal court with drug trafficking and weapons offenses involving the use and possession of machineguns and destructive devices. Woolcock claimed that during his time of the chief of police, “Juan Carlos Bonilla Valladares allegedly used his high ranking position to influence those working for him and violently protect the politically connected drug traffickers who would smuggle cocaine destined for the United States.” It was revealed that Honduran law enforcement officials, as well as politicians, had been working with numerous drug traffickers in Honduras since 2003.

== Organisation ==
The National Police of Honduras operates under the legal framework of the "Organic Law of the National Police". Article 293 of the Constitution of Honduras by Decree 136-1995 and Decree 229-1996 in addition to Article 22 of its Organic Law by Decree No. 67-200815 defines the work of the National Police.

The National Police of Honduras is governed by the office of the Director General of the National Police (DGPN). There is oversight by the Office of Security (one of sixteen secretariats of the Executive Branch of the government) headed by the Minister of Security.

In 2010, the Office of Security operated with a budget of Lps. 3,129,454,629 (US$165.143 million). The main division of the force, the "Dirección Nacional de la Policía Preventiva", DNPP (preventive policing unit) had the highest expenditure at about Lps. 1.333.687.852 (US$70.3 million).

The National Police of Honduras has six divisions or "National Directorates". They are:

- "Dirección Nacional de la Policía Preventiva", DNPP (preventive policing unit)
- "Dirección Nacional de Investigación Criminal", DNIC (criminal investigation unit)
- "Dirección Nacional de Servicios Especiales de Investigación", DNSEI (investigative special services unit)
- "Dirección Nacional de Tránsitos", DNT (traffic policing unit)
- "Dirección Nacional de Servicios Especiales Preventivos", DNSEP (preventive special services unit)
- "Sistema de Educación Policial", SEP (police education unit)

The SEP includes four units: the National Police University of Honduras (UNPH), the Police Technological Institute (ITP), the National Police Academy (ANAPO) and the School of Sub-Officers (ESO).

=== Dirección Nacional de la Policía Preventiva ===
The DNPP combats crimes related to organized crime, such as smuggling, fraud or tax evasion and implements police controls on taxes. It combats the production, use, possession and illegal trafficking of arms and drugs. It enforces the legal order of transportation, transit and roads, and exercises security functions in immigration matters.

The DNPP is managed by officers with a degree in Police Science. The officers receive an undergraduate degree from the National Police University of Honduras (UPNH), and the rank of Sub-Inspector of Police. The uniforms, patrol cars, Galil pistols and regulation rifles of the officers are colored blue. The division also has "Falcon" Bell 206 JetRanger helicopters at their disposal in an air unit.

=== Dirección Nacional de Investigación Criminal ===
The DNIC was developed with training and instructors from Scotland Yard (UK), Federal Bureau of Investigation and Drug Enforcement Administration (US), and Mossad (Israel). This unit utilizes regulation weapons including the 9mm calibre Glock, the Remington shotgun, and the IMI Galil rifle. A Director General and a representative of the Public Ministry of Honduras work together as heads of the DNIC. A forensic physician from the Faculty of Forensic Sciences is associated with the DNIC.

Within the DNIC unit is the DGIC unit (DPI). It drafts eighteen-year-old men and women who have just completed secondary or university education to become detectives. The head of the unit is an officer of the rank of commissioner or an inspector.

Each unit also has agents who are crime scene technicians, crime scene investigators, violent crime scene technicians, analysts, ballistic analysts, specialists in reconstruction, field inspection, computer crime, drug related crime and graphics and drafting.

=== Special units ===
==== Comando de Operaciones Especiales (COECO) ====
The Comando de Operaciones Especiales COECO ("special operations command" or "Cobras") are an elite unit of Honduran police agents skilled in managing riots and disturbances, sniper shooting, and tactical and special operations. The unit trains with American SWAT units.

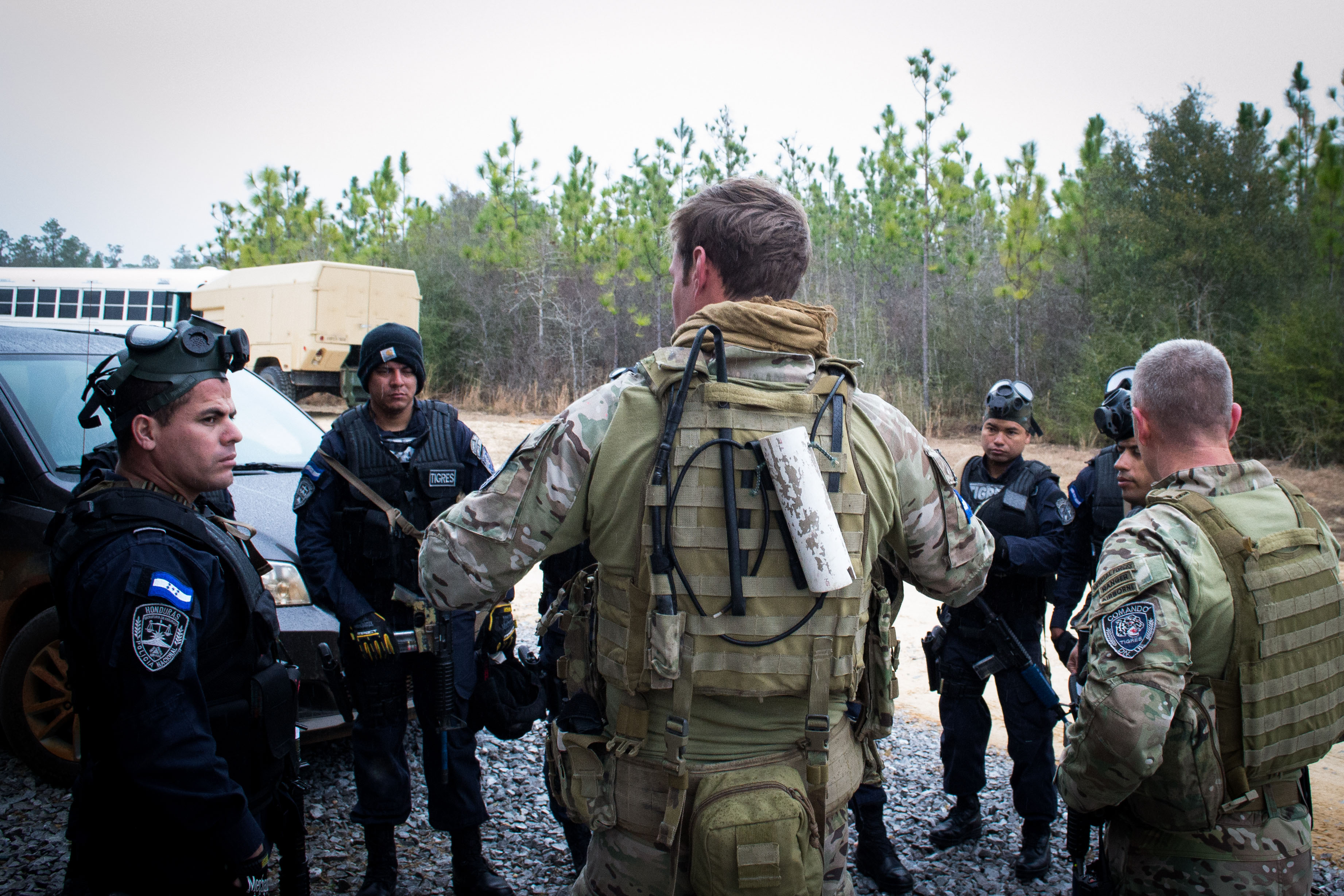
TIGRES training with U.S. 7th Special Forces Group

==== Tropa de Inteligencia y Grupos de Respuesta Especial de Seguridad (TIGRES) ====
On 26 July 2012, legislation was passed for the creation of the TIGRES, "Intelligence Troop and Special Security Response Groups" or "Tigers". The TIGRES counters organized crime and hooliganism, in conjunction with judges and public prosecutors. The TIGERS are trained for several months by instructors from the US Army Special Forces and members of the JUNGLAS unit of the Colombian National Police, with the support of the US government.

==== Direccion Policial de Investigacion ====
On 1 September 2015, President Juan Orlando Hernández formally opened a new police investigation unit, the DPI. The DPI works in regional headquarters including San Pedro Sula, La Ceiba, Santa Rosa de Copán, Comayagua and Choluteca.

== Police deaths ==
Crime in Honduras is related to social instability, an increase in gangs, and youth unemployment, and availability of firearms. Below is a brief list of police officers who have lost their lives in the line of duty.

- Héctor Cerrato aged 40, died when confronting armed assailants inside a police bus.
- On 9 January 2013, Suyapa Posed Martinez was shot in Colonia Villa Olímpica when his weapon was stolen.
- On 4 April 2013, Robin Fernando Espinal Ponce and officer of the National Direction of Criminal Investigation (D.N.I.C.), died while trying to detain two men who attacked a "rapidito" police bus in the Guadeloupe neighbourhood of San Pedro Sula.
- On 7 August 2013, Joaquín Santos Arita aged 41, was a member of the traffic branch who was shot while on routine work in the Boulevard Centroamérica. The gunmen, José Edwin Mejía Bautista and José Edgardo González Aguilera, were arrested.
- On 21 October 2009, David Orlando Romero Bengston aged 21, who worked at the metropolitan head office number two in San Pedro Sula, was on vacation in his home town of El Progreso, Yoro when he was kidnapped and later shot on the road leading to Tela.

== See also ==
- Armed forces of Honduras
- Honduran Air Force
- Public ministry of Honduras
