= José Santiago Bueso =

President of Honduras

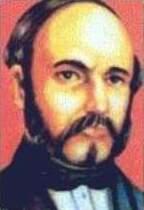

José Santiago Bueso (1815–1857) was President of Honduras from 18 October to 8 November 1855.

He served as Vice President of Honduras in the cabinet of José Trinidad Cabañas from 1852 to 1855.
