= Elections in Honduras =

Honduras holds elections for a head of state and a legislature. The country's head of state, the president, is elected by the people for a four-year term by a simple majority of valid votes (null and blank ballots excluded). All members of the National Congress (Congreso Nacional) are also elected by the people. The unicameral National Congress has 128 members (diputados), elected for four-year terms by proportional representation to represent the country's various departments. Honduras' presidential elections are held on the last Sunday of November of the election year.

Honduras has a multi-party system. Historically, the political system functioned as a two-party system dominated by the Liberal Party of Honduras (PLH) and the National Party of Honduras (PNH). Ahead of the 2013 general election, several new parties emerged as contenders for political power and influence.

Constitutional rules governing presidential re-election were altered after a 2015 ruling by the Supreme Court of Honduras.

== Primary elections of Honduras ==
Primary elections in Honduras are mechanisms by which the political parties of the country choose their presidential candidates. They are held during the third year in office of the current government. These primary elections are not compulsory, nor paid for by the state. The electoral high court of Honduras regulates this process, and the National Register of the People is an organism of support that gives legitimacy to the electoral process.

== General elections of Honduras ==
General elections in Honduras are held during the fourth year in office of the government, some months before finalising the government's mandate and a year after the primary elections that chose the presidential candidates of each political party. In them they renew the holders of the offices of popular election of the Republic of Honduras.

== Schedule ==
=== Election ===
Position	2009	2010	2011	2012	2013	2017	2021	2025
Type	Presidential (November); National Congress (November); Gubernatorial (November)	None			Presidential (November); National Congress (November); Gubernatorial (November); Central American Parliament(November)	Presidential (November); National Congress (November); Central American Parliament(November); Mayoral (November)		
President and vice president	President and vice president	None			President and vice president	President and vice president		
National Congress	All seats	None			All seats	All seats		
Provinces, cities and municipalities	All positions	None			All positions	All positions		
Central American Parliament	All seats	None			All seats	All seats		

=== Inauguration ===
Position	2010	2011	2012	2013	2014	2018	2022
Type	Presidential (January); National Congress (January); Gubernatorial (January)	None			Presidential (January); National Congress (January); Gubernatorial (January); Central American Parliament (January)	Presidential (January); National Congress (January); Central American Parliament (January); Mayoral (January)	
President and vice president	27 January	None			27 January	27 January	
National Congress	27 January	None			27 January	27 January	
Provinces, cities and municipalities	27 January	None			27 January	27 January	
Central American Parliament	27 January	None			27 January	27 January	

== Recent elections ==
=== 2009 Presidential and parliamentary elections ===
Disputed in the wake of the 2009 Honduran constitutional crisis.

== Electoral reforms ==
The Constitution of Honduras historically prohibited presidential re-election. In 2015, the Supreme Court of Honduras ruled that the constitutional prohibition on re-election was inapplicable, allowing incumbents to run again for the presidency.

== See also ==
- Politics of Honduras
- Honduras
- Primary elections in Honduras
- Legal history in Honduras
- Government of Honduras
- Supreme Court of Honduras
- National Congress of Honduras
- Constitution of Honduras
- Public Prosecutor's Office (Honduras)
- President of Honduras
