= Legislation of Honduras =

The Republic of Honduras has had a considerable number of constitutional codes through its history.

== Constitutions ==
During the pre-independence period the province of Honduras was governed under the 1808 Constitution of Bayonne.

- Constitution of 1812 (Constitution of Cádiz), valid from 1812 to 1814 and from 1820 to 1823
- Bases of Federal Constitution of 1823, valid 1823 to 1824
- 1824 Constitution of the Federal Republic of Central America

=== Constitution as State of Honduras ===
- Constitution of the State of Honduras of 1825
- Constitution of the State of Honduras of 1831
- Constitution of the State of Honduras of 1839
- Constitution of Honduras of 1848

=== Constitutions as Republic of Honduras ===
- Constitution of Honduras of 1865
- Constitution of Honduras of 1873
- Constitution of Honduras of 1880
- Constitution of Honduras of 1894
- Constitution of Honduras of 1904
- Constitution of the Federal Republic of Centroamérica of 1921
- Constitution of Honduras of 1924
- Constitution of Honduras of 1936
- Constitution of Honduras of 1957
- Constitution of Honduras of 1965
- Constitution of Honduras of 1982

== Codes ==
Honduran law belongs to the family of the Rights romanistas, derived from Common law. Initially it was formed by norms of Indigenous law and of Castilian law. Its codification was initiated by the liberal governments from the decade of 1880.

== Civil law ==
- Siete Partidas (Seven-part Code) of Don Alfonso X the Wise
- Civil code of Honduras of 1880
- Civil code of Honduras of 1899
- Civil code of Honduras of 1906

== Penal law ==
- Siete Partidas of Alfonso X of Castile
- Penal code of Honduras of 1880
- Penal code of Honduras of 1899
- Penal code of Honduras of 1895
- Penal code of Honduras of 1906
- Penal code of Honduras of 1984

== Civil procedural law ==
- Siete Partidas of Don Alfonso X the Wise
- Code of Civil Procedures of Honduras of 1881
- Code of Procedures of Honduras of 1899
- Code of Procedures of Honduras of 1906
- Procedural code Civilian of Honduras of 2007

== Penal procedural law ==
- Siete Partidas of Don Alfonso X the Wise
- Code of Procedures of Honduras of 1899
- Code of Criminal Instruction of Honduras of 1904
- Penal Procedural code of Honduras of 1985
- Penal Procedural code of Honduras of 1999

== Commercial law ==
- Ordenanzas Of Bilbao (1793)
- Code of Trade of Honduras of 1880
- Code of Trade of Honduras of 1899
- Code of Trade of Honduras of 1940
- Code of Trade of Honduras of 1950

== Labour law ==
- Code of the Work of Honduras of 1959

== Specific laws ==
- Law of Organisation and Attributions of the Courts
- Law of the Social Insurance of Honduras

== See also ==
- Politics of Honduras
- Honduras
- Elections in Honduras
- Primary elections in Honduras
- General elections in Honduras – Presidential
- Politics of Honduras
- Government of Honduras
- Supreme Court of Honduras
- National Congress of Honduras
- Constitution of Honduras
- Public Prosecutor's Office (Honduras)
- Executive branch of the government of Honduras
- President of Honduras
