= Honduran–Guatemalan War =

Honduran-Guatemalan War (1853-1855)
Date	1853–1855
Location	Honduras and Guatemala
Result	Guatemalan victory

Combatants
Guatemala (Honduras) Political opponents	Honduras

Commanders and leaders
(Guatemala) Rafael Carrera (Guatemala) José Víctor Zavala (Honduras) José Santos Guardiola (Honduras) Juan López	(Honduras) José Trinidad Cabañas (Honduras) José María Medina

The Honduran-Guatemalan War was a military conflict between the republics of Honduras and Guatemala sparked by the election of José Trinidad Cabañas, which opposed to the conservative ideologies of the guatemalan president, Rafael Carrera.

== Conflict ==
The war began in February 1853, with negotiations attempting to resolve the conflict. Cabañas organized two divisions and went to establish his headquarters in Gracias On May 24 (1853), the 200 soldiers he commanded deserted him; but this did not deter him, because realizing that the intrigue was trying to defeat him, he shot four officers he considered accomplices and with only 70 men, a number that increased with new recruitment, he entered Guatemalan occupied the square of Esquipulas on June 30, marched on July 1 to Quezaltepeque and occupied the towns of Chiquimula and Zacapa on the 2nd, all in Guatemalan territory. Carrera upon hearing this ordered General Vicente Cerna and Colonel Leandro Navas to attack Cabañas army they attacked Cabañas in open country, near Chiquimula on July 6 at 8 a.m.A bayonet attack by the Guatemalans resolved the action at 10:30 in the morning, and the Hondurans were defeated.on July 6 at 8 a.m. Commissioners from both countries signed a treaty in Esquipulas but President Carrera refused to ratify it. Renewed hostilities followed, with Honduras' President Cabanas crossing the border, seizing artillery, and sacking Chiquimula. Carrera, in pursuit, entered Honduras, looted Santa Rosa de los Llanos, and returned. Despite mediation attempts by Nicaragua and El Salvador, an armistice was only achieved after a more significant threat arose. Carrera, facing political challenges upon returning to the presidency in 1854, supported a conservative revolt in Honduras, leading to the defeat of Cabañas in 1855.
