= Bombardment of Omoa =

1873 assault by a British ship on Honduras

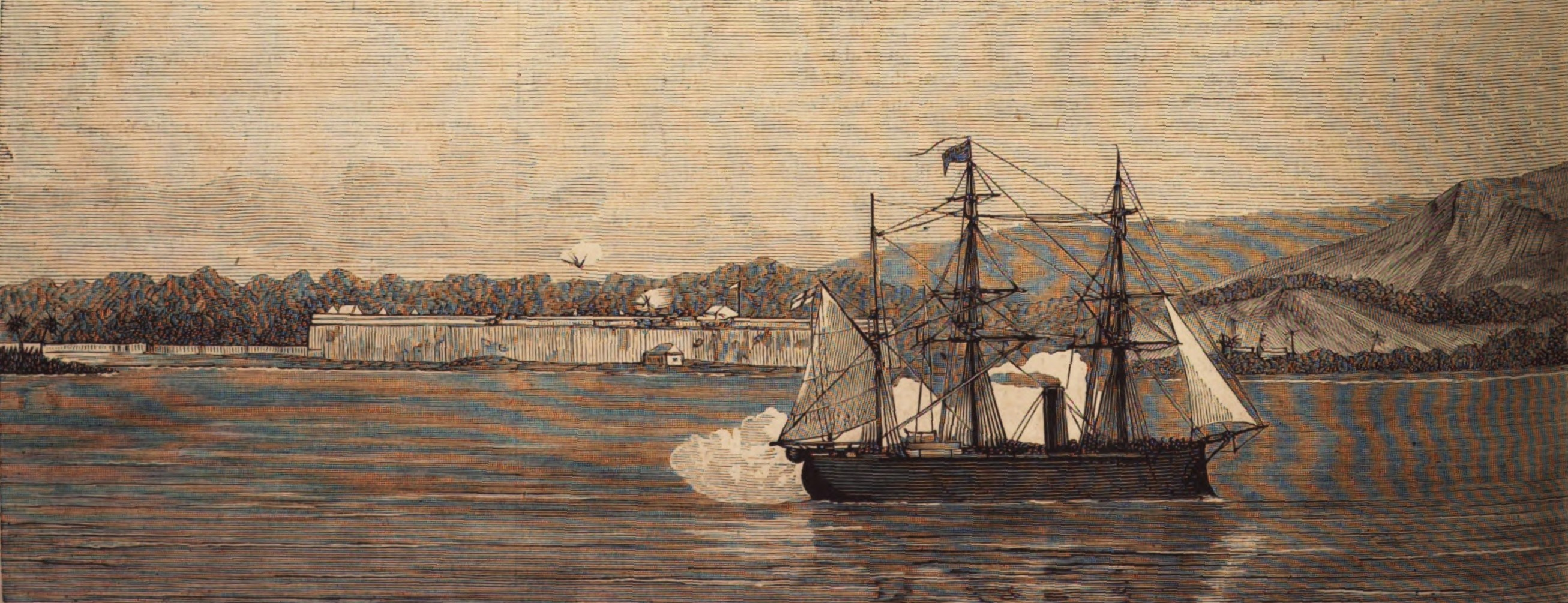
- HMS Niobe bombarding San Fernando Castle (original from The Illustrated London News, November 1873)
Date	19–20 August 1873
Location	Omoa, Honduras
Result	British victory

Combatants
United Kingdom	Honduras

Commanders and leaders
(United Kingdom) Sir Lambton Loraine, 11th Baronet	(Honduras) Ricardo Streber (surrendered)

The Bombardment of Omoa was an assault by the British ship Niobe under the command of Sir Lambton Loraine on the Honduran fortress of Omoa between 19 and 20 August 1873.

== Bombardment ==
The ship Niobe, previously in Trujillo under the control of the Arias government, returned to Puerto Cortés and then reappeared off Omoa during the night of 18 August 1873. On the morning of 19 August, an officer from the frigate approached General Streber with a communication from Captain Sir Lambton Loraine.

The message outlined the following events:

1) The British Consulate had been violated by officers and troops of the city, and a significant amount of property, including jewelry belonging to the Vice-Consul, had been stolen.
2) The city of Omoa had been plundered on the orders of the Fortress Commander, resulting in the loss of properties owned by the British, specifically Mr. Guild & Co. and Mr. Johnston.
3) British subjects T. Smith, C. Davis, and two others had been captured without any criminal cause and forced into military service. Additionally, the Englishwoman Mary Anna Smith had been imprisoned in the castle.

Upon receiving this communication, the Commander of the Niobe requested the release of British subjects held by General Streber, both military and prisoners. He demanded a payment of $100,000 in gold and silver to compensate for the losses suffered by British subjects during the looting of the town on 17 August. The British Consul's stolen possessions were also to be returned. Lastly, General Streber was required to specify the reparations he intended to make regarding the insult on 19 August, when the British Consulate was forcibly opened and looted by his officers and troops.

The Commander of Omoa sought an audience with the Captain of the Niobe, but it was denied. Meanwhile, an incident unfolded: the Castle Commander, aiming to boost morale, announced General Solares' victory in Chamelecón, celebrating with three cannon shots. In response, the Niobe immediately initiated a bombardment, raising the British flag. The bombardment continued throughout the day and night of 19 August until 6 a.m. on 20 August when the Fortress Commander raised a white flag.

Under the threat of cannon fire, the Omoa Commander agreed to a treaty, committing to release prisoners, return the claimed jewelry, and sign a document promising that the Government of Honduras would pay in cash for all losses incurred during the looting of Omoa.
