= Plus Ultra Brigade =

Military coalition of Spain and Spanish American countries (2003–2004)

- Brigada Plus Ultra
- Active: 2003–2004
- Disbanded: April 2004
- Countries: Spain; Dominican Republic; El Salvador; Honduras; Nicaragua
- Allegiance: Multi-National Force – Iraq
- Size: 2,500 troops
- Garrison/HQ: Al-Qādisiyyah (Spain); Najaf (Central America)
- Engagements: Iraq War

The Plus Ultra Brigade, or Brigada Hispanoamericana, was a military contingent of mixed personnel from Spain (some 1,300 troops), the Dominican Republic, El Salvador, Honduras, and Nicaragua (about 1,200 troops between the four), which was commissioned to support coalition troops in the Iraq War. The deployment started in July 2003. The brigade's name was a reference to Plus Ultra, the national motto of Spain. The battalions of the four Hispanic-American countries were equipped and transported by the U.S. military, and received some specific training in Germany prior to their arrival to the Persian Gulf.

The Spaniards were based in Al-Qādisiyyah, and the Central Americans in Najaf, in south-central Iraq, near Dīwānīyah. Their objective was to relieve the U.S. Marine Corps in the area so that the Marines could be transferred to other, more problematic regions in the country.

During their tenure in the region, the Plus Ultra Brigade's troops had few hostile clashes with insurgents. Some of their camps were harassed with RPG and grenade attacks, but there were few casualties. There was only one serious incident, a skirmish with insurgents in early April 2004 in Najaf, which left one Salvadoran soldier dead and at least 19 Iraqis killed. The Rules of Engagement that the units followed were very restrictive and the authorization to use deadly force needed high command clearance, due to a directive seeking to "avoid or minimize at all costs collateral damage to people or property".

The Plus Ultra Brigade finally dissolved in April 2004, when the recently elected new Spanish socialist government and the governments of Nicaragua, the Dominican Republic, and Honduras decided to withdraw their troops (a decision that somewhat tensed Spanish-American relations). The lack of public support for the deployment and the war in Iraq was cited as the main reason, with Nicaragua, additionally stating its financial constraints.

The Salvadoran military had (200) troops in Iraq by December 2008: a reduction of almost half from its original deployment of 380 soldiers. Salvadoran troops were withdrawn in 2009.

== Brigades ==
In the Iraq war there were two brigades:

The Plus Ultra Brigade I

- 7th Light Air-Transportable Infantry Brigade "Galicia"
  - 3rd Tercio "Juan de Austria", Spanish Legion
  - Xatruch Battalion I, Honduras
  - Cuscatlán Battalion I, El Salvador
  - Quisqueya Task Force I, Dominican Republic
  - Nicaragua Humanitarian Aid Task Force

The Plus Ultra Brigade II

- 11th Mechanized Infantry Brigade "Extremadura"
  - 6th Mechanized Infantry Regiment "Saboya"
  - Xatruch Battalion II, Honduras
  - Cuscatlán Battalion II, El Salvador
  - Quisqueya Task Force II, Dominican Republic
  - Nicaragua Humanitarian Aid Task Force

=== I Plus Ultra Brigade ===
The command of the Brigade Plus Ultra was given to the general, Alfredo Cardona, and had the order to act within the Hispanic-Polish Division that participated in the invasion of Iraq. On July 23, 2003, the Airport of Santiago de Compostela where the first Boeing 707 that would leave with the first Spanish contingent of 60 troops heading for Kuwait, where later it will be established in Iraq, creating and preparing camps in the Cities of Dīwānīyah and Najaf. Then, the assault ship Galician (L-51), the auxiliary ship Marqués de la Ensenada (A-11) and the Spanish frigate Reina Sofía would leave from the Naval Station Rota, Spain with part of the Spanish contingent, including the Spanish navy, arriving at the port of Um Umar on April 9, 2004. The rest of the contingent would continue to sail to Iraq from various points in Spain to complete the 1300 Spanish troops. The last contingent, made up of 335 soldiers, set out for Iraq from the Air Base of Torrejón de Ardoz on August 14, 2003. Later on, they would join the 1200 Central American troops to help the Spanish in the reconstruction of the Country, taking the Brigade the relay of the marines of the United States on August 28.

All Spanish and Central American troops will be established in Spain, in the city of Dīwānīyah, where the headquarters of the brigade is established, and in Base Al-Andalus of Najaf (Also known as Camp Golf ), until mid-December, when it will be relieved by the Plus Ultra Brigade II.

=== II Plus Ultra Brigade ===
The first brigade was later replaced by Brigade Plus Ultra II, that would have as the core of formation the Mechanized Division. The rank of general in charge of the brigade passed to General Fulgencio Coll Bucher. The second Brigade will relieve the first with the transfer of troops to the bases Of Diwaniya and Najaf, during the middle of December 2003 until December 18, in which the last contingent would arrive. During the time of stay, the Spanish and Central American troops had many confrontations with the Iraqi insurgency. One of the most important combats was the Battle of April 4, in the base Al-Andalus in Najaf.

=== Withdrawal ===
After the 2004 Madrid train bombings, the Spanish general election was won by José Luis Rodríguez Zapatero, who promised the withdrawal of the Spanish troops in Iraq. A new relay was being prepared but was interrupted on April 18 by the government, ordering the return of the force. To evacuate the camps, 1000 Legionaries and specialists of the Engineer Command were sent.

On April 21, General Fulgencio Coll Bucher handed over the command to the General José Manuel Muñoz of the exit operation "Support to the withdrawal (CONAPRE)", officially dissolving II Plus Ultra Brigade on April 29 in Bótoa (Badajoz).

The priority of the mission was that the displacements were carried out with maximum security, reason why it became necessary to coordinate the operation with the American forces. The first phase of the withdrawal materialized on April, 26. The last 150 Spanish soldiers from Al Andalus Base in Najaf headed to Spain Base in Diwaniyah, US soldiers occupying positions at the base of Najaf to avoid occupation by militias of the Imam Muqtada al-Sadr Muqtada al Sader. The last 260 Spanish soldiers of the II Plus Ultra Brigade arrived in Kuwait on the afternoon of April 27, thus completing the exit from Iraq of all units.

The last boat arrived in the port of Valencia on July 14, 2004, ending the withdrawal of the Spanish contingent, and also of the Central American contingent that retired at the same time, except the troops of El Salvador's Cuscatlán Battalion who retired in 2009.

== See also ==
- Multi-National Force – Iraq
