= Malespín =

Central and South American Spanish slang

The Malespín is a kind of Spanish-language slang which originated in the 19th century in El Salvador and then spread to the rest of Central America. It is currently vestigial, and survives only in a small number of words.

Tradition says that this slang was invented as a sort of key for the Salvadoran military and political leader Francisco Malespín. General Malespin was elected president in 1844 and deposed in 1845, after he led the country to war against Nicaragua.

Róger Matus Lazo of the Nicaraguan Academy of Language, refers to Don Alfonso Valle in his Dictionary of the Nicaraguan Speech (2nd ed, 1972). He explains that the Malespín is a kind of slang spoken between the young, especially students, and by "ladies" of "good society".

Broadly speaking, it changes some letters by others, as follows:

- a for e
- i for o
- b for t
- f for g
- p for m

and vice versa.

Valle adds: "There is a tradition that it was invented by the Salvadoran general Francisco Malespín, in the same year of 1845 as when he burned and looted León, metropolis of Nicaragua."

Julián Corrales Munguía, in his work The language of the underworld: the slang (1972), said that the key of malespín, so popular in past years, has been forgotten in general, but there are some people who remember it perfectly.

Róger Matus Lazo said that in gang language of Nicaragua are some words with slight variants of the original word. The following examples show the words as pronounced now, and in brackets as each should be written according to the key of "classic" malespín (a>e, i>o, b>t, m>p, f>g, y p>m):

- arpene or curpeni (arpeni): brother;
- nelfes, nelfin or nelfis (nelfes): buttocks;
- acoi (eco): here;
- cedania (cedane): string;
- cunabi, cuñedi or cuñefli (cuñedi): brother;
- menfli (mafe) paste or glue for smell;
- nicha (niche) night;
- detroi (datres): behind;
- esconi (asconi): corner;
- percedi or percebi (percedi): market;
- chinandofi (chonendafe): chinandega;
- Frenedi (Frenede): Granada;
- frendi (frenda): big, strong person;
- Penefi or Benefia (Penefue): Managua.

Sometimes, there is hesitation in some words, as shown in the alternations in the vowel and the consonant system: arpene and curpeni (brother); cunabi, cuñedi and cuñefli (brother in law); Benefia and Penefi (Managua); nelfin, nelfis and nelfes (hips); percebi and percedi (market).

In the Central American countries that have adopted some words of this slang, usually with slight variations of the original term, as users have sometimes changed the spelling through forgetfulness or ignorance of the key.

According to the key of malespín, many words in popular and colloquial use are derived from this language; including, for example, the following:

- acoi (eco): here;
- arpene or curpeni (arpeni) brother;
- bimbolli: fool
- breteji (brete): work;
- cencinolli: Briefs
- cedania (cedane): string;
- cegá: coffee;
- cetolli: horse;
- jincho: Indian
- chinandofi (chonendafe): chinandega;
- cunabi, cuñedi or cuñefli (cuñedi): brother;
- detroi (datres): behind;
- Estelfi: Estelí;
- esconi (asconi): corner;
- frendi (frenda): big, strong person;
- Frenedi, Frenede; Granada
- guajolli: old person;
- machín: ridiculous, Indian;
- Masaya: Masachuset;
- Matagalpa: Mataplenfi;
- men: bread
- menfli (mafe) paste or glue for smell;
- mlebe: silver
- nafri: black
- nelfes, nelfin or nelfis (nelfes): buttocks;
- nicha (niche) night;
- pelis: bad people;
- penefi or benefia (penefue);
- perbacoye: butter
- percedi or percebi (percedi) market;
- perone: marine
- tuanis: good;

== Nicaragua ==
In Nicaragua, the words "nelfis" ('hips') and "tuani" ('good') have become part of popular speech. In Costa Rica, people use the variant "tuanis".

== Costa Rica ==
In Costa Rica the word "brete" ('lock' as an abbreviation of work) is common, as is "tuanis" ("Good people"). Both are words originating from Malespín. The street slang or jargon of Costa Rica is known as "pachuco", a regional variation of the Spanish influenced by words and expressions in English, Malespín code, Limonense Creole, traditional Spanish, old Spanish (Sephardic Spanish) and other terms popular in Costa Rica.

Very common words such as "detroi" (behind) or "tuanis" (plural of tuani, meaning good), come from Malespín, not English as many people say. The English expression "too nice" has nothing to do at all with "tuanis," nor is the city of "Detroit" related to the use of "detroi."
