= Julissa Villanueva =

Doctor of forensic medicine from Honduras

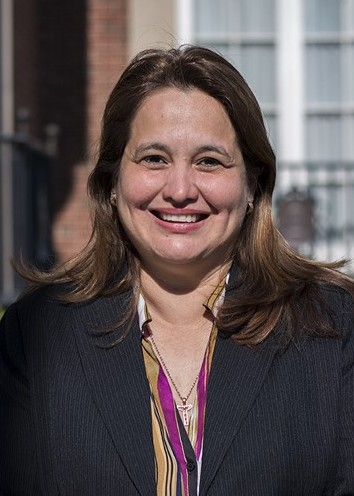
- Born: 12 May 1972 (age 52); Tegucigalpa, Honduras
- Employer: Public Prosecutor's Office (Honduras)
- Known for: Forensic science Pathology
- Awards: Women of Courage

Semma Julissa (Julissa) Villanueva Barahona (born 12 May 1972) is a Honduran public servant, who is the Director of the Honduras Public Prosecutor's Office Forensic Medicine Department.

== Education ==
Julissa Villanueva was born in Tegucigalpa in 1972. She studied medicine after seeing her father suffering from tetanus, and is now a doctor who specialises in pathology. She chose to specialise in pathology when she heard about the shortage of skilled forensic scientists in Honduras.

== Career ==
Villanueva began working as a forensic pathologist in 2002. She was appointed Director of Forensic Science in the Public Prosecutor's Office in 2013. In 2015 she launched the Journal of Forensic Sciences of Honduras.

Villanueva works to protect women and children from violent crimes in Honduras. Working with Spain, Villanueva is developing a program called DNA Prokids. She has encouraged the Public Prosecutor's Office to give accredited training to forensic scientists. Villanueva has driven for more Villanueva worked with the United States Department of State to use DNA to identify migrant bodies. She introduced a computerised database to store information in the morgue. Villanueva created the first humanitarian cemetery in Honduras, which allows unclaimed or unidentified corpses to be exhumed and used as evidence in clinical trials, inspired by the military cemetery in Arlington, Virginia. She developed a Nationwide Human Identification Registry to handle the unsolved murders across the country. She introduced Gesell chambers, to allow victims of sexual harassment or abuse to provide testimony in court without revealing their identity.

In 2018 she received the International Women of Courage Award from the United States Department of State. She was awarded the honour by Melania Trump.
