= Florencio Xatruch =

Honduran military leader (1811–1893)

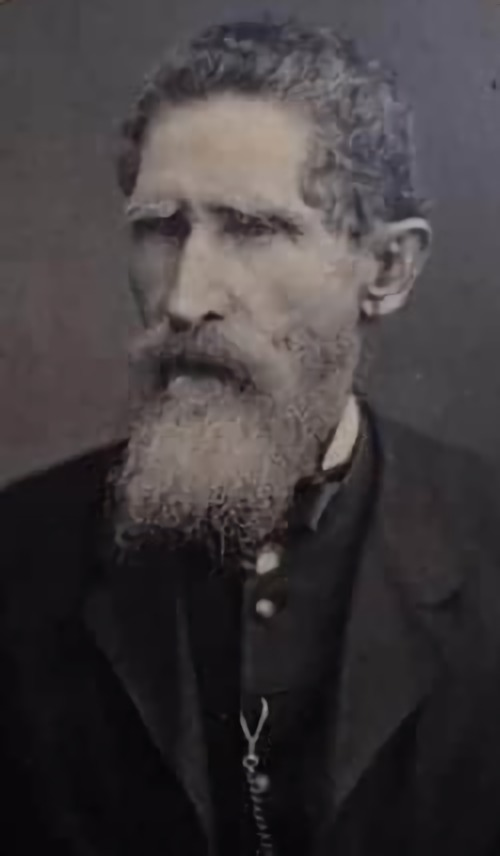
Florencio Xatruch

Florencio Xatruch (October 21, 1811 – February 15, 1893) was a general who led the Honduran expeditionary force against William Walker in Nicaragua in 1856.

== Life ==
Florencio Xatruch was born in San Antonio de Oriente, Honduras. His father, Ramón Xatruch, was of Catalan background, and his mother, Eugenia Villagra, was part of Choluteca's upper class, and whose family owned mines.

In 1824, Xatruch was sent to León, Nicaragua to continue with his studies.

== Military career ==
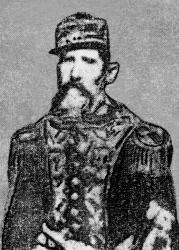
General Florencio Xatruch

In 1826, as he returned to Honduras, he joined the armed forces of Domingo Sarmiento and Santos Sánchez, who were against the government of Diego Vigil. He then participated in Francisco Morazán's armed forces, on March 14, 1832, along with his friend José Santos Guardiola, in the war in Jocoro, El Salvador. He was promoted to sergeant, and this promotion was signed by Morazan himself. In 1841 he was again promoted to captain by General Julian Tercero, and he served under the leadership of Francisco Ferrera.

When Juan Lindo was president, Xatruch was elected representative to the National Congress and participated in the approval of the third Constitution of Honduras in 1848. In 1850, he participated in an armed engagement supporting José Santos Guardiola. He moved to Nicaragua, along with his brother Pedro, who was eventually promoted to general as well. In Granada, they offered their services to the "legitimates", and their troops were called "Xatruches", and then "Catruches", and finally "Catrachos", term (nickname) that Hondurans are known as, especially in Nicaragua.

In 1855, Xatruch was promoted to brigade general. President Guardiola sent Honduran troops to fight William Walker under the leadership of the Xatruch brothers. Florencio was named General in Chief of the Allied Armies of Central America, but later, for political reasons, Juan Rafael Mora was left in charge and Xatruch was demoted to Inspector General.

He also led the fight against the filibusters in Puebla, Rivas.

Several Central American countries recognized him as brigade and division general. On June 12, 1857, Xatruch made a triumphant entrance to Comayagua, which was then the capital of Honduras. On May 22, 1858, President Guardiola named him Minister of War and Commerce, title he held until 1860. He was Minister of Finance of Honduras from 1858 to 1859. On February 15, 1864, the General Assembly of Honduras declared him Vice President of Honduras to the cabinet of José María Medina.

He briefly acted as President from March 26 – May 17, 1871.

== Life in Nicaragua ==
After the civil war of 1856, Xatruch stayed in Nicaragua, and worked in agriculture and mining. It is told that he had to sell the medals of honor he had received in order to finance his new businesses, which included two coffee farms (Honduras and La Cruz) and several estates in Managua.

In Nicaragua, Xatruch was named Director of Eastern Highways, by president Tomás Martínez, and he worked building the highways to Mataere, Masatepe and Jinotepe. In 1878, president Pedro Joaquín Chamorro named him Governor of Chinandega and Leon, and that same year, on August 9, he was named Division General of the Nicaragua Army.

== Death ==
Xatruch died in Managua, Nicaragua on February 15, 1893, when he was 82 years old. He was buried in the San Pedro Cemetery with great honors. Nicaragua National Congress, by decree on February 24, 1893, authorized the following epitaph: " From Nicaragua to the Honduran by birth but Nicaraguan by adoption, General Florencio Xatruch, a testimony of admiration and thankfulness for the services he provided to the Country".

== Tarea Xatruch Battalion (2003) ==
In August 2003 Honduras President Ricardo Maduro sent a troop of 370 officials, technical staff and soldiers to participate in the Iraq War in support of the international contingent led by the United States. The troop was called Tarea Xatruch Battalion in honor of Xatruch. The group included 40 officers, 22 sub-officers, 21 technical staff and 287 privates. They left August 11 for Spain for a training period, and then to Nasariya, Karbala and Najaf in Iraq, where they joined 360 Salvadoran, 230 Nicaraguan, 300 Dominican, and 1,300 Spanish soldiers.
