= Raid on Puerto Caballos (1594) =

- Part of the Anglo–Spanish War
Date	16–18 March 1594
Location	Off Puerto Cabellos, Royal Audiencia of Guatemala (Present day Honduras)
Result	English victory

Belligerents
Spain	England

Commanders and leaders
Diego Ramírez	Captain James Langton

Strength
7 ships 200 militia & sailors	2 ships 1 prize frigate

Casualties and losses
1 ship captured 6 ships burned	Light

The Raid on Puerto Caballos was a military event that took place during the Anglo–Spanish War where a small expedition of ships funded and raised by the Earl of Cumberland was sent to the Caribbean under command of Captain James Langton. At Puerto Caballos on the coast of the Royal Audiencia of Guatemala in the New World empire of Spain on 16 March 1594, Langton raided the place and after a three-day battle won possession of seven ships under command of Diego Ramirez along with much booty.

== Background ==
England's war with Spain had been going on for nearly ten years and Spanish colonies, warships, and merchants were subject to attacks by English privateers. These were operated by joint stock ventures similar to the English Armada and one such expedition was raised by the Earl of Cumberland in late 1592. Led by Captain James Langton in the lead ship Anthony of 120 tons, the Pilgrim of 100 tons under Captain Francis Slingsby, and a pinnace Discovery, they set sail from Plymouth, England in early 1593.

By August they had reached the Caribbean, refreshing for provisions at St Lucia and Martinique, taking a few prizes before raiding and overrunning Margarita Island in present-day Venezuela and gaining 2000 ducats. Within the next seven months, Langton terrorized Spanish ports and merchant shipping including a two-month blockade of Hispaniola where Langton took nine Spanish prizes and penetrated inland to attack via the Soco River, ranches and sugar mills. In February, he defeated two Spanish frigates near Pedernales, one of which he captured and used to add to his fleet; his other ship Pilgrim returned to England with some plunder, before heading to Puerto Caballos, which had been a target for privateers.

== Raid ==
On 16 March 1594, Langton sighted the port of Puerto Caballos and entered its bay, seeing a number of ships in the harbour. With his flagship Anthony flying false colors, Langton seized the harbor pilot boat and then demanded the surrender of the seven large ships awaiting cargo inside under Diego Ramírez. The demand was immediately refused but it did not stop Langton and so the next morning he engaged in a day-long gunnery duel with the Spanish, causing damage to both the town and ships.

The following day, Langton had not succeeded so far in any of his gains, so decided on one final action. This came when he launched a blazing twenty-ton prize against Ramírez's flagship. Panic ensued with the Spanish, after which the defenders' will was broken and convinced them to abandon the ship.

Langton seized the chance and quickly the English boarded Ramírez's 250-ton San Diego whose captain, Luis de Sevilla, was killed during the exchange of fire. As a result, the rest of the Spanish ships were boarded one after the other and some were lashed together. As well as the San Diego the prizes now consisted of the 200-ton Espíritu Santo, the 120-ton San Antón de la Magdalena, the 140-ton Presentación, and three smaller vessels ranging from 100 - 120 tons.

Langton then went ashore and decided to hold the vessels for ransom but when the Spaniards refused to pay, Langton then burnt one of the smaller ships. Langton was again rebuffed but on seeing the recently discovered haul he realized a ransom was not necessary. Instead while keeping fire on the Spanish defenses, the English concentrated by taking all the booty from every ship and then placed it all aboard Ramírez's former flagship which Langton uses as his main prize. Langton having been satisfied with what he had then prepared to leave, and so on the third day the English departed with the six prizes and their guns blazing keeping the Spanish at bay from a potential counterattack.

== Aftermath ==
The English returned to Plymouth "amid great rejoicings and excitement" by 25 May and the haul of goods seized were counted with the Earl of Cumberland himself being present. The plunder did not consist of much treasure but over 5,000 hides, 57 chests and 64 bags of indigo, 10 chests of sugar, nearly 30 pounds of pearls, 10 tons of blockwood, nine gold buttons set with emeralds, and a single gold ingot. In addition to this were the brass cannon from the Spanish ships and other miscellaneous goods.

The expedition thus was a highly successful venture and made Langton a very rich man. What's more it enabled funding for more expeditions including Walter Raleigh's El Dorado Expedition, the Preston Somers Expedition at Caracas, and the ill-fated return of Drake and Hawkins to the Caribbean the following year. Puerto Caballos would be subject to attack many times before the war's end; the last being in 1603 when Christopher Newport captured the place and held it for eighteen days.
