= Tarea Xatruch =

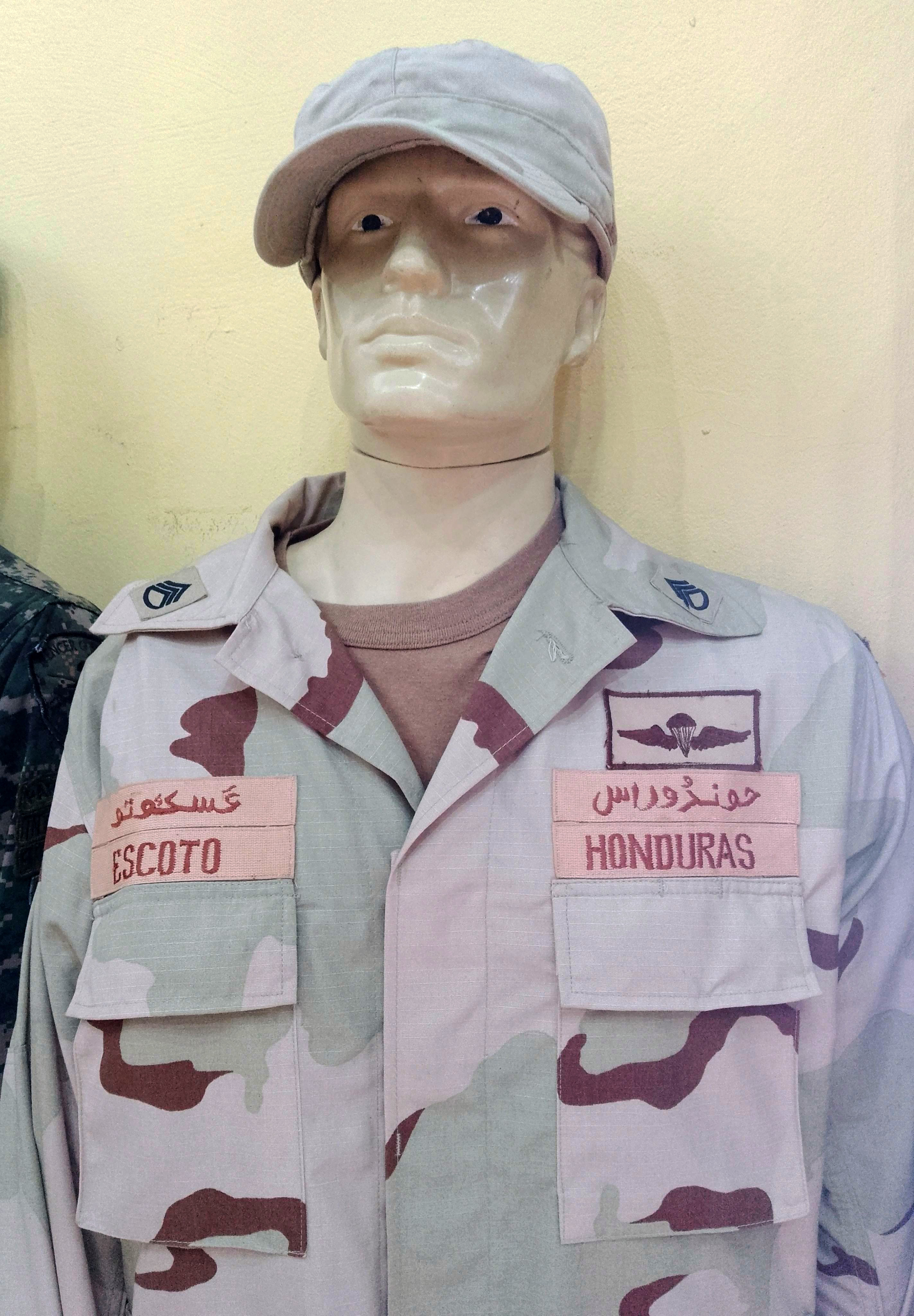
Uniform used by Honduran soldiers during the Iraq war.

In August 2003 Honduran President Ricardo Maduro sent a troop of 370 officers, technical staff and soldiers to Iraq in support of the international contingent led by the United States.

The troop was called Tarea Xatruch Battalion in honor of General Florencio Xatruch. The group included 40 officials, 22 sub-officials, 21 technical staff and 287 soldiers. They left August 11 for Spain for a training period, and then to Nasariya, Karbala, and Najaf in Iraq, where they joined 360 Salvadoran, 230 Nicaraguan, 300 Dominican, and 1,300 Spanish officials and soldiers in the Plus Ultra Brigade.
