= Galil (disambiguation) =

The IMI Galil is a family of Israeli small arms. Galil may also refer to:

- Galilee (Hebrew: הגליל, transliteration HaGalil, i.e. "the Galil"), the region in Israel from which the name was adapted to other uses
- Galil (administrative unit), a Jewish administrative unit in Polish-Lithuanian Commonwealth
- Gershon Galil, Professor of Biblical Studies and Ancient History at the University of Haifa, Israel
- Yisrael Galil (1923-1995), inventor of the Galil assault rifle
- Zvi Galil (born 1947), Israeli computer scientist, mathematician, and President of Tel Aviv University
- Galil Ben Shanan (born 1982), Israeli football goalkeeper
- Galil Jewish–Arab School, the first joint Arab-Jewish primary school in Israel
- Camp Galil, a summer camp for Jewish students, located in Pennsylvania, United States
