= Honduran–Salvadoran War of 1871 =

War between El Salvador and Honduras in 1871

Honduran-Salvadoran War of 1871
Date	March 16 – April 12 1871
Location	El Salvador and Honduras
Result	Honduran victory: Francisco Dueñas overthrown; Santiago González becomes president

Combatants
Honduras (El Salvador) Salvadoran rebels	El Salvador (Honduras) Honduran rebels

Commanders and leaders
(Honduras) José María Medina (Honduras) Francisco López (Honduras) Andrés van Severen (Honduras) Mariano Álvarez (Honduras) Juan López Aguirre (El Salvador) Santiago González	(El Salvador) Francisco Dueñas (POW) (El Salvador) Ciriaco Choto (El Salvador) Tomás Martínez (POW) (Honduras) Florencio Xatruch (surrendered)

The Honduran-Salvadoran War of 1871 (Spanish: Guerra Salvadoreña-hondureña de 1871) was a military conflict between El Salvador and Honduras in 1871.

== Conflict ==
In March 1871, the Honduran government, led by José María Medina, declared war on El Salvador due to differences with President Francisco Dueñas, who had supported uprisings against the Honduran government. Medina, allied with generals Santiago González and José María Rivas, prepared for war with three fronts: South led by Generals Francisco López and Andrés van Severen, Center commanded by General Mariano Álvarez, and North under General Juan López Aguirre.

The Southern army attacked Pasaquina on March 16, 1871, defeating the Honduran forces led by General Florencio Xatruch. Xatruch seized Nacaome and advanced towards Tegucigalpa. Simultaneously, the Center and North fronts invaded El Salvador from Gotera and Sensuntepeque, respectively. González declared himself Provisional President of El Salvador after capturing Sensuntepeque. Decisive battles occurred in Santa Ana from April 7 to 10, where Honduran generals López, Ochoa, and Pineda, along with Salvadoran General Juan Antonio Medina Orellana, defeated the forces led by Generals Tomás Martínez and Ciriaco Choto in San Miguel.

On April 12, 1871, after a brief 27-day campaign, the Honduran army captured San Salvador, taking President Francisco Dueñas and ex-President of Nicaragua General Tomás Martínez into custody. The swift military actions resulted in the successful invasion and occupation of El Salvador by Honduras.

== See also ==
- El Salvador–Honduras relations
