= Sherman Expedition =

Date	August 1873
Location	Honduras
Result	Honduran governmental victory

Combatants
Honduras; Supported by Guatemala	(Guatemala) Guatemalan rebels Honduras rebels (El Salvador) Salvadorans Rebels; Supported by Costa Rica

Commanders and leaders
(Honduras) Celeo Arias (Honduras) Ricardo Streber (Guatemala) Gregorio Solares	(Guatemala) Enrique Palacios (POW) (Guatemala) Carlos Alvarado †

The Sherman Expedition was an expedition made by Guatemalan, Salvadoran, and Honduran rebels supported by Costa Rica in an attempt to change the governments of Honduras and Guatemala in 1873.

== Conflict ==
The conservative party, defeated in Guatemala in 1871, organized a counter-revolution in 1873 with an expedition led by General Enrique Palacios aboard the General Sherman steamship. Their goal was to change the governments of Honduras and Guatemala by attempting to seize the port of Omoa. However, the small garrison at the castle in Omoa skillfully defeated them through a clever maneuver on August 7, 1873, forcing the expedition to hastily re-embark.

Another part of the expedition, having entered the country through Puerto Cortés to San Pedro Sula, confronted General Gregorio Solares and his 600 Guatemalan troops entrenched north of the Chamelecón River, about two leagues from the city. On August 9 of the same year, the invading expedition, comprising 450 men, suffered a defeat with significant casualties, including General Casto Alvarado. This defeat rendered them incapable of further actions.
