= Guerra de los Padres =

Date	1860 - 22 de junio de 1861
Location	Honduras
Result	Victory of the Honduran Army

Belligerents
Anti secular rebels	Honduran Army Supported by: El Salvador

Commanders and leaders
Miguel del Cid	José Santos Guardiola

The Guerra de los Padres ("War of the Priests") was a violent political crisis that took place in Honduras between April and June 1861. A conflict between the government and the clergy began when president José Santos Guardiola agreed to permit freedom of worship to the inhabitants of the Bay Islands, a predominantly Protestant colony of Britain. This contravened the Constitution of 1848.

== Background ==
The following year, 1860, the Vicar of the Cid, settled in La Paz, summoned the people in a "Pastoral against the Honduran Government." From his rhetoric, charges and crimes were formulated, in addition to the proliferation of Freemasonry and politics, for which he agitated the population, on December 26, 1860, the Vicar of the Cid located in San Antonio, excommunicated the president in turn General José Santos Guardiola, an act that the government replied on January 5, 1861, ordering the expulsion from the national territory of Vicar Miguel del Cid, leaving as substitute Fray José Nicolás Irías Midence, who had returned from his exile. Del Cid, upon learning of the government orders, proceeded to move several of his relatives to carry out protests and marches against the government, firstly a good group of civilians under the command of the priest Yanuario Reyes were organized in the city of Nacaome. Hostile, looting and vandalism, that wanting to be dismantled by government forces, the rebels barricaded themselves in the local church, causing a small battle.

== Movements ==
In western Honduras, Presbyter Nicolás Madrid, commanding another group, took the city of Gracias (Lempira).

In the south west, in the city of La Paz, the priest Néstor Grau failed in his attempt to invade the cities of Santa Ana and Opatoro.

For its part, the city of Choluteca yielded to the organized troops under the command of Priest Ramón Villalobos and seconded by Colonel Felipe Espinoza of Salvadoran nationality.

The Villa de Guarita was attacked by an invading force under the command of priest Jerónimo Palma and priest Lorenzo Hernández and twenty-five other people.

In the town of La Virtud there was a clash between the forces of the people and then the government forces under the command of Colonel Venancio Pineda against the rebel invaders under the command of priest Jerónimo Palma and priest Lorenzo Hernández.

In the town of Goascorán, the pacifist forces under the command of Colonel Samuel Cáceres defeated the rebels, but they reorganized and marched to El Salvador where they received support from the Salvadoran General Francisco Lope.

On June 22, 1861, Fray Juan Félix de Jesús Zepeda y Zepeda was appointed as Bishop of Honduras, who managed to end the violent revolts and appease the population.

== Consequences ==
The War of the Fathers, ended when the government troops put order between the rebels and the imprisonment of the leaders. It left the Honduran people divided between popular opinion and politics, which had repercussions on the administrative plans of General Guardiola and future governments.The exact number of people who were victims of this event is not known.

In January 1861, according to a government decree, the properties of the Vicar Miguel Delcid were confiscated and auctioned, the same was done with the properties of the priest Néstor Graú (Grand).

On July 9, 1861, an "Act of Concordat" was signed with the Holy See between the one sent by the government of Honduras, its ambassador Carlos Gutiérrez and Cardinal Giacomo Antonelli, Secretary of State and representative of Pope Pius IX on the facts. succeeded, Guardiola's excommunication would also be lifted.

Perhaps, due to this fact and the discontent of the population, he was assassinated on January 11, 1862, by his own presidential guard under the command of Plaza Mayor Pablo Agurcia.

== Bibliography ==
- Becerra, Longino. Historical Evolution of Honduras, Publisher Baktun, Tegucigalpa, Honduras, 2005. ISBN 978-99926-19-48-3.
- Historical chronology of Honduras
- Yankelevich, Pablo. Texts of the history of Centroamérica and the Caribbean, Institute of Investigations Dr. José María Luis Dwells, University of Guadalajara, Mexico. Publishing Institute of Investigations Dr. José María Luis Dwells, 1990; ISBN 978-968-6382-05-1.
