= Primary elections in Honduras =

Primary elections in Honduras represent the mechanism used in that country by each political party to choose their candidates for the general presidential elections. These are held on the third year of the current President's mandate, specifically on the second Sunday of March, every four years. (Note: In accordance to the amendment to Article 113 of the Honduras Electoral Law (2014).) These are not mandatory or paid by the Government. Regulation is carried out by the Supreme Electoral Tribunal, being supported by the National Registry of People in the checking of the legitimacy of the process.

== History ==
The origin of the primary elections date back to the early ages of the country. Parties presented their candidates for the Head of State elections, being the first case also the elections for the first Head of State of the nation, that title being given to Dionisio de Herrera by the Constituent Assembly. During his presidency, the Constitution was redacted.

== After the primaries ==
The winners of the primaries are able to participate in the general elections, those being held a year later.

== See also ==
- Politics of Honduras.
- President of Honduras.
- National Congress of Honduras.
- Honduras.
