= Public Prosecutor's Office (Honduras) =

- Ministerio Público de Honduras

Agency overview
- Formed: 6 January 1994
- Headquarters: Tegucigalpa, M.D.C.
- Minister responsible: Pleaded Óscar Fernando Chinchilla
- Website: https://web.archive.org/web/20051023232929/http://www.gob.hn/

The Public Prosecutor's Office of Honduras (Ministerio Público de Honduras) is a Public and constitutional organization. It was established on 6 January 1994 through Legislative Decree No. 228-93. It has its headquarters in the city of Tegucigalpa, the capital of Honduras. It is an independent, autonomous, and non-political organization. It is not under the Supreme Court or the Office of the Attorney General. The Attorney General is appointed by the National Congress.

Its main functions are to prosecute all types of crimes, to ensure that every citizen follows the Constitution and the law of the land, and to represent, to defend, and to protect the general interests of society. All of the Republic of Honduras is the jurisdiction of the Public Prosecutor's Office. Every citizen has access to this office without any restriction of age, sex, religion, etc.

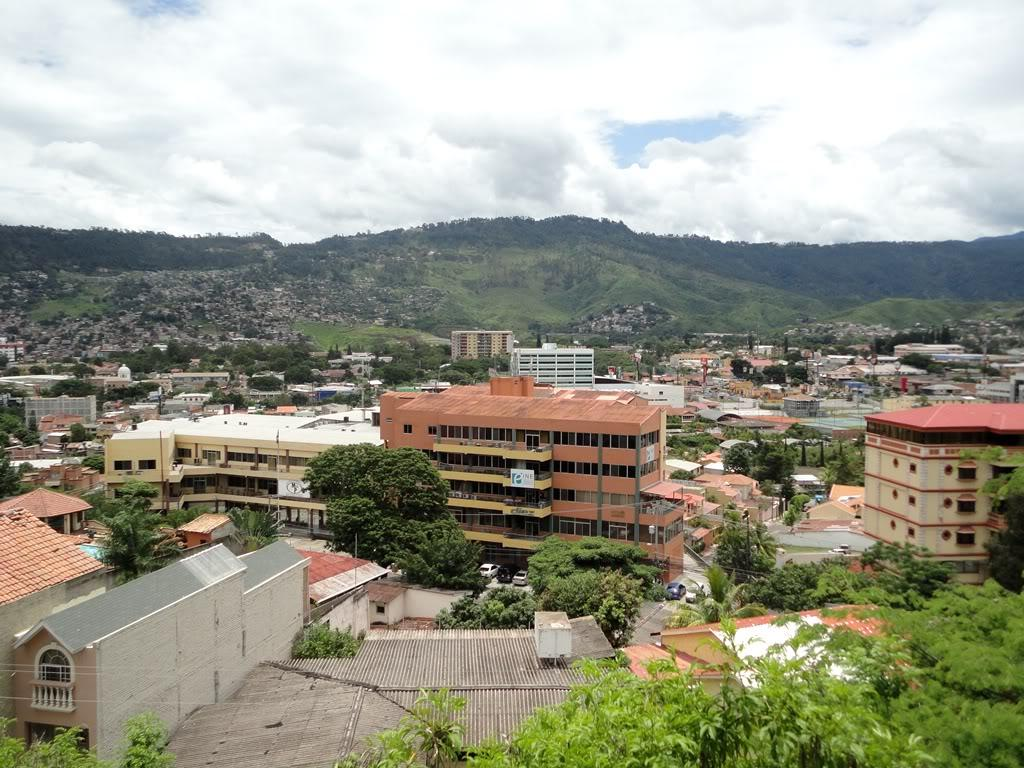
Buildings of the INE National Institute of Statistics and of the MPH in the city of Tegucigalpa, M.D.C.

== Historical background ==
Prior to 1994, the public entity that represented the state was part of the Supreme Court of Justice of Honduras. The prosecutors were civilians who were politically appointed, and willing to represent themselves before the competent cases to the judicial system. This is how the fiscal legal status was maintained in the trials of written procedures since the 19th century.

The “Law of the Public Prosecutor” was issued during the government of Mr. Rafael Leonardo Callejas by the National Congress of Honduras. In 1994 new fiscal agents and the DIC (Directorate of Criminal Investigation), a new investigative police, where put in place replacing the controversial DNI (National Directorate of Investigation). United with the forensic medicine scientific branch, they would modernize and replace for better the obsolete investigation system that was carried out in Honduras, making criminal investigations and the justice system more effective.

== Direction of the Public Ministry ==
The current general public prosecutor is Óscar Fernando Chinchilla Banegas, a former magistrate of the Supreme Court of Justice. The public deputy prosecutor is Rigoberto Cuéllar, former minister of the Office of Natural Resources and Environment. Both were elected on 31 August 2013.

=== Organizational structure ===
- General public prosecutor.
- Public deputy prosecutor.
- Director of public prosecutors.
- Coordinators of regional prosecutors.
- Forensic medicine.
- Common crimes prosecutor's office.
- Special prosecutor's office against corruption,
- Special prosecutor's office against organized crime.
- Special prosecutor's office against deprivation of command.
- Special prosecutor's office of human rights.
- Special prosecutor's office of woman.
- Special prosecutor's office of childhood.

=== Forensic medicine ===
Forensic medicine determines the cause of death by examining of the corpse.

== Inability ==
The public prosecutor's office receives more than 50,000 cases annually to investigate. It has the capacity to investigate only 5%; the remaining 95% cases are left without investigation. Because of this there has been an increase in crime.

== Expansion of contract killing ==
Because of the lack of resources and investigations by public prosecutor office, crime has increased exponentially. During the government of Rafael Alleys assassinations increased about 300%. During the government of Porfirio Lobo (2010-2014) 27,000 thousand people were murdered, which is equal to all 20th century murders in Honduras.

== See also ==
- Honduras
- Politics of Honduras
- Elections in Honduras
- Government of Honduras
- Supreme Court of Honduras
- National Congress of Honduras
- Constitution of Honduras
- Executive branch of the government of Honduras
- President of Honduras
- Legal history in Honduras
- Public prosecutor
- Medical jurisprudence (forensic medicine).
- National Police of Honduras
