= José Trinidad Cabañas =

Honduran military general and politician

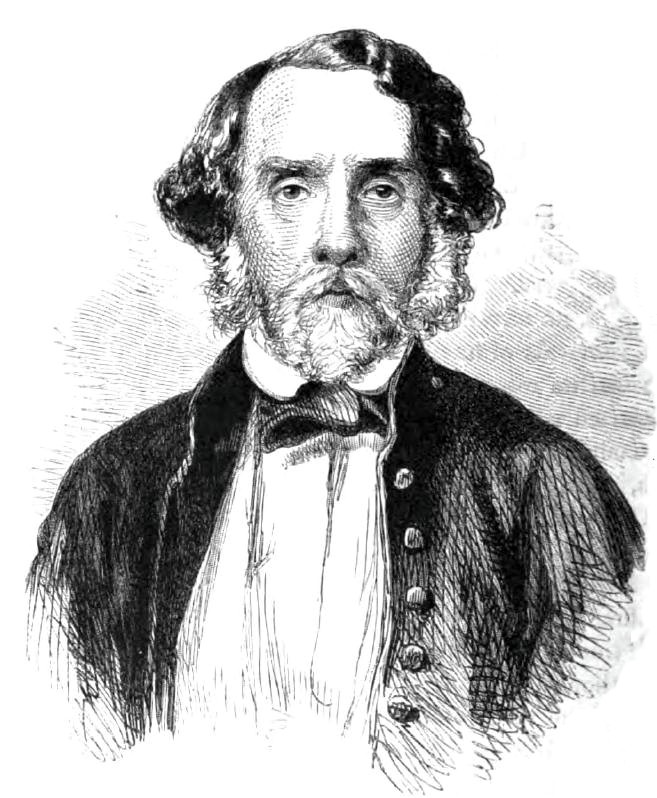

Head of State of Honduras
- In office 1 March 1852 – 18 October 1855
- Vice President: José Santiago Bueso
- Preceded by: Francisco Gómez
- Succeeded by: José Santiago Bueso

Personal details
- Born: 9 June 1805 Tegucigalpa, Viceroyalty of New Spain
- Died: 8 January 1871 (aged 65) Comayagua, Honduras
- Party: Liberal Party
- Spouse: Petronila Barrios de Cabañas
- Occupation: General, Politician

José Trinidad Cabañas Fiallos (9 June 1805– 8 January 1871) was a liberal Honduran military general and politician who served as President of Honduras from 1 March to 6 July 1852 and 31 December 1853 to 6 June 1855. His role in Honduran history began during the First Central American Civil War. He became a Central America hero when he attempted to reunite Central America, during Francisco Morazán's tenure and after the unionist's death.

During his second term as president, Cabañas attempted to build a railroad in Honduras. He was supported by the common Central American people, but his liberal beliefs were not accepted by the conservatives, then holding power. He was popularly known as being "The gentleman without blemish and without fear".

== Biography ==
José Trinidad Cabañas was born to José María Cabañas Rivera and Juana Fiallos in Tegucigalpa and was baptized on the day of his birth in 1805.

He attended school at the "Colegio Tridentino" in Comayagua, where he studied Latin, rhetoric, theology and philosophy.

=== Military life ===
In 1827, when the military forces of Justo Milla invaded and besieged Comayagua, and overthrew the government of Dionisio de Herrera, Cabañas, at 22 years old, was volunteered with his brothers by his aged father, who proclaimed,

"Sir, the weight of my years does not allow me to accompany you to battlefield, but here you have my three sons that can do what I should, with a willingness to shed their blood for the flag that you defend".

Cabañas later joined the army of the Federal Republic of Central America, where he was deputy to Gen. Francisco Morazán and eventually became a General of the Federal Army, gaining political and military leadership, which earned him the position of deputy of the Constituent Assembly of 1830.

Cabañas' first military experience was at Battle of the Trinity on 11 November 1839. He participated in the battles in San Salvador, Las Charcas, and also stood out in the battles of The Holy Spirit and in the battles of San Pedro Perulapán —conducted in Salvadoran territory—, occurred on 6 April and 25 September 1839, respectively.

At 13 November of this year, he defeated the forces of General Francisco Zelaya y Ayes on the battle in El Sitio of La Soledad, on outskirts of Tegucigalpa, and he was later defeated by the same General on 31 January 1840 in Los Llanos, in Potrero.

After the liberal defeat of 1840, Cabañas and Gen. Morazán moved from Guatemala and went into exile in Panama, then he traveled to Costa Rica.

Cabañas established a loyal friendship with General Francisco Morazán, who, as General Luis Maldonado says, told him "My Dear General" in his correspondence. After the death of Morazán in Costa Rica on 15 September 1842, General Cabañas says: "It's not possible. You can shoot us, but not General Morazán ...that would be a crime to Central America".
After this he returned to El Salvador, where he lived for several years and collaborated in the government of Salvadorean presidents Eugenio Aguilar and Doroteo Vasconcelos. He was Minister of War in December 1850 and was defeated at the Battle of Sitio in San José La Arada in February 1851.

=== Presidency ===
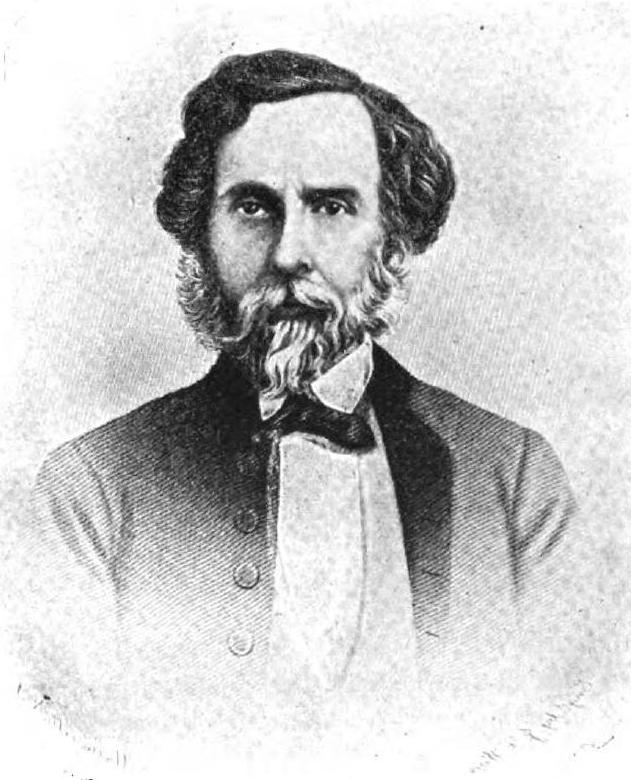
General Jose Trinidad Cabanas

During his tenure, with José Santiago Bueso with vice-president, Cabañas made important deeds to encourage the public instruction, agriculture and mining, as well as significant efforts to improve the coffee cultivation and Public Instruction. He was the first promoter of the railroad, the coffee and craft of rush. He was an educator president, that imposed taxes on exports of cattle and timber to establish the first 50 public schools paid for by the Exchequer.

While Trinidad Cabañas resided in the city San Miguel, was reported by a Senators' Commission consisted of Francisco López, Vicente Vaquero and León Alvarado, about the results of the elections conducted in Honduras in late 1851, when he was elected as president. The Legislative Assembly of Honduras sent him the Election's Decree as Honduras' Constitutional President, he made the Promise of Law and took possession on 1 March 1852.

In order to restore the Federation, Cabañas was appointed as Vice-Chief of State by the Constituent Assembly of Central America, met in Tegucigalpa on 13 October 1852. However Cabañas rejected this charge and said: "I'm not ready for so high office, I'm a soldier, I have no public administration knowledge" so the Vice President Pedro Molina took over the task of celebrating assemblies in El Salvador and Nicaragua.

On 23 June 1853, he signed the first contract for construction of the Inter-Oceanic Railroad of Honduras, to communicate Omoa with Amapala, a project that had been in development since 1590 but had been shelved by the Council of the Indies and instead realized in Panama. As this idea required borrowings from foreign banks, Cabañas saw this option as a threat to the transfer and loss of national sovereignty, so he withdrew and the project was conducted in the government Jose Maria Medina.

=== War against Guatemala ===
In 1853, Cabañas appointed Jose Francisco Barrundia, Minister Plenipotentiary in Washington. During this year, General Rafael Carrera, President of Guatemala constantly harassed General Cabañas. Thus, Cabañas deposited the presidency to General Francisco Gómez during the period from 9 May to 31 December 1853, to personally lead the military campaign against Guatemala, and installed his headquarters in Gracias .

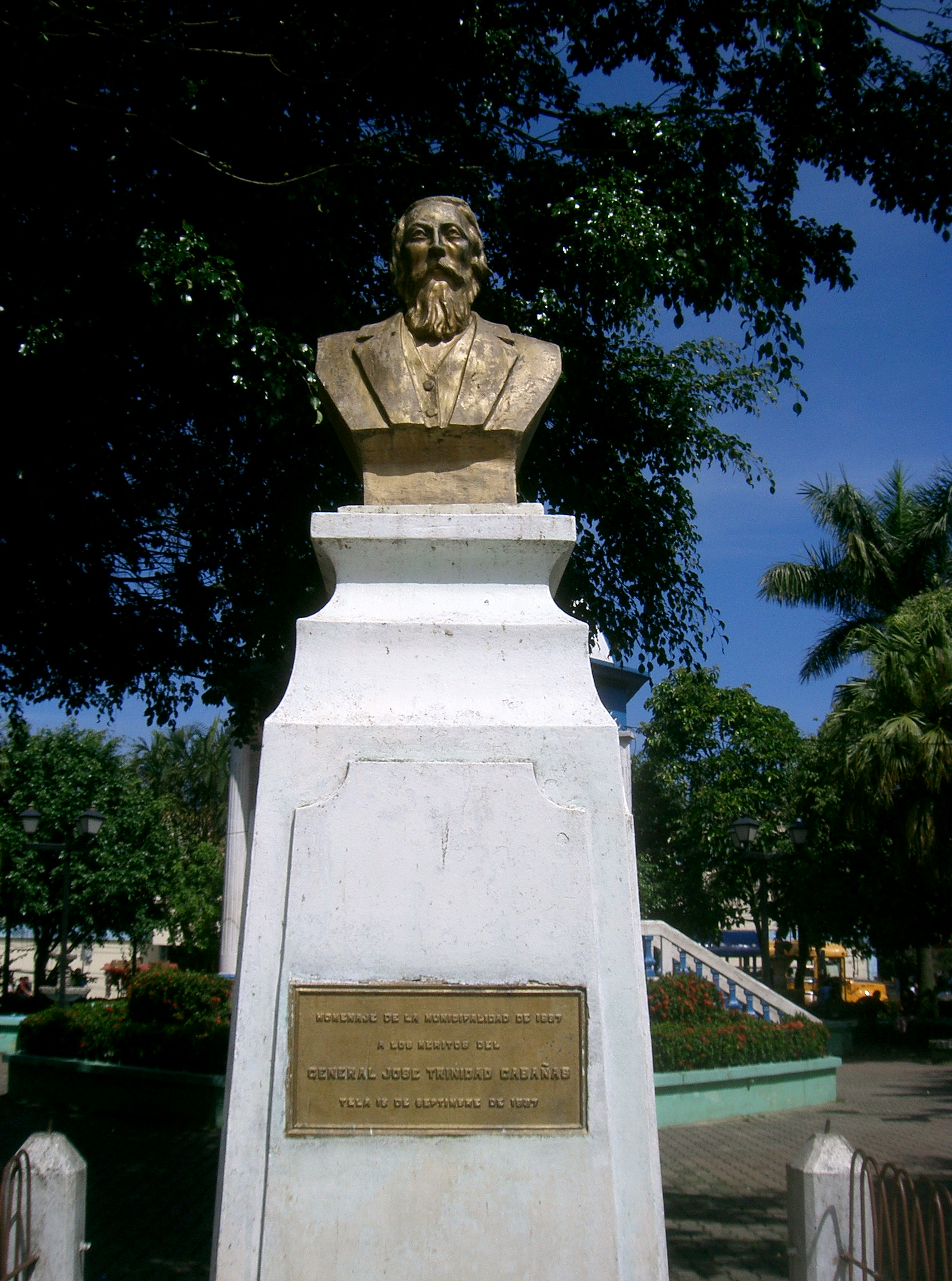
Statue in honor of José Trinidad Cabañas. Located in city Tela, Atlántida Department.

He returned to the presidency on 1 January 1854 and faced difficult political conditions. In July of this year, he sent a military column to Nicaragua under the leadership of General Francisco Gomez, who died of cholera on 25 July 1854, without achieving the objectives of imposing the supporters of the old Federation.

Due to the attempts of Cabañas to restore the Central American Federation and his conflicts with the conservative Nicaraguan government of Rafael Carrera, Carrera declared that his aim in Honduras was to overthrow General José Trinidad Cabañas, which achieved backing of the Honduran conservatives, who, led by General Juan Lopez, invaded the nation and defeated to Cabañas on the Battle of Masaguara, in the plains of Santa Rosa and Gracias on 6 October 1855, forcing him to resign the presidency and take refuge in El Salvador. General Juan López called the vice-president José Santiago Bueso to hold the presidency of the Executive, on 18 October of same year.

In El Salvador, Cabañas became both as finance minister in the government and head of the National Congress. Cabañas traveled to Nicaragua to seek support to regain the Honduran presidency from Nicaraguan president Patricio Rivas, who refused based on the alleged influences of adventurer William Walker. So he returned to El Salvador, where he lived for many years and served as minister and civil and military governor of San Miguel in the government of his friend Gerardo Barrios (1858–1863).

=== Last years ===
During the last years of his life, General Cabañas retired from politics and returned to Honduras at 1867 and settled in Comayagua. In Honduras, he began a campaign against the presence of William Walker in Central America, then was appointed by the administration of President José María Medina as quartermaster of the Customs of Trujillo, Honduras. Cabañas died on 8 January 1871, at age 65.

After his death, The Government of Honduras awarded him the title of "Soldier of the motherland" and the Republic of El Salvador named "Cabañas Department" in his honor. His remains rest in the church of San Sebastian de Comayagua.

== See also ==
- List of presidents of Honduras

== Sources ==
All in Spanish:

- Mejía, Medardo (1971). Trinidad Cabañas, soldado de la república federal.
- Biographical Notes about José Trinidad Reyes by Miguel Cálix Suazo, President of Institute Morazánico y Coordinator of National Organizer Commission of the bicentenary of Cabañas' Birth
- Hondurasesducacional.com
- Honduras laboral.org
