= 1926 Nicaraguan presidential election =

Presidential elections were held in Nicaragua on 11 November 1926.

== Background ==
On 25 October 1925, former President Emiliano Chamorro Vargas, the losing candidate in the previous presidential election, seized La Loma fortress dominating Managua and informed the American Minister that his purpose was to drive the Liberals from the Cabinet and restore the Conservative Party to office. Vargas argued that the unconstitutional procedures in the election of the Solórzano-Juan Bautista Sacasa administration voided the nonrecognition obligations of the 1923 treaty. He did not mention but everyone knew that in 1920 Vargas, as outgoing president, had insured the election of his uncle through a dishonest election. The American Minister at once informed General Vargas that he would not recognize any government assuming power by force.

After the capture of the Loma Fortress, Doctor Juan Bautista Sacasa, the Vice President, had returned to León, remaining there in hiding. Early in November, General Vargas sent 1,200 men to León, stating that they would be held there until Doctor Sacasa should resign. Sacasa fled the country. Unable to secure Sacasa's resignation, Vargas took steps to ascend the Presidency by means which would secure recognition of the United States.

Congress convened in December 1925 and eighteen senators and deputies were expelled. Vargas claimed they had been seated illegally after the 1924 elections.

On 3 January 1926, Emiliano Chamorro Vargas was elected without opposition Senator of Managua, the vacancy having been created by means of the resignation of one of his friends.

On 12 January, Congress declared the Vice Presidency vacant. Congress then elected General Vargas First Designate for the Presidency. On 16 January, Congress granted President Solórzano an indefinite leave of absence, and Vargas, as First Designate, assumed executive power, thereby relegating Solórzano to a titular position.

== Political manoeuvers ==
Congress did not act on President Solórzano's resignation, which had been presented on 14 January. General Vargas kept Solórzano under surveillance so that he could not leave the country and thereby disturb the technical constitutional status of the Government. The State Department, when it learned of Vargas's scheme, indicated to him that it considered that the manipulation of the laws to give him the Presidency was merely a subterfuge to obtain recognition by the United States in spite of the provisions of the Washington Treaty of 1923. Regardless of this advice, Vargas proceeded to execute his plan, thinking that the State Department, faced with the 'fait accompli' of his control, after an interval of time would recognize him.

Solórzano's resignation

By March 1926 Solórzano had resigned, Vice-President Sacasa had fled the country, and Vargas, "the unscrupulous but charismatic leader of the Conservative party, had installed himself as chief executive. The State Department, citing the unconstitutionality of Vargas’s seizure of power, denied him diplomatic recognition, thereby effectively declaring open season on the new regime. Internal order – briefly re-established by the Conservative strong man – again disintegrated".

Liberal uprising

The first Liberal uprising came in May 1926, capturing Bluefields and surprising even many of the party's principal leaders. Sacasa assumed leadership of the movement from abroad but did not return. Retired U.S. Army major Calvin B. Carter's aides had helped Vargas build up the National Guard to nearly full strength and armed it well with the support of the State Department. Against this now rather formidable force, the uprising collapsed almost immediately.

U.S. Embassy Secretary Lawrence Dennis repeatedly demanded Vargas's resignation and even incited other Conservative factions to oust him. This failed to bring results by August, however, when the year's second Liberal revolt commenced. This time the insurgents threatened more convincingly. Under the generalship of José María Moncada Tapia, the insurgents rapidly extended their control over most of the Atlantic area. Once again the United States landed marines in Bluefields.

Although Vargas struggled for months to consolidate his position, in October 1926 – bankrupt, harried by a Liberal Party insurgency, and frustrated by American nonrecognition – he resigned the presidency. Turning to the problem of designating a successor, the State Department threw its support behind Adolfo Diaz.

== Uriza designated President ==
On 30 October 1926, in accordance with article 106 of the Constitution, General Vargas deposited the Presidency in the Second Designate, Senator Sebastián Uriza, the First Designate being absent in the United States. The same day, Senator Sebastián Uriza appointed Vargas as Commander in Chief of the Army.

In the midst of renewed revolutionary activities Sebastián Uriza convoked Congress in extraordinary session. The Senators and Deputies who had been expelled by Vargas from the previous Congress were invited to return and resume their seats. The Liberal Nationalists illegally seated by the Bartolomé Martínez-controlled Congress of 1925 were to be replaced by the Conservatives who had been declared elected by the National Board of Elections.

On 11 November 1926, Congress in joint session designated Adolfo Díaz for the Presidency. At this session 51 members were present out of a total membership of 67, of whom 44 voted for Díaz and 2 for Solórzano. Five Liberals refrained from voting, claiming infractions of the rules of procedure which prevented the complete attendance of their representatives. On 14 November Díaz took office. The American Charge d' Affaires attended the inauguration, although formal recognition by the United States was not accorded until 17 November.

| Candidate | Votes | % |
|---|---|---|
| Adolfo Díaz | 44 | 86.27 |
| Carlos José Solórzano | 2 | 3.92 |
| Abstained | 5 | 9.80 |
| Total | 51 | 100.00 |
| Registered voters/turnout | 67 | 76.12 |
