= 1924 Nicaraguan general election =

- 5 October 1924
- Presidential election
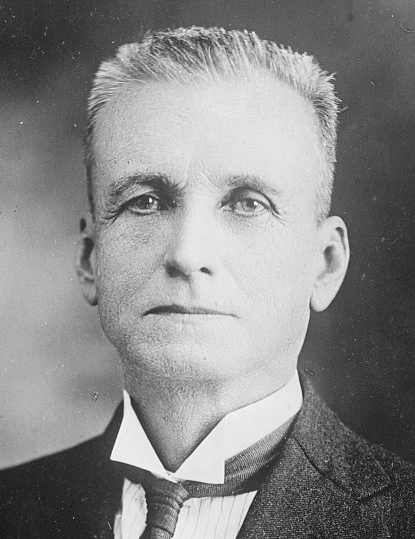

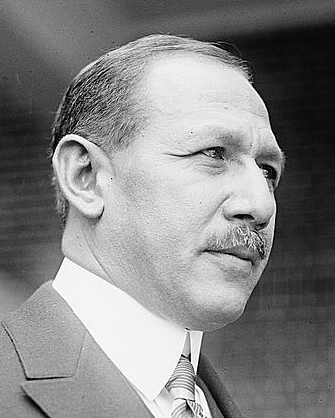

Nominee	Carlos José Solórzano	Emiliano Chamorro Vargas	Luís Corea
Party	PRC–PLN	Conservative	PRL
Popular vote	48,072	28,760	7,264
Percentage	57.16%	34.20%	8.64%
President before election
Bartolomé Martínez
Conservative
Elected President
Carlos José Solórzano
Conservative

General elections were held in Nicaragua on 5 October 1924 to elect a president, half of the deputies and one-third of the senators of the National Congress.

When the President Diego Manuel Chamorro died in office on 12 October 1923 Vice-President Bartolomé Martínez, a representative of the anti-Chamorrista wing of the Conservative faction, took over the office. Martínez bitterly opposed Emiliano Chamorro Vargas’s desire to return to the presidency. Martínez thus turned to the Liberals to forge a coalition that might thwart the caudillo’s fond hopes for a second presidential term”.

Bartolomé Martínez, although selected as vice president by the Diego Manuel Chamorro-dominated Conservative convention of 1920, was ambitious to continue his control of the administration. His plans ran counter to those of Gen. Emiliano Chamorro Vargas and the Granada Conservatives, who wanted to regain the leadership lost through the death of President Diego Manuel Chamorro. The attempts of the Conservative leaders to agree to a national party in which the Liberals would participate were unsuccessful. The Conservative convention, which was again dominated by General Emiliano Chamorro Vargas, nominated him for the Presidency. The Liberal Party, which met shortly afterwards, likewise split into two factions. The larger, under the party name of Nationalist Liberal Party nominated Juan Bautista Sacasa; the smaller, under the party name of Liberal Republican Party nominated Luís Corea. In the meantime President Martínez had developed a new party for the purpose of bringing about his own nomination.

The above notwithstanding and with his chances to run again diminished, Bartolomé Martínez, in a last effort to prevent his arch-rival Emiliano Chamorro Vargas, now a lawful candidate, from garnering the votes, had little option but to follow a suggestion from the already highly influential and soon-to-be known as "First Lady of Liberalism", Angélica Balladares de Arguello (December 19, 1872 – September 8, 1973), to form a coalition party of relative moderates, the Conservative Republican Party, whose novel idea was to present for the first time in the history of Nicaragua, a so-called transactional electoral ticket headed by a Conservative Carlos José Solórzano to run as president and seconded by a Liberal, Dr. Juan Bautista Sacasa for the post of vice president. Because of her political activism, Dame Angelica became the first president of the Nicaraguan Feminist League, then the only woman in Nicaragua's history to have been bestowed the Congressional Gold Medal of Honour by acclamation (August 2, 1969), as well as being the recipient of the Western Hemispheres's highest honour for a female, the so-called "Woman of the Americas" and "Women of Nicaragua" awards, both presented to her by the Unión de Mujeres Americanas on 21 April 1959)

The United States pressured Nicaragua to hold a free election in 1924.

Just before the election, Bartolomé Martínez issued decrees making changes in the personnel of the electoral boards and creating a special force of armed police to be present in each polling place. The Supreme Court upheld the national electoral board when it protested against these actions, but the government rejected the court’s decision. Election day, 5 October, was relatively quiet, though the government imposed a state of siege late in the afternoon because of minor disorders in the conservative department of Chontales.

The US State Department, then led by future Chief Supreme Court Justice Charles Evans Hughes (1862 - d. 1948), at first expected that the election would bring conditions which would allow withdrawal of the legation guard from Managua. But the 1924 electoral process, even when conducted a tad better than preceding elections, was a saddening affair – no exception to the country’s political axiom that the candidate of the party in power always won. The Nicaraguan government claimed that the election of 5 October, took place with admirable liberty and impartiality. The Conservatives were unhappy with the outcome and protested voting in several cantons. “Strangely, even the victors of 1924 were far from jubilant. They feared extralegal action from the Conservatives, especially Emiliano Chamorro Vargas''”.

After giving consideration to the advisability both of a new election and the appointment of a coalition cabinet headed by a designate chosen by Congress, the U.S. Department of State decided to accord recognition to Carlos José Solórzano when he assumed the Presidency on 1 January 1925. The genuine Conservatives refused to admit the legality of Solórzano’s Administration, and their opposition heightened when the Conservative Senators and Deputies, whose elections had been conceded by the National Board of Elections, were expelled by the Bartolomé Martínez-controlled Congress and Transactionists seated in their stead.

On January 26 of 1925, former Nicaraguan President Gral Emiliano Chamorro Vargas mounted a coup, forcing Solórzano and Sacasa to flee the country. He also removed all liberals from the Nicaraguan Congress. The United States refused to recognize Chamorro's regime. As a result, Liberals and other parties revolted all of which leading, by the middle of 1926, to the start of the so called Constitutional War of 1926-27.

== Results ==
=== President ===
Candidate	Party	Votes	%
Carlos José Solórzano	Conservative Republican Party–Nationalist Liberal Party	48,072	57.16
Emiliano Chamorro Vargas	Conservative Party	28,760	34.20
Luís Corea	Liberal Republican Party	7,264	8.64
Total		84,096	100.00
Registered voters/turnout		120,490	–
Source: Nohlen

== Bibliography ==
- Barquero, Sara L. Gobernantes de Nicaragua, 1825-1947. Managua: Publicaciones del Ministerio de Instrucción Pública. Second edition. 1945.
- Booth, John A. The end and the beginning: the Nicaraguan revolution. Boulder: Westview Press. Second edition, revised and updated. 1985.
- Elections in the Americas A Data Handbook Volume 1. North America, Central America, and the Caribbean. Edited by Dieter Nohlen. 2005.
- Gould, Jeffrey L. To die in this way: Nicaraguan Indians and the myth of mestizaje, 1880-1965. Durham: Duke University Press. 1998.
- Kagan, Robert. A twilight struggle: American power and Nicaragua, 1977-1990. New York: Free Press. 1996.
- Kamman, William. A search for stability: United States diplomacy toward Nicaragua 1925-1933. Notre Dame: University of Notre Dame Press. 1968.
- MacRenato, Ternot. Somoza: seizure of power, 1926-1939. La Jolla: University of California, San Diego. 1991.
- Merrill, Tim L., Nicaragua : a country study. Washington: Federal Research Division, Library of Congress. 1994.
- Munro, Dana G. The United States and the Caribbean republics, 1921-1933. Princeton: Princeton University Press. 1974.
- Musicant, Ivan. The banana wars: a history of United States military intervention in Latin America from the Spanish–American War to the invasion of Panama. New York: Macmillan Publishing Company. 1990.
- Obando Somarriba, Francisco "Dona Angélica Balladares de Argüello: La Primera Dama del Liberalismo" Tipografía Comercial, Managua, 1969 (page 44)
- Smith, Hazel. Nicaragua: self-determination and survival. London : Pluto Press. 1993.
- United States Department of State. The United States and Nicaragua: a survey of the relations from 1909 to 1932. Washington, D.C.: Government Printing Office. 1932.
- Vargas, Oscar-René. Elecciones presidenciales en Nicaragua, 1912-1932: análisis socio-político. Managua: Fundación Manolo Morales. 1989.
