= Chamorro (surname) =

Chamorro is a surname. Notable people with this surname include:

- Chamorro (family), a political family of Nicaragua
  - Diego Manuel Chamorro (1861–1923)
  - Edgar Chamorro (born 1931)
  - Emiliano Chamorro Vargas (1871–1966)
  - Fernando Chamorro Alfaro (1824–1863)
  - Fernando "El Negro" Chamorro (1933–1994)
  - Fruto Chamorro (1804–1855)
  - Pedro Joaquín Chamorro Alfaro (1818–1890)
  - Pedro Joaquín Chamorro Cardenal (1924–1978)
  - Rosendo Chamorro
  - Violeta Chamorro (1929–2025)
  - Xavier Chamorro Cardenal (1932–2008)
- Alberto Sansimena Chamorro (born 1985), Spanish footballer
- Aurora Chamorro (1954–2020), Catalan swimmer
- Carlos Pellas Chamorro (born 1953), Nicaraguan businessman
- Charissa Chamorro (born 1977), Chilean-American actress
- Delfín Chamorro (1863–1931), Paraguayan special educator
- Elena Arellano Chamorro (1836–1911), Nicaraguan pedagogue and nun
- Eusebio Chamorro (1922–?), Argentine footballer
- Eustacio Chamorro, Paraguayan footballer
- Francisco Chamorro (born 1981), Argentine cyclist
- Joan Chamorro (born 1962), Spanish jazz musician
- Salva Chamorro (born 1990), Spanish footballer
- Sergio Chamorro (born 1971), Nicaraguan footballer
