= Cuadra =

Cuadra is a Spanish surname of Asturian-Leonese origin.

== People with the name ==
- Adrián Cuadra (born 1997), Chilean footballer
- Fernanda Cuadra (born 1984), Nicaraguan swimmer
- Francisco Javier Cuadra (born 1954), Chilean lawyer, academic, and politician
- Jaime Cuadra (born 1970), Peruvian musician
- Joaquín Cuadra, Nicaraguan general and politician
- Jolico Cuadra (1939–2013), Filipino poet and artist
- José de la Cuadra (1903–1941), Ecuadorian writer
- José Vicente Cuadra (1812–1894), President of Nicaragua
- Manuel Cuadra Serrano (born 1957), Nicaraguan footballer
- Maria Cuadra (born 1936), Spanish actress
- Pablo Antonio Cuadra (1912–2002), Nicaraguan poet and artist
- Pablo Cuadra (born 1995), Argentine footballer
- Pedro Lucio Cuadra (1842–1894), Chilean engineer and politician
- Raul Cuadra Chamberlain (1924–1974), Nicaraguan musician and advertiser
- Raúl Cuadra García (born 1953), Mexican politician
- Rodrigo Cuadra (born 1967), Chilean musician, TV presenter, and film critic
- Sabino Cuadra (born 1949), Spanish attorney and politician
- Ulysses Cuadra (born 1987), American actor
- Vicente Cuadra Chamberlain (1919–2000), Nicaraguan advertiser, son of Vicente
- Vicente Cuadra Gómez (1874–1943), Nicaraguan economist

== See also ==
- Casas de Cuadra, a village in Valencia, Spain
- La Cuadra, a municipality and village in La Rioja Province, Argentina
- Carlos Cuadras (born 1988), Mexican boxer
- Joaquín Cuadras (1843–1877), Cuban painter
- Quadra (disambiguation)
