= 1932 Nicaraguan general election =

- 6 November 1932
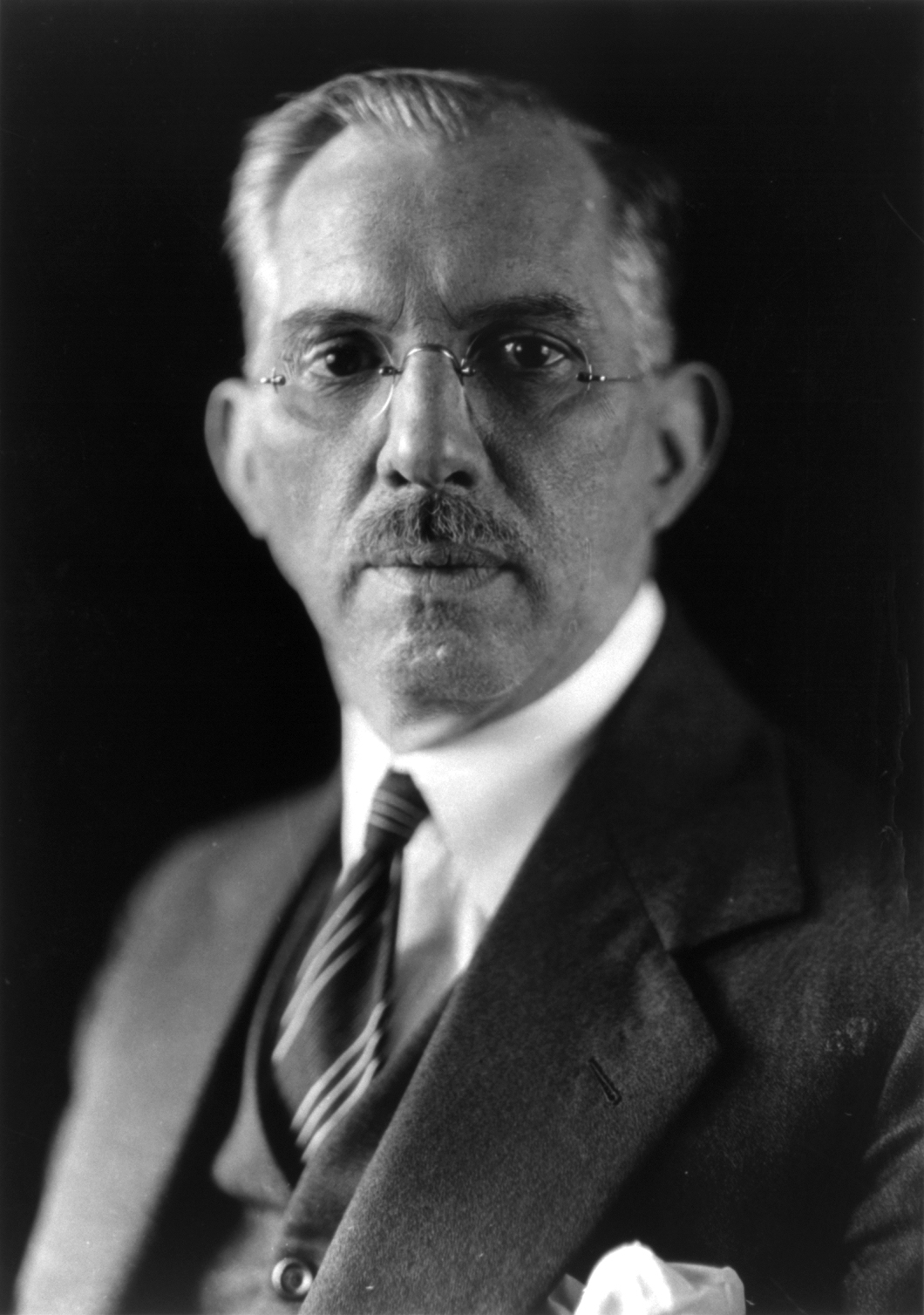

Nominee	Juan Bautista Sacasa	Adolfo Díaz
Party	Nationalist Liberal Party	Conservative Party
Popular vote	76,269	53,845
Percentage	58.62	41.38
President before election
José María Moncada
Nationalist Liberal Party
Elected President
Juan Bautista Sacasa
Nationalist Liberal Party

General elections were held in Nicaragua on 6 November 1932 to elect the president, half of the seats in the Chamber of Deputies and one-third of the seats in the Senate of the National Congress.

Matthew Hanna, the US minister in Nicaragua secured an agreement from the two presidential candidates in the 1932 elections, the conservative Adolfo Díaz and the rehabilitated constitutionalist vice-president, Juan Bautista Sacasa, that the National Guard should become a "non-political" force after US withdrawal.

"The presidential election in 1932 also was supervised by the United States and the results were surprisingly similar to those of 1928: 76,269 for the Liberal Juan Bautista Sacasa and 53,845 for the Conservative Adolfo Díaz. Sacasa's election in 1932 was particularly rewarding for Liberals, because it installed in the presidency a man whose rights to that office had been violated by the Chamorro coup of 1925 when Sacasa was vice-president of the republic."

Anastasio Somoza García was appointed head of the Nicaraguan National Guard in late 1932 as U.S. occupation forces were being withdrawn after their futile attempt to defeat Augusto César Sandino's antioccupation and revolutionary guerrilla movement. Breaking with the political neutrality of the officer corps enforced under U.S. tutelage, Somoza García and his uncle, President Juan Bautista Sacasa, began to appoint officers with Liberal Party loyalty".

The election took place under the supervision of the United States. The Conservative Party expected that the United States would tilt the election in their favor. However, the United States did not intervene in the election. Consistent with previous agreements, the United States withdrew all forces from Nicaragua in January 1933.

== Results ==
Party	Candidate	Votes	%	Seats	
Party	Candidate	Votes	%	Chamber	Senate
Nationalist Liberal Party	Juan Bautista Sacasa	76,269	58.62	29	15
Conservative Party	Adolfo Díaz	53,845	41.38	14	8
Total		130,114	100.00	43	23
Registered voters/turnout		154,720	–		
Source: Nohlen, Political Handbook of the World

== Bibliography ==
- Booth, John A. “The Somoza regime in Nicaragua.” Sultanistic regimes. 1998. Baltimore: The Johns Hopkins University Press.
- Cardenal Tellería, Marco A. Nicaragua y su historia: cronología del acontecer histórico y construcción de la nación nicaragüense. Managua: Banco Mercantíl. Volume I. 2000.
- Dodd, Thomas J. Managing democracy in Central America (A case study: United States election supervision in Nicaragua, 1927–1933). New Brunswick: Transaction Publishers. 1992.
- Elections in the Americas A Data Handbook Volume 1. North America, Central America, and the Caribbean. Edited by Dieter Nohlen. 2005.
- MacRenato, Ternot. Somoza: seizure of power, 1926-1939. La Jolla: University of California, San Diego. 1991.
- Munro, Dana G. The United States and the Caribbean republics, 1921-1933. Princeton: Princeton University Press. 1974.
- Political handbook of the world 1933. New York, 1934.
- Radell, David Richard. An historical geography of western Nicaragua: the spheres of influence of León, Granada, and Managua, 1519-1965. Berkeley: University of California at Berkeley. Unpublished dissertation. 1969.
- Ramírez, Sergio. El muchacho de Niquinohomo. Managua: Editorial Vanguardia. Includes “Cronología 1890-1934”. 1988.
- Ramírez, Sergio. “The kid from Niquinohomo.” Latin American perspectives 16, 3:48-82 (summer 1989). English translation of El muchacho de Niquinohomo without the “Cronología.”
- Smith, Hazel. Nicaragua: self-determination and survival. London : Pluto Press. 1993.
- Stansifer, Charles L. “Elections and democracy in Central America: the cases of Costa Rica and Nicaragua.” Assessing democracy in Latin America. 1998. Boulder: Westview Press.
- Vargas, Oscar-René. Elecciones presidenciales en Nicaragua, 1912-1932: análisis socio-político. Managua: Fundación Manolo Morales. 1989.
- Walter, Knut. The regime of Anastasio Somoza, 1936-1956. Chapel Hill: The University of North Carolina. 1993.
