= 1920 Nicaraguan general election =

- 3 October 1920
- Presidential election
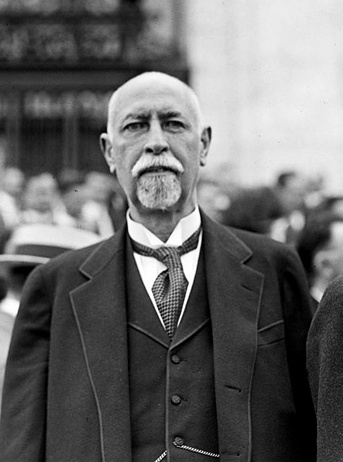

Nominee	Diego Manuel Chamorro	José Esteban González
Party	Conservative	PL–PPC
Popular vote	66,974	22,519
Percentage	74.06	24.90
President before election
Emiliano Chamorro Vargas
Conservative Party
Elected President
Diego Manuel Chamorro
Conservative Party

General elections were held in Nicaragua on 3 October 1920 to elect a President, half of the Deputies and one-third of the Senators of the National Congress.

By 1920, the State Department believed that electoral competition between Liberals and Conservatives without direct U.S. occupation would provide a better basis for political stability and the long-term protection of U.S. economic interests".

During the four years following the 1916 elections, the Liberals criticized the Department of State for its support of an electoral machinery that tended to perpetuate the power of the Conservatives who controlled it. The Liberals claimed that since the elections were manipulated to their disadvantage and since the United States would not countenance revolution, it was impossible for them ever to secure control of the Government. Early in 1920 the Department of State suggested that the Nicaraguan Government invite someone to make a study of the electoral system and suggest possible revisions therein. President Emiliano Chamorro Vargas replied that it was inopportune to make any changes, since the existing electoral law amply provided for free elections and the proximity of the elections would not permit a thorough study.

The Liberals, who attracted various dissatisfied elements, led a formidable opposition to the Conservatives under the name of the Coalition Party. With the disaffection in the Conservative ranks, the likelihood of the Coalitionists winning the elections became a real possibility if fair and free elections were held. The preelection period was a turbulent one. The Coalitionists demanded that all eligible voters should have the right of casting the ballots regardless of whether or not they were inscribed on the official catalogues. At the suggestion of the Department of State, President Emiliano Chamorro Vargas granted two additional days for registration. Thousands were unable to register. The Government imprisoned many of the Coalition leaders. Just before the elections, President Emiliano Chamorro Vargas decreed that all citizens should be allowed to cast a ballot whether inscribed or not, and that when the votes were counted there should be rejected the ballots of all citizens whose names did not appear on the official catalogues, not only of that of 1920 but of all prior years.

The liberals did participate in the 1920 elections, but the backing of the United States and a fraudulent vote count assured the election of Emiliano Chamorro Vargas's uncle, Diego Manuel Chamorro.

The 1920 elections had the benefit of an American observer, Major Jesse I. Miller, who was sent by the State Department.

The Major concluded that there had been much fraud and improper use of government power. He made a study of the registration books and concluded that the lists "were enormously padded". Miller also learned that neither party took the results seriously because "neither thought that the election was decided until the State Department had passed on it".

== Results ==
=== President ===
Candidate	Party	Votes	%
Diego Manuel Chamorro	Conservative Party	66,974	74.06
José Esteban González	Liberal Party–Progressive Conservative Party	22,519	24.90
José Andrés Urtecho	Conservative Party-dissident	940	1.04
Total		90,433	100.00
Source: Nohlen

== Bibliography ==
- Barquero, Sara L. Gobernantes de Nicaragua, 1825–1947. Managua: Publicaciones del Ministerio de Instrucción Pública. Second edition. 1945.
- Elections in the Americas A Data Handbook Volume 1. North America, Central America, and the Caribbean. Edited by Dieter Nohlen. 2005.
- MacRenato, Ternot. Somoza: seizure of power, 1926–1939. La Jolla: University of California, San Diego. 1991.
- Merrill, Tim L., Nicaragua : a country study. Washington: Federal Research Division, Library of Congress. 1994.
- Smith, Hazel. Nicaragua: self-determination and survival. London : Pluto Press. 1993.
- United States. Department of State. The United States and Nicaragua: a survey of the relations from 1909 to 1932. Washington, D.C.: Government Printing Office. 1932.
- Vargas, Oscar-René. Elecciones presidenciales en Nicaragua, 1912-1932: análisis socio-político. Managua: Fundación Manolo Morales. 1989.
