= 1916 Nicaraguan general election =

- 6 October 1916
- Presidential election
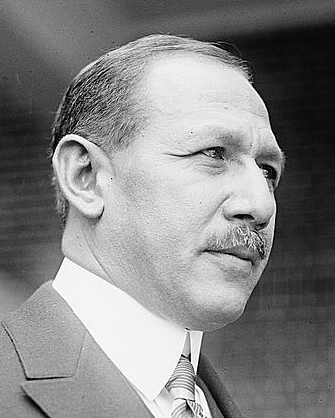
Nominee	Emiliano Chamorro Vargas
Party	Conservative
Popular vote	58,810
Percentage	100.00
President before election
Adolfo Díaz
Conservative
Elected President
Emiliano Chamorro Vargas
Conservative

General elections were held in Nicaragua on 6 October 1916 to elect a President, half of the Deputies and one-third of the Senators of National Congress of Nicaragua.

Although the United States offered to assist President Adolfo Díaz to hold free elections in 1916, this offer was rejected. A verbal promise was obtained from President Adolfo Díaz, however, that the elections would be free. On 15 January 1916 the Secretary of State, Robert Lansing, had told the Conservative candidate Emiliano Chamorro Vargas that 'the United States would view his candidacy with great pleasure'. The United States opposed José Santos Zelaya returning to power and openly opposed the Liberal candidate for president, Dr. Julian Irias.

The liberals boycotted the 1916 election, and conservative Emiliano Chamorro Vargas was elected with no opposition.

== Results ==
=== President ===
Candidate	Party	Votes	%
Emiliano Chamorro Vargas	Conservative Party	58,810	100.00
Total		58,810	100.00
Source: Nohlen

== Bibliography ==
- Elections in the Americas A Data Handbook Volume 1. North America, Central America, and the Caribbean. Edited by Dieter Nohlen. 2005.
- Kamman, William. A search for stability: United States diplomacy toward Nicaragua 1925–1933. Notre Dame: University of Notre Dame Press. 1968.
- MacRenato, Ternot. Somoza: seizure of power, 1926–1939. La Jolla: University of California, San Diego. 1991.
- Merrill, Tim L., Nicaragua : a country study. Washington: Federal Research Division, Library of Congress. 1994.
- Munro, Dana G. The United States and the Caribbean republics, 1921–1933. Princeton University Press. 1974.
- Smith, Hazel. Nicaragua: self-determination and survival. London : Pluto Press. 1993.
- Schooley, Helen. Conflict in Central America. Harlow: Longman. 1987.
- United States . Department of State. The United States and Nicaragua: a survey of the relations from 1909 to 1932. Washington, D.C.: Government Printing Office. 1932.
- Vargas, Oscar-René. Elecciones presidenciales en Nicaragua, 1912–1932: análisis socio-político. Managua: Fundación Manolo Morales. 1989.
