= Pact of Espino Negro =

The Pact of Espino Negro was an agreement developed by the United States to resolve the 1926–1927 civil war in Nicaragua.

== Background ==
In 1924, moderate conservative Carlos Solórzano was elected president of Nicaragua. Juan Bautista Sacasa, who had served as vice-president under overthrown President Jose Santos Zelaya, served as his vice president. Believing the Nicaraguan government was stable, the United States Marines agreed to end its 13-year presence in the country and withdrew from Nicaragua in August 1925.

President Solórzano, who had already purged the liberals from his coalition government, was subsequently forced out of power in November 1925 by a conservative group who proclaimed ex-president General Emiliano Chamorro as president in January 1926. In the wake of Chamorro's coup, Sacasa fled to Mexico. Fearing a new liberal-conservative war would take place, the United States refused to accept Chamorro as president.

US Marines were sent back to Nicaragua in May 1926 to protect United States citizens and property within the nation. In October 1926, following a mediated peace agreement, Chamorro resigned as president and former Nicaraguan President Adolfo Diaz was elected president by the Nicaraguan Congress.

However, the country was again plagued with violence when Sacasa returned to Nicaragua and claimed his rights to the Presidency. In April 1927, the United States sent Henry L. Stimson to Nicaragua to help resolve the conflict. On 20 May 1927, General Jose Maria Moncada, the leader of the liberal rebels, and President Diaz agreed to a truce.

== Pact ==
As part of the agreement, President Díaz would finish his term and the United States forces would remain in Nicaragua to maintain order and supervise the 1928 elections. The United States would also work with the Nicaraguan government to organize a non-partisan police force. Both the rebels and the government also agreed to disarm their forces while the United States organized this police force—which would be known as the Nicaraguan National Guard—as well.

== Aftermath ==
While most of the government and rebel forces agreed to accept the pact, Sacasa refused to sign the agreement and left the country. A rebel liberal group under the leadership of Augusto César Sandino also refused to sign the Pact of Espino Negro. Sandino founded the Ejército Defensor de la Soberanía Nacional and combated the U.S. occupation.

In January 1933, the United States, now in the midst of the Great Depression and anxious to end involvement in Nicaragua's military affairs after seeing the casualties inflicted by the Sandinistas, agreed to withdraw from Nicaragua. The following year the Nicaraguan National Guard captured and executed Sandino and destroyed his entire army. The leader of the Nicaraguan National Guard, Anastasio Somoza, also used this police force to win the 1936 Nicaraguan presidential election and establish a dictatorship.
