= 1928 Nicaraguan general election =

- 4 November 1928
Nominee	José María Moncada	Martín Benárd
Party	Nationalist Liberal Party	Conservative Party
Popular vote	76,676	56,987
Percentage	57.37	42.63
President before election
Adolfo Díaz
Conservative Party
Elected President
José María Moncada
Nationalist Liberal Party

General elections were held in Nicaragua on 4 November 1928 to elect a president, half of the deputies and a third of the senators of the National Congress.

"The electoral mission had given three months' training, in special schools in each province, to the marine and navy enlisted men who were to be chairmen of most of the 432 local electoral boards. The chairmen of the 13 departmental electoral boards were for the most part officers from the United States Army."

Two minor parties, Conservative Republican and Liberal Republican, requested the National Board of Elections (NBE) the right to appear on the ballot. The NBE unanimously refused both requests.

The large turnout of 88% of those registered resulted in an unequivocal victory for the Liberal Party. More importantly, the defeated Conservatives professed its willingness to abide by this outcome. "Since the Liberal Party had discarded its extreme nationalism and anti-imperialism which it had acquired under José Santos Zelaya, the United States was able to install a Liberal president in 1928 without sacrificing even the least security for its interests in the country."

"Although the National Guard got off to a promising start, the continued rivalry between Nicaragua's traditional political parties ultimately led to its politicization. In the elections of 1928, the Guard seemed to supervise polling effectively, and at the time there were reasons to believe that it could develop into a cohesive and professional policing force. Following his decisive electoral victory, however, José María Moncada Tapia of the Liberal Party worked to convert the institution into a political force of the Liberals."

== Results ==
Party	Candidate	Votes	%	Seats			
Party	Candidate	Votes	%	Chamber won	Chamber total	Senate won	Senate total
Nationalist Liberal Party	José María Moncada	76,676	57.37	17	19	5	12
Conservative Party	Martín Benárd	56,987	42.63	8	24	4	12
Total		133,663	100.00	25	43	9	24
Registered voters/turnout		148,831	–				
Source: Nohlen, Political Handbook of the World

== Bibliography ==
- Bacevich, Andrew J., Jr. “The American electoral mission in Nicaragua, 1927-28.” Diplomatic history 4, 3:241-261 (summer 1980).
- Barquero, Sara L. Gobernantes de Nicaragua, 1825-1947. Managua: Publicaciones del Ministerio de Instrucción Pública. Second edition. 1945.
- Cardenal Tellería, Marco A. Nicaragua y su historia: cronología del acontecer histórico y construcción de la nación nicaragüense. Managua: Banco Mercantíl. Volume I. 2000.
- Dodd, Thomas J. Managing democracy in Central America (A case study: United States election supervision in Nicaragua, 1927–1933). New Brunswick: Transaction Publishers. 1992.
- Elections in the Americas A Data Handbook Volume 1. North America, Central America, and the Caribbean. Edited by Dieter Nohlen. 2005.
- Gorman, Stephen M. “Social change and political revolution: the case of Nicaragua.” Central America : crisis and adaptation. 1984. Albuquerque: University of New Mexico Press.
- Kagan, Robert. A twilight struggle: American power and Nicaragua, 1977-1990. New York: Free Press. 1996.
- Kamman, William. A search for stability: United States diplomacy toward Nicaragua 1925-1933. Notre Dame: University of Notre Dame Press. 1968.
- MacRenato, Ternot. Somoza: seizure of power, 1926-1939. La Jolla: University of California, San Diego. 1991.
- Mahoney, James. The legacies of liberalism: path dependence and political regimes in Central America. Baltimore: The Johns Hopkins University Press. 2001.
- Millett, Richard. Guardians of the dynasty: a history of the U.S. created Guardia Nacional de Nicaragua and the Somoza Family. Maryknoll: Orbis Books. 1977.
- Munro, Dana G. The United States and the Caribbean republics, 1921-1933. Princeton: Princeton University Press. 1974.
- Musicant, Ivan. The banana wars: a history of United States military intervention in Latin America from the Spanish–American War to the invasion of Panama. New York: Macmillan Publishing Company. 1990.
- Political handbook of the world 1929. New York, 1930.
- Smith, Hazel. Nicaragua: self-determination and survival. London : Pluto Press. 1993.
- Vargas, Oscar-René. Elecciones presidenciales en Nicaragua, 1912-1932: análisis socio-político. Managua: Fundación Manolo Morales. 1989.
