= Vicente Cuadra Chamberlain =

- Born: 1919
- Died: 2000 (aged 80–81)
- Education: Colegio Centro América
- Employer: Publicidad Cuadra Chamberlain
- Father: Vicente Cuadra Gómez
- Relatives: José Vicente Cuadra (grandfather); Raul Cuadra Chamberlain (brother)

Vicente Cuadra Chamberlain (1919–2000) was one of the pioneers of the Nicaraguan advertising industry.

He was the eldest son of the economist, Vicente Cuadra Gomez and a grandson of President Vicente Cuadra Lugo. After his graduation from Colegio Centro América in 1939, Vicente came to San Francisco, California, to study business. He worked as an office manager during the 1940s and early 1950s.

In 1956, he returned to Managua, Nicaragua, to work as the general manager of the advertising agency, Publicidad Cuadra Chamberlain. His brother, Raul founded the agency in 1950. During the next forty years, under Vicente's innovative and creative leadership, the agency prospered to become the undisputed leader in the advertising/communications industry in the country and one of the best in Latin America.

== Sources ==
1. Revista Conservadora del Pensamiento Centroamericano Vol XVII, Genealogia de la Familia Quadra, Agosto 1967
2. Cuadra - Chamberlain Family Interviews. PCCH Journal Vol 1, Fall 1971
3. Los Pioneros de la publicidad en Nicaragua, El Nuevo Dario Febrero 2001
4. Historia de la Publicidad en Nicaragua - El Informativo Nica Junio 2007
5. Vicente Cuadra : Maestro y percusor de la publicidad en Nicaragua -Bolsa de Noticias Noviembre 2000
