= Fernando Chamorro =

Fernando Chamorro may refer to:

- Fernando Chamorro Alfaro, 19th century Nicaraguan general
- Fernando "El Negro" Chamorro, Nicaraguan rebel fighting both the Somoza and Sandinista regimes
