= Fernando Solórzano =

Nicaraguan general (1863–1925)

Fernando Solórzano Gutiérrez

Vice President of Nicaragua
- In office 1 January 1913 – 1 January 1917
- President: Adolfo Díaz
- Preceded by: Adolfo Díaz
- Succeeded by: Nemesio Martínez

Personal details
- Born: 23 October 1863 Managua
- Died: 11 January 1925 (aged 61)
- Party: Conservative Party
- Relatives: Carlos José Solórzano (brother)

Fernando Solórzano Gutiérrez was Nicaraguan general and politician and once Vice President of Nicaragua.

Solórzano was born on 23 October 1863, in Managua. He was son of Managua's Conservative Party leader, Federico Solórzano. He was natural brother of Carlos José Solórzano. He worked as a coffee farmer.

Solórzano was a Major General in Nicaraguan army. He was elected as Vice President of Nicaragua in the government of Adolfo Díaz for a four-year term from 1913 to January 1917.

Solórzano died on 11 January 1925. His grand-children served as officials in the government of Arnoldo Alemán Lacayo.
