= Chamorro =

Chamorro may refer to:

- Chamorro people, the indigenous people of the Mariana Islands in the Western Pacific
- Chamorro language, an Austronesian language indigenous to The Marianas
- Chamorro Time Zone, the time zone of Guam and the Northern Mariana Islands
- Chamorro, Las Marías, Puerto Rico, a barrio in Puerto Rico, United States
- Chamorro Party, a 19th-century Portuguese political party; see Portuguese Prime Ministers
- Chamorro (surname)

- Chamorro (family), Nicaraguan political family
