= Pedro Joaquín =

Pedro Joaquín may refer to:

- Pedro Joaquín Chamorro Alfaro, President of Nicaragua, 1875–1879
- Pedro Joaquín Chamorro Cardenal, martyred Somoza opponent and grandson of the president.
- Pedro Joaquín Coldwell, Mexican politician and former Governor of Quintana Roo
