= Nicaraguan Civil War =

Nicaraguan Civil War may refer to:

- Nicaraguan civil war (1912)
- Nicaraguan Civil War (1926–1927)
- Nicaraguan Revolution (1962–1990)
