= Uriza =

Uriza is a surname. Notable people with the surname include:

- Rubén Uriza (1920–1992), Mexican show jumping champion
- Sebastián Uriza (1861–1927), Nicaraguan politician
