= Fernando Chamorro Alfaro =

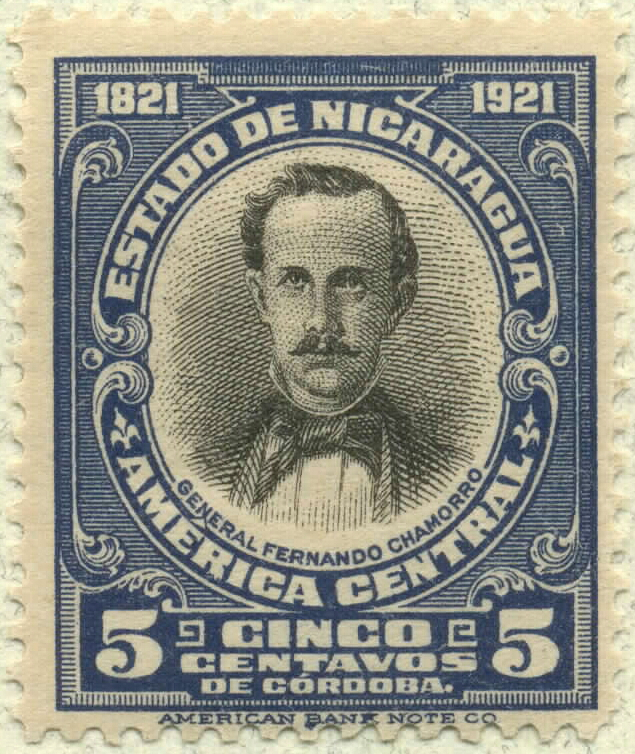
General Fernando Chamorro Nicaraguan Postage, 1921

Fernando Chamorro Alfaro (1824 – 21 July 1863) was a Nicaraguan politician and military officer. He served as a General and member of the governing junta of Nicaragua (1860–1863).

Fernando Chamorro was a firm supporter of the Conservative Party, which was dominated during his youth by his half-brother and guardian, Fruto Chamorro. When Fruto died in 1855, the Liberal Party attempted to take power and invited filibuster William Walker to support their cause. Civil war ensued. Fernando organized an army. As commanding general, he pledged his loyalty to the legitimate president José María Estrada, then in exile in Honduras. However, his forces were defeated in a battle with Walker's troops and they took refuge in Honduras.

Shortly thereafter, President Estrada returned from Honduras to Somotillo, Nicaragua where he installed his government. He immediately appointed Pedro Joaquín Chamorro Alfaro as General Minister and General Tomás Martínez Guerrero as Commander of the Army. General Fernando and his men returned from Honduras to join the government of Estrada. Subsequently, the two factions united in opposition to the Walker incursion, and General Fernando was able to concentrate on fighting Americans and not Nicaraguans. His disposition of forces resulted in a victory over the Americans at San Jacinto Hacienda.

In 1857, Walker was expelled. and two presidents, representing the Liberals and Conservatives, took office. General Martínez became the Conservative president and General Fernando Chamorro remained his loyal supporter.

When designated acting president during an absence of Martínez in 1860, he learned that William Walker had returned and was threatening Honduras. He published a proclamation which in part said: An enemy, the filibuster, comes to provide us the opportunity to prove to the entire world that we know how to defend our rights; the danger is also ours. The question is Central American. Walker was finally captured and killed in Honduras in 1860.

In 1863, Máximo Jerez attempted to overthrow President Martínez, and General Fernando Chamorro again fielded an army to defend him. But, he was assassinated on 21 July 1863 near Choluteca, Honduras.

== Genealogy ==
Fernando Chamorro Alfaro comes from a very influential family in Nicaragua, both politically as well as economically.

His ancestors were:

- Diego Chamorro de Sotomayor y Murga b. 1711 Sevilla, Spain, d. 1785 Nicaragua and Gregoria Gertrudis Lacayo de Briones y Pomar b. 1716 Granada, Nicaragua d. 1784 Granada, Nicaragua
- Fernando Chamorro Lacayo b. 1751 Granada, Nicaragua d. 1793 Granada, Nicaragua and Barbara Nicolasa Arguello del Castillo b. 1756 Granada, Nicaragua d. 1785 Granada, Nicaragua
- Pedro José Chamorro Argüello b. 29 December 1782 Granada, Nicaragua, d. 31 May 1824 Granada, army general, and Josefa Margarita Alfaro Jimenez-Monterroso b. 1794 Granada, Nicaragua, d. 1884 Granada, Nicaragua
  - Pedro Jose´s children included President Pedro Joaquín Chamorro Alfaro, President Fernando Chamorro Alfaro and President Frutos Chamorro Pérez

He is uncle of President Rosendo Chamorro Oreamuno, half brother of President Frutos Chamorro Perez, brother of President Pedro Joaquín Chamorro Alfaro, uncle of President Diego Manuel Chamorro Bolaños and grand uncle of President Emiliano Chamorro Vargas

He was married to Mercedes Quesada and had three children, Fernando, Alberto and Saba

He was also married to Ana Arguello Imeri and had three children, Francisco, Ana and Alejandro.
