= Raul Cuadra Chamberlain =

Nicaraguan musician

- Born: 1924
- Died: 1974 (aged 49–50)
- Employer: Publicidad Cuadra Chamberlain
- Father: Vicente Cuadra Gómez
- Relatives: José Vicente Cuadra (grandfather); Vicente Cuadra Chamberlain (brother)

Raul Cuadra Chamberlain (1924–1974) was a Nicaraguan musician and advertising pioneer. He was a son of the economist Vicente Cuadra Gómez and grandson of José Vicente Cuadra.

In the 1940s, he traveled through Nicaragua and the rest of Central America with his orchestra, El Champu de Carino. Audiences were delighted with his singing and the music of his orchestra. To contribute to the expense of traveling, he started to advertise various products and services of different businesses during the intermissions of Champu de Carino shows.

In 1950, he founded one of the first advertising agencies in the country - Publicidad Cuadra Chamberlain, just as Nicaragua was experiencing a post World War II economic boom. In 1956, his elder brother Vicente joined the agency as general manager. In 1961, due to health problems, Raul stepped down to concentrate on his music. He continued to work as a consultant on special projects for the agency until his death in 1974.

== Sources ==
1. Revista Conservadora del Pensamiento Centroamericano Vol XVII, Genealogia de la Familia Quadra, Agosto 1967

2. Cuadra - Chamberlain Family Interviews. PCCH Journal Vol 1, Fall 1971
