= Enoc Aguado =

Nicaraguan politician and attorney

Enoc Aguado Farfán
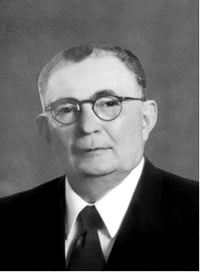

Vice President of Nicaragua
- In office 1 January 1929 – 1 January 1933
- President: José María Moncada
- Preceded by: Juan Bautista Sacasa
- Succeeded by: Rodolfo Espinosa Ramírez

Personal details
- Born: 28 February 1883; León
- Died: 1964; Managua
- Political party: Liberal Party

Enoc Aguado Farfán (1883 – 1964) was a Nicaraguan politician and attorney. He was the Vice President of Nicaragua of President José María Moncada from January 1929 to January 1933.

Aguado was president of the Chamber of Deputies 1924–1925 and 1942–1943. In 1944 he founded with other dissidents the Independent Liberal Party. He was the presidential candidate of Chamorro-led conservatives against Somoza's candidate in the 1947 Nicaraguan general election.

Political offices
Preceded by Juan Bautista Sacasa	Vice President of Nicaragua; 1929–1933	Succeeded by Rodolfo Espinosa Ramírez
