= Rodolfo Espinosa Ramírez =

Nicaraguan politician (1876–1944)

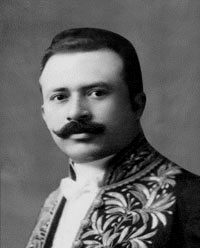

Vice President of Nicaragua
- In office 1 January 1933 – 9 June 1936
- President: Juan Bautista Sacasa
- Preceded by: Enoc Aguado
- Succeeded by: Francisco Navarro

Personal details
- Born: 11 November 1876; Managua
- Died: 1 December 1944
- Political party: Liberal Party

Rodolfo Espinosa Ramírez (1876–1944) was a Nicaraguan politician and former Vice President.

He was the Vice President of Juan Bautista Sacasa from January 1933 to June 1936, when Sacasa was toppled by Somoza. Espinosa ran as the vice presidential candidate of Leonardo Argüello Barreto in the December 1936 elections.

Espinosa was a doctor and surgeon from the Universidad de San Carlos de Guatemala. He was elected Mayor of Managua in 1904, and the following year member of the National Congress of Nicaragua for his party: the Liberals. He was Minister of Foreign Relations in 1908. In the administration of Juan Bautista Sacasa worked against Somoza.

Espinosa held freemasonry with a high degree. He was the grand master of Nicaraguan freemason lodge from 1902 to 1907.

Political offices
Preceded by Enoc Aguado	Vice President of Nicaragua; 1933–1936	Succeeded by Francisco Navarro Alvarado
