= Adán Cárdenas =

Nicaraguan politician and medical doctor

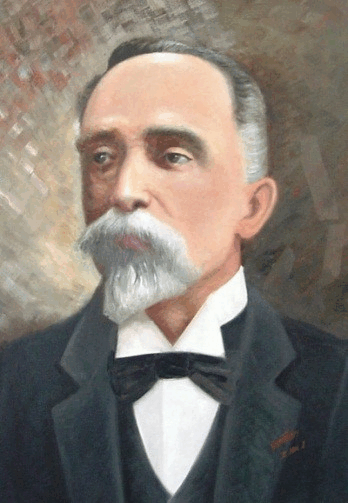

President of Nicaragua
- In office 1 March 1883 – 1 March 1887
- Preceded by: Joaquín Zavala
- Succeeded by: Evaristo Carazo

Personal details
- Born: Adán Cárdenas del Castillo; 7 June 1836 Granada, Federal Republic of Central America
- Died: 1 January 1916 (aged 79) Rivas, Nicaragua
- Party: Conservative
- Spouse: Gertrudis Martínez Solórzano
- Relatives: René Cárdenas (Grandson)
- Education: University of Pisa

Adán Cárdenas del Castillo (7 June 1836 – 1 January 1916) was a Nicaraguan politician and medical doctor. He also served as the President of Nicaragua between 1 March 1883 and 1 March 1887. He was a member of the Conservative Party of Nicaragua.

Cárdenas was born in the colonial city of Granada on the shores of Lake Cocibolca in Nicaragua. He and his parent moved to Italy for some time in 1852, where he attended the National School of Genoa and received a doctorate in medicine at the University of Pisa in Tuscany. He returned to Nicaragua in 1862. He was president of the Nicaraguan Congress 1879-1881, 1885-1886 and 1911-1912.

== Family ==
He was married to Gertrudis Martínez Solórzano, daughter of Tomás Martínez Guerrero, 36th President of Nicaragua, and wife Gertrudis Solórzano Zavala. His grandson, René Cárdenas, became the first Spanish-language announcer to cover Major League Baseball.

Political offices
Preceded by Joaquín Zavala	President of Nicaragua; 1883–1887	Succeeded by Evaristo Carazo
