= William Blaney Richardson =

American naturalist active in South America

William Blaney Richardson (19 March 1868, in Boston, Massachusetts – 1 December 1927, in Matagalpa, Nicaragua) was an American-Nicaraguan naturalist and professional collector of zoological specimens.

As a young man, Richardson was employed by Charles B. Cory to collect bird specimens in the West Indies. While collecting specimens in Mexico, Richardson married the Mexican citizen Rosaura Ojeda.

When he and his wife moved to Nicaragua, he changed his middle name from "Blaney" to "Blaine".

... he was part of the expedition to Nicaragua in 1908 and another to Ecuador in 1912. In fact, he collected in Nicaragua many times; in 1891 he settled in Matagalpa, Nicaragua, to grow coffee, and stayed on for the rest of his life. He took part in the Roosevelt-Rondon scientific expedition to Brazil of 1913–1914, and on another expedition to Ecuador in 1916 he collected for the American Museum of Natural History and the Academy of Sciences of Natural Sciences of Philadelphia.

In southwestern Colombia from November 1910 to July 1911 and from August 1912 to October 1912, Richardson collected many mammalian specimens.

One of his daughters married Francisco Navarro, Vice President of Nicaragua from 1937 to 1939, and one of his grandsons, Bill Richardson, was Governor of New Mexico from 2003 to 2011.
