= Francisco Navarro =

Vice President of Nicaragua

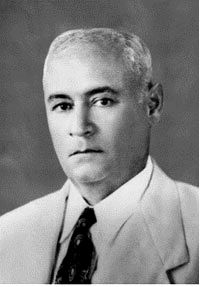

Francisco Navarro Alvarado was Vice President of Nicaragua from January 1937 to March 1939, under presidency of Anastasio Somoza García. He was elected in 1936 Nicaraguan general election and lost the position when the vice-presidency was abolished in 1939.

Navarro married Lucia Richardson, daughter of William Blaney Richardson and Rosaura Ojeda, and the aunt of New Mexico governor Bill Richardson.

His son Ernesto "Tito" Navarro Richardson was Labor Minister under Anastasio Somoza Debayle. His grandson Alejandro Fiallos Navarro was executive president of Empresa Portuaria Nacional, the Nicaraguan port authority. Alejandro's brother Francisco was Nicaraguan Ambassador to the United States in the early 1980s.

Political offices
Preceded by Rodolfo Espinosa	Vice President of Nicaragua; 1937-1939	Succeeded by Mariano Argüello Vargas
