= Quadra =

Quadra may refer to:

- Quadra, São Paulo, a municipality in Brazil
- Quadra Island, British Columbia, Canada
- Vancouver Quadra, a federal electoral district in British Columbia, Canada
- HMCS Quadra, a Royal Canadian Navy cadet training center in Comox, British Columbia
- Macintosh Quadra, a line of computers made by Apple Computer
- ARP Quadra, a paraphonic analog synthesizer produced by ARP Instruments
- Quadra, Telecine introduced by Broadcast Television Systems Inc. in 1993
- Quadra, a group of four psychological types in the theory of socionics
- Quadra (album), by Brazilian heavy metal band Sepultura
- Quadra Blu, a character from Max Rep comics by illustrator Lyman Dally
- The fighting style of several characters in the anime manga and light novel Aria the Scarlet Ammo
- Quadra, a genus of flies described in 1929

== See also ==
- Álvaro de la Quadra (d.1564), Spanish Ambassador to England during the reign of Queen Elizabeth of England
- Juan Francisco de la Bodega y Quadra (1743–1794), Spanish explorer
- Quadra's and Vancouver's Island, the original name of Vancouver Island
- Hostius Quadra, an ancient Roman man described in Seneca's Natural Questions
- Cuadra, a surname
