= Juan Bautista Sacasa =

President of Nicaragua (1933-1936)

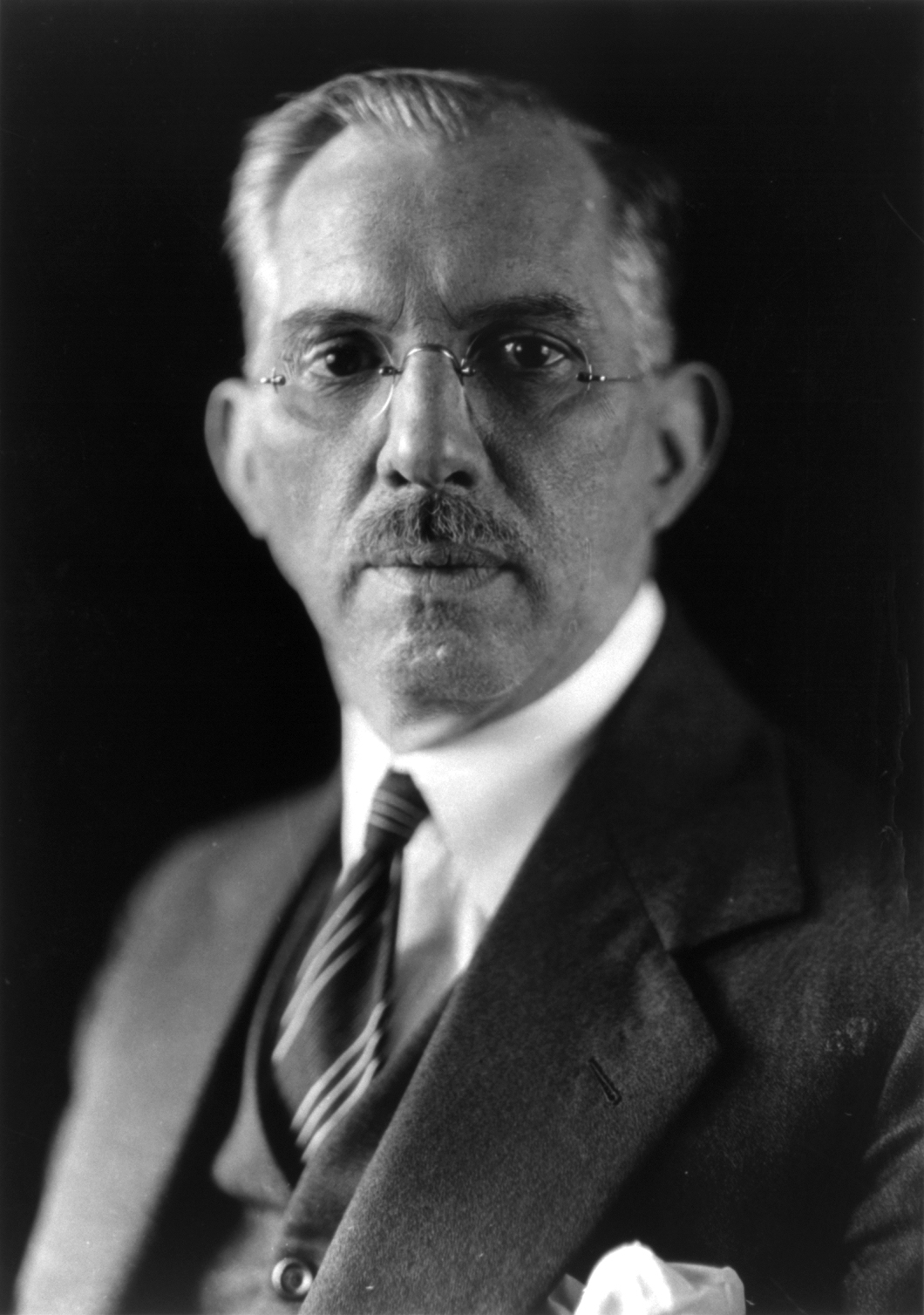
- Sacasa, c. 1925–1936

24th President of Nicaragua
- In office 1 January 1933 – 9 June 1936
- Vice President: Rodolfo Espinosa Ramírez
- Preceded by: José María Moncada
- Succeeded by: Carlos Alberto Brenes

Vice President of Nicaragua
- In office 1 January 1925 – 14 March 1926
- President: Carlos José Solórzano
- Preceded by: Bartolomé Martínez
- Succeeded by: Enoc Aguado

Personal details
- Born: 21 December 1874 León, Nicaragua
- Died: 17 April 1946 (aged 71) Los Angeles
- Party: Liberal
- Spouse: María Sacasa Argüello Manning (1886–1981)
- Relations: Benjamín Lacayo
- Education: Columbia University
- Profession: Medical doctor

Juan Bautista Sacasa (21 December 1874 in León, Nicaragua – 17 April 1946 in Los Angeles, California) was the President of Nicaragua from 1 January 1933 to 9 June 1936. He was the eldest son of Roberto Sacasa and Ángela Sacasa Cuadra, the former's cousin twice removed. He was a relative of Benjamín Lacayo Sacasa.

Born in the town of León, Sacasa studied in the United States from 1889 to 1901, earning an M.D. from Columbia University. He served as a professor and dean of faculty at the National University in León, and was a supporter of the Liberal regime of José Santos Zelaya. In 1924, Sacasa became a member of a political coalition headed by moderate Conservative Carlos Solórzano. Shortly afterwards, the detachment of U.S. Marines which had remained in Nicaragua for thirteen years withdrew, believing that the political situation was stable. In October 1925, Solórzano's government was overthrown by former President General Emiliano Chamorro, who failed to gain U.S. recognition and subsequently resigned in favor of Adolfo Díaz. In the meantime, Sacasa fled to Mexico.

Following an uprising by Liberal soldiers in Puerto Cabezas, Sacasa returned to Nicaragua in 1926. Asserting his claim as constitutional president, he established a government in Puerto Cabezas. Supplied by Mexico with arms and munitions, the Liberal rebels, under the command of General José María Moncada, nearly succeeded in capturing Managua. However, the U.S. forced the two warring parties to enter into negotiations, resulting in the Pact of Espino Negro, which required that both sides would disarm and Díaz would be allowed to finish his term. Sacasa reluctantly agreed to accept the agreement and withdraw his claim to the presidency, but refused to sign the pact and left the country; leaving Moncada to sign the pact on Sacasa's behalf. Over the next six years, a formerly obscure Liberal general named Augusto Sandino would lead a guerrilla war against the Marines, who had remained in the country to enforce the agreement.

In 1932, Sacasa was elected president. He took office on January 1, 1933, the day before the scheduled departure of the Marines. At the insistence of the U.S. Ambassador, he named Anastasio Somoza García, who was married to one of his nieces, as director of the Guardia Nacional (National Guard). The following month, Sacasa met with Sandino, during which Sandino pledged his loyalty to the new government in exchange for amnesty and land for his followers. Sandino continued to call for the disbanding of the National Guard and, in February 1934, he was assassinated under orders from Somoza. Despite Sacasa's disapproval, he proved unable to contain the growing power of Somoza and the National Guard. His popularity continued to diminish as Nicaragua's fragile economy suffered the collapse of coffee prices due to the Great Depression and allegations of widespread fraud surfaced in the 1934 congressional elections. Meanwhile, Somoza's power continued to grow, and he cultivated ties with former presidents Moncada and Chamorro. Early in 1936, Somoza used the National Guard to purge local officials loyal to the president and replace them with his associates. On June 9, he forced Sacasa to resign, appointing a puppet president before assuming the presidency himself the following year. Afterwards, Sacasa fled into exile in the U.S., living in Los Angeles until his death ten years later.

He married María Argüello Manning, a cousin of Leonardo Argüello, the 47th President of Nicaragua; together, they had the following children:

- Maruca Sacasa Argüello
- Carlos Sacasa Arguello
- Roberto Sacasa Arguello
- Gloria Sacasa Arguello

Juan Bautista Sacaza was the first cousin of Bertha Lacayo Sacaza. Bertha Lacayo Sacasa was married to Lisimaco Lacayo Solorzano and they had only two children Chester Lacayo Lacayo and Will Lacayo Lacayo. Will Lacayo Lacayo had four children Danilo Lacayo, Bertha Lacayo, Ligia Lacayo and Tania Lacayo.

Political offices
Preceded by Bartolomé Martínez	Vice President of Nicaragua; 1925–1926	Succeeded by Enoc Aguado
Preceded by José María Moncada	President of Nicaragua; 1933–1936	Succeeded by Carlos Alberto Brenes
