= Evaristo Carazo =

Former President of Nicaragua

Evaristo Carazo Aranda
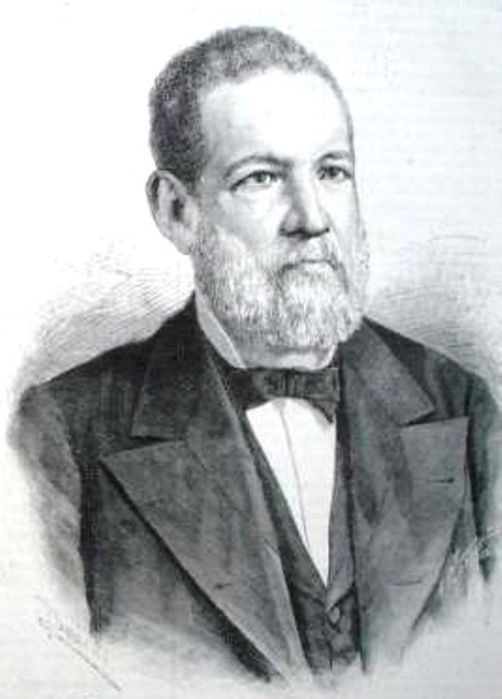

President of Nicaragua
- In office 1 March 1887 – 1 August 1889
- Vice President: Roberto Sacasa
- Preceded by: Adán Cárdenas
- Succeeded by: Nicolás Osorno (Acting)

Personal details
- Born: Evaristo Carazo Aranda; 24 October 1821 Rivas, First Mexican Empire
- Died: 1 August 1889 (aged 67) Granada, Nicaragua
- Party: Conservative
- Spouse: Engracia Hurtado
- Children: 5
- Parent(s): Lorenzo Carazo Alvarado, María del Rosario Aranda Muñoz.
- Occupation: Politician, Military Scientist

Evaristo Carazo Aranda (24 October 1821 in Rivas, Nicaragua – 1 August 1889 in Granada, Nicaragua) was the President of Nicaragua from 1 March 1887 until his death on 1 August 1889. He was a member of the Conservative Party of Nicaragua. He reached the ranks of Coronel in 1856 in the war against William Walker.

He was a son of Lorenzo Carazo Alvarado and María del Rosario Aranda Muñoz. Paternal grandson of Francisco Carazo Soto and wife and cousin Jacoba Alvarado Baeza, great-grandson of Pedro Alvarado Guevara and wife Manuela Baeza Baroto and great-great-grandson of Pedro Alvarado Vidamartel and wife Ángela Guevara Sáenz, daughter of Alvaro Guevara Sandoval and wife María Sáenz Vázquez and paternal granddaughter of José Guevara Maldonado and wife Inés Sandoval Pereira, daughter of José Sandoval Ocampo and wife Isabel Pereira Peláez and maternal granddaughter of Portuguese Sebastián (Sebastião) Pereira Cardoso and wife Antonia Peláez Vázquez de Coronado, daughter of Diego Peláez de Lermos and wife Andrea Vázquez de Coronado Rodríguez, daughter of Gonzalo Vázquez de Coronado Arias and wife Ana Rodríguez del Padrón, and paternal granddaughter of Juan Vázquez de Coronado y Anaya and wife Isabel Arias-Dávila.

He was married to Engracia Hurtado Bustos, whom he had five children with. The children's names were Evaristo, Manuel Antonio, Ernesto, Dolores and Maria Benita.

He died in office in Granada, Nicaragua.

Political offices
Preceded by Adán Cárdenas	President of Nicaragua; 1887–1889	Succeeded by Nicolás Osorno
