= René Cárdenas =

Nicaraguan sports journalist and announcer (1930–2026)

- Born: February 6, 1930; Managua, Nicaragua
- Died: May 10, 2026 (aged 96); Houston, Texas, U.S.
- Sports commentary career
- Team(s): Los Angeles Dodgers, Houston Astros, Texas Rangers
- Genre: Play-by-play
- Sport(s): Major League Baseball, Boxing

René Cárdenas (Spanish pronunciation: [reˈne ˈkaɾðenas]; February 6, 1930 – May 10, 2026) was a Nicaraguan sports journalist and announcer. He became the first Spanish-language announcer to cover Major League Baseball (MLB) when he joined the Los Angeles Dodgers in 1958. He also broadcast games for the Houston Astros and Texas Rangers and announced boxing matches, as well.

While working for the Astros, Cárdenas developed the first international radio network, which broadcast games to Central and South America. He was the first Spanish-language radio announcer for each of the three MLB baseball teams that he covered.

== Early life ==
Cárdenas was born in Managua, Nicaragua, on February 6, 1930. He was the grandson of Adán Cárdenas, who introduced baseball to Nicaragua in the late 19th century and served as the president of Nicaragua. His uncle, Adolfo, played on the Nicaraguan national baseball team.

== Career ==
At age 16, Cárdenas began writing about baseball for La Prensa and La Estrella de Nicaragua, Nicaraguan newspapers. He also called games on Radio Mundial.

In 1958, the Los Angeles Dodgers hired Cárdenas to announce their games on the radio in Spanish, making him the first Spanish-language baseball announcer in Major League Baseball. He trained Jaime Jarrín, who had little prior experience with baseball. Cárdenas also called a championship boxing match held between Sugar Ray Robinson and Gene Fullmer.

In 1961, Cárdenas was hired by the expansion Houston Colt .45s (now the Houston Astros). He created the first international radio network for baseball in 1966 in order to help the Astros recruit talent in South and Central America. He also called other sporting events that were held at the Astrodome, including the 1968 boxing title match won by Jimmy Ellis to claim the title vacated by Muhammad Ali. Cárdenas's signature was stamped onto the last beam used in the Astrodome's construction.

The Astros canceled their Spanish-language broadcasts in 1975, firing Cárdenas. He returned to Nicaragua, where he called games on television and radio, but he returned to the United States in 1981 to call games for the Texas Rangers. From 1982 through 1998, he called games for the Dodgers. After that, he entered semi-retirement, as he continued to write for La Prensa and the Spanish-language website of the Astros.

Cárdenas returned to radio to broadcast Astros games in 2007. The following year, Cárdenas made his American television debut with the Astros, broadcasting 15 games.

== Personal life and death ==
Cárdenas's first marriage ended in divorce. He married his second wife, Jilma, in 1957. Cárdenas had a daughter from his first marriage and a son from his second.

He became a United States citizen in 1963. In 1979, he and his wife fled Nicaragua and lost their home and valuables to the Sandinista National Liberation Front. Cárdenas's half-brother, Chester Escobar, had worked with the Somoza family and was executed by the Sandinista government. Cárdenas made his home in Houston and refused to return to Nicaragua until his belongings were returned to him.

Cárdenas was a survivor of colon cancer. He died in Houston on May 10, 2026, at the age of 96.

== Honors ==
In 2002, Cárdenas was inducted into the Hispanic Heritage Baseball Museum Hall of Fame. He was included in the balloting for the Ford C. Frick Award in 2011, 2012, and 2025, but did not win the award.

In 2024, Cárdenas was inducted into the Astros Hall of Fame.
