= Fernando Guzmán Solórzano =

Nicaraguan politician

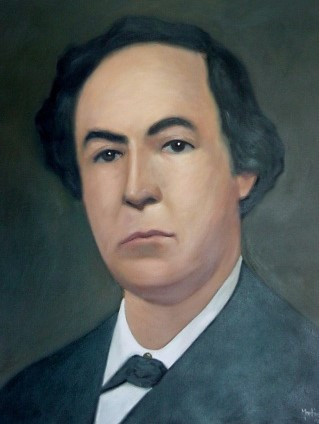

President of Nicaragua
- In office 1 March 1867 – 1 March 1871
- Preceded by: Tomás Martínez
- Succeeded by: José Vicente Cuadra

Personal details
- Born: Fernando Guzmán Solórzano; 30 May 1812 Tipitapa, Captaincy General of Guatemala, New Spain
- Died: 19 October 1891 (aged 79) Granada, Nicaragua
- Party: Conservative
- Occupation: Politician, Military Scientist

Fernando Guzmán Solórzano (30 May 1812 in Tipitapa – 19 October 1891 in Granada) was the President of Nicaragua from March 1, 1867 to March 1, 1871. He was a member of the Conservative Party.

He was a relative of Carlos José Solórzano, President of Nicaragua in the 1920s.

Political offices
Preceded by Tomás Martínez	President of Nicaragua; 1867–1871	Succeeded by Vicente Cuadra
