= Ernesto Navarro Richardson =

Ernesto "Tito" Navarro Richardson was a Nicaraguan politician. He was the son of Francisco Navarro. He served as Minister of Labour in the government of Anastasio Somoza Debayle.
