= Joaquín Zavala =

President of Nicaragua (1835–1906)

Joaquín Zavala Solís
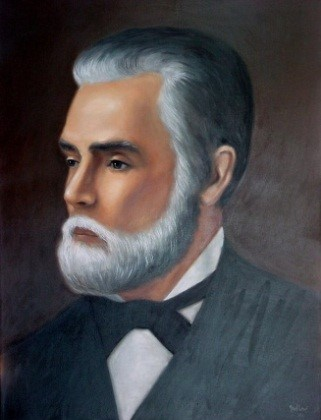

President of Nicaragua
- In office 16 July 1893 – 25 July 1893 (Acting)
- Preceded by: Salvador Machado (Acting)
- Succeeded by: José Santos Zelaya
- In office 1 March 1879 – 1 March 1883
- Preceded by: Pedro Joaquín Chamorro Alfaro
- Succeeded by: Adán Cárdenas

Personal details
- Born: Joaquín Zavala Solís; 30 October 1835 Managua, Federal Republic of Central America
- Died: 30 December 1906 (aged 71) Managua, Nicaragua
- Party: Conservative
- Occupation: Politician

Joaquín Zavala Solís (30 November 1835 in Managua – 30 December 1906 in Managua) was the President of Nicaragua from 1 March 1879 to 1 March 1883 and from 16 July to 15 September 1893. He was a member of the Conservative Party of Nicaragua.

He is now remembered especially for having thwarted the request of the young Rubén Darío, later to become one of the most well-known Spanish-language poets, for a government scholarship to study in Europe. In 1882 Darío, then 15 years old, read some of his poetry to a group including the President - whereupon Zavala reportedly reproved him: "My son, if you so write against the religion of your fathers and their homeland now, what will become of you if you go to Europe and learn worse things?"

Political offices
Preceded by Pedro Joaquín Chamorro	President of Nicaragua; 1879–1883	Succeeded by Adán Cárdenas
Preceded by Salvador Machado	President of Nicaragua; 1893	Succeeded by José Santos Zelaya
