= Vice President of Nicaragua =

Second-highest political office in Nicaragua

Vice President of the Republic of Nicaragua
- Vicepresidente de la República de Nicaragua
- Coat of arms of Nicaragua
- Incumbent; Vacant since 18 February 2025
- Term length: Five years renewable
- Constituting instrument: Constitution of Nicaragua
- Formation: 15 September 1893
- First holder: Gen. Anastasio J. Ortiz Argeñal
- Salary: US$3,100 per month

The vice president of the Republic of Nicaragua (Spanish: Vicepresidente de la República de Nicaragua) is the second highest political position in Nicaragua. According to the current Constitution enacted in 2025, the co-presidents can appoint multiple vice presidents.

The salary of the vice president has been US$3,100 per month.

== Deputy Chief of State 1826–1838 ==
As in other countries of the Central American Federation, also Nicaragua had Head of State and Deputy Head of State. Deputy Head of State was first mentioned in the Constitution of 1826. The position had a great influence in important decision-making process of the Head of State. The position of Deputy Chief of State was removed in the Constitution of 1838. In case of vacancy in the presidency, a member of Senate would be elected to fill the vacancy.

== Vice President of Nicaragua ==
The position of Vice President of the Republic has existed legally on four occasions:

1. During Liberal Constitution between 1893 and 1896. President Zelaya abolished the position in 1896, replacing it with a system of three Presidential Designates elected annually by the National Congress of Nicaragua.
2. During Conservative Constitution from 1911 to 1939.
3. From 1962 to 1972 by constitutional reforms of Luis Somoza Debayle in 1962 and René Schick in 1966.
4. After the new Constitution of 1987.

Gen. Anastasio Ortiz, was the first vice president appointed by a Constituent Assembly. The Constitutional system of replacement of the president by the vice president worked in 1923 when President Diego Manuel Chamorro was replaced by Bartolomé Martínez.

During the Constitution of 1987, which was in force until 2025, the vice presidents were elected on the same ticket, and at the same time, as the president.

A list of the office holders follows.

Name	Inaugurated	Left office	President	Notes
Roberto Sacasa Sarria	April 1887	1 August 1889	Evaristo Carazo	Presidential designate
Gen. Anastasio J. Ortiz Argeñal	15 September 1893	9 January 1894	José Santos Zelaya	
Francisco Baca	1894	February 1896	José Santos Zelaya	
Adolfo Díaz	August 1910	May 1911	Juan José Estrada	
Fernando Solórzano	1 January 1913	1 January 1917	Adolfo Díaz	
Nemesio Martínez	January 1917	December 1920	Emiliano Chamorro Vargas	
Bartolomé Martínez González	January 1921	12 October 1923	Diego Manuel Chamorro	Martínez succeeded to the presidency
Juan Bautista Sacasa	1 January 1925	14 March 1926	Carlos José Solórzano	
Enoc Aguado Farfán	1 January 1929	1 January 1933	José María Moncada	
Rodolfo Espinosa Ramírez	1 January 1933	9 June 1936	Juan Bautista Sacasa	
Francisco Navarro Alvarado	January 1937	March 1939	Anastasio Somoza García	
Mariano Argüello Vargas	15 August 1947	22 November 1947	Víctor Manuel Román y Reyes	
Silvio Argüello Cardenal, Gustavo Raskosky and Lorenzo Guerrero Gutiérrez	1 May 1963	4 August 1966	René Schick	Guerrero succeeded to the presidency
Silvio Argüello Cardenal and Gustavo Raskosky	4 August 1966	1 May 1967	Lorenzo Guerrero Gutiérrez	
Francisco Urcuyo Maliaños and Alfonso Callejas Deshón	1 May 1967	1 May 1972	Anastasio Somoza Debayle	
Vacant	1 May 1972	10 January 1985		
Sergio Ramírez Mercado	10 January 1985	25 April 1990	Daniel Ortega	
Virgilio Godoy	25 April 1990	24 October 1995	Violeta Chamorro	Resigned to pursue presidency
Julia Mena	24 October 1995	10 January 1997	Violeta Chamorro	
Enrique Bolaños	10 January 1997	24 October 2000	Arnoldo Alemán	Resigned to pursue presidency
Leopoldo Navarro Bermúdez	24 October 2000	10 January 2002	Arnoldo Alemán	
José Rizo Castellón	10 January 2002	10 October 2005	Enrique Bolaños	Resigned to pursue presidency
Alfredo Gómez Urcuyo	10 October 2005	10 January 2007	Enrique Bolaños	
Jaime Morales Carazo	10 January 2007	10 January 2012	Daniel Ortega	
Omar Halleslevens	10 January 2012	10 January 2017	Daniel Ortega	
Rosario Murillo	10 January 2017	18 February 2025	Daniel Ortega	Resigned to become co-president with her husband

== See also ==
- List of current vice presidents
