= Eusebio Chamorro =

Argentine footballer

Personal information
- Full name: Eusebio Chamorro
- Date of birth: 22 November 1922
- Place of birth: Rosario, Argentina
- Position: Goalkeeper

Senior career*
Years	Team	Apps	(Gls)
1946–1950	Newell's Old Boys	47	(0)
1951	Boca Juniors	10	(0)
1951–1952	Independiente Santa Fe	45	(0)
1953–1956	Flamengo	55	(0)
1962	Newell's Old Boys	5	(0)
- * Club domestic league appearances and goals

Eusebio Chamorro (born 22 November 1922) was an Argentine football goalkeeper, who played in several Argentine, Brazilian and Colombian top-level clubs.

== Career ==
Born in Rosario, Eusebio Chamorro began his career in Newell's Old Boys in 1945. In December 1950 he joined Boca Juniors to play in a Center American tour. Chamorro also defended Independiente Santa Fe of Colombia in 1951, debuting on 15 April in a game against Cúcuta Deportivo. He joined Brazilian club Flamengo in 1953, debuting on 10 September, in a game against XV de Jaú. He left the club in 1956, after winning the Campeonato Carioca in the first year defending the club, and having played 55 games, Before he left the club, he won the Torneio Internacional do Rio de Janeiro in 1955. His last game for Flamengo was played on 10 October 1956, against Bonsucesso. He played for Newell's Old Boys in 1962.

== Honors ==
=== Club ===
Flamengo

- Campeonato Carioca: 1953
- Torneio Internacional do Rio de Janeiro: 1955
