= Nicolás Osorno =

Nicaraguan politician

David Nicolás Osorno (died May 31, 1918) was a Nicaraguan politician and the acting President of Nicaragua from August 1 to 5, 1889.

He served as acting president after Evaristo Carazo died in office, and he was succeeded by Roberto Sacasa.

Political offices
Preceded by Evaristo Carazo	President of Nicaragua; 1889	Succeeded by Roberto Sacasa
