= Salvador Machado =

President of Nicaragua, June-July 1893

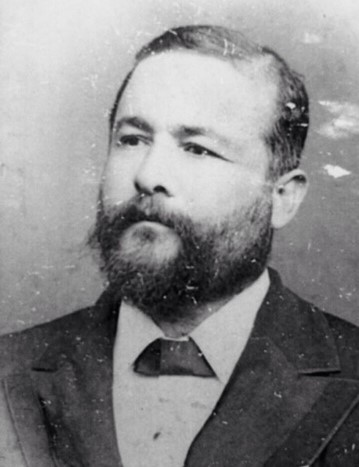

Salvador Machado Agüero (Ocotal, 1838 – Condega, 1925) was a Nicaraguan lawyer and politician appointed interim president of Nicaragua from June 1 to July 16, 1893.

Political offices
Preceded by Roberto Sacasa	President of Nicaragua; 1893	Succeeded by Joaquín Zavala
