= Jeffrey Gould =

American historian

Jeffrey L. Gould
- Citizenship: United States of America
- Occupation: Professor

Academic background
- Education: Yale University Universidad Nacional de Costa Rica

Academic work
- Discipline: History
- Sub-discipline: Latin American and Caribbean Studies
- Institutions: Indiana University

Jeffrey L. Gould is an American historian, currently the Distinguished Professor at Indiana University.

== Biography ==
Gould's work focuses on Central American social movements, ethnic conflicts, and political violence. Gould completed his academic training in history and Latin American studies across institutions in Central America and the United States. He earned a B.A. in History from Yale College in 1976 and later obtained a Licenciatura in Latin American Studies from the Universidad Nacional de Costa Rica in 1981. He then pursued graduate studies at Yale University, receiving an M.A. in History in 1984, an M.Phil. in 1986, and a Ph.D. in History in 1988.

== Works ==
- 2020. Entre el bosque y los árboles. Utopías Menores en El Salvador, Nicaragua y Uruguay. CALAS: Editoriales diversos.
- 2019. Solidarity under Siege. The Salvadorian Labor Movement, 1970–1990. Cambridge: Cambridge University Press.
- 2016. Desencuentros y Desafíos: Ensayos Sobre la Historia Contemporánea Centroamericana, Editorial de CIHAC, San Jose.
- 2008. To Rise in Darkness: Revolution. Repression and Memory in El Salvador, 1920–32 , (Aldo Lauria, co author) Durham: Duke University Press.
- 2004. Memorias de Mestizaje en América Central, La Política Cultural desde 1920, (coeditor with Darío Euraque and Charles R. Hale and author of several chapters) CIRMA.
- 1998. El Orgullo Amargo: El Movimiento Obrero Nicaragüense, 1920–1950, Managua: Editorial Universidad Centroamericana.
- 2002. The Twentieth Century: A Retrospective, coauthor, Westview Press.

== Filmography ==
- Scars of Memory: El Salvador, 1932 (2003, codirected with Carlos Henríquez Consalvi)
- La palabra en el bosque (2012, codirected with Carlos Henríquez Consalvi)

== Awards ==
- Distinguished Professor (Emeritus) – 2020
- Bicentennial Medal – 2020
- John W. Ryan Award for Distinguished Contributions to International Programs and Studies – 2013
- Titled Professor (Emeritus) – 2004
- Rudy Professor of History
- Guggenheim Fellow – 2002
- Fulbright Award – 1994
