= La Cuadra =

Coordinates: 28°28′05″S 67°41′28″W

- Municipality and village
- Interactive map of La Cuadra
- Country: Argentina
- Province: La Rioja Province
- Time zone: UTC−3 (ART)

La Cuadra is a municipality and village in La Rioja Province in northwestern Argentina.
