= Rosendo Chamorro =

Nicaraguan politician

President of Nicaragua
- Acting
- In office 12 October 1923 – 27 October 1923
- Preceded by: Diego Manuel Chamorro
- Succeeded by: Bartolomé Martínez

Personal details
- Born: Rosendo Chamorro Oreamuno; 8 February 1862 Granada, Nicaragua
- Died: Unknown
- Party: Conservative
- Spouse: Emilia Solorzano Gutierrez
- Children: 5
- Education: University of Paris

Rosendo Chamorro Oreamuno was Nicaraguan politician who briefly served as President in 1923. He received a doctorate from the University of Paris.

In 1923, he was Minister of the Interior of Nicaragua. When President Diego Manuel Chamorro died, Rosendo Chamorro was designated interim president until Vice President Bartolomé Martínez returned to the capital to be sworn in. He held the position of President for fifteen days.

== Genealogy ==
Rosendo Chamorro Oreamuno was born on 8 February 1862 in Granada to a very wealthy and politically influential family. His father, Dionisio Chamorro Alfaro is brother and half brother respectively to the presidents Pedro Joaquín Chamorro Alfaro and Frutos Chamorro Perez. His grandfather Pedro José Chamorro Argüello was the army general stationed in Granada, Nicaragua.

Rosendo is also first cousin to President Diego Manuel Chamorro Bolaños, and uncle to President Emiliano Chamorro Vargas. He is also Granduncle to Pedro Joaquín Chamorro Cardenal, wife of President Violeta Barrios de Chamorro.

Rosendo married Emilia Solorzano Gutierrez from Granada and had five children:

- Enrique Chamorro Solórzano married to María Carazo Morales, they had five children
- Emilia Chamorro Solórzano married to Rodolfo Vivas de Martini, they had three children
- Amalia Chamorro Solórzano married to William Godfrey
- Rosendo Chamorro Solórzano married to Agustina Benard Guzman, three children, and one child from Dominga Mercado
- Alejandro Chamorro Solórzano married to María Teresa Carazo Morales, they had four children, later married Maria Isabel Cuadra Cardenal and had ten children.

Political offices
Preceded by Diego Manuel Chamorro	President of Nicaragua; 1923	Succeeded by Bartolomé Martínez
