= Sebastián Uriza =

38th President of the Republic of Nicaragua

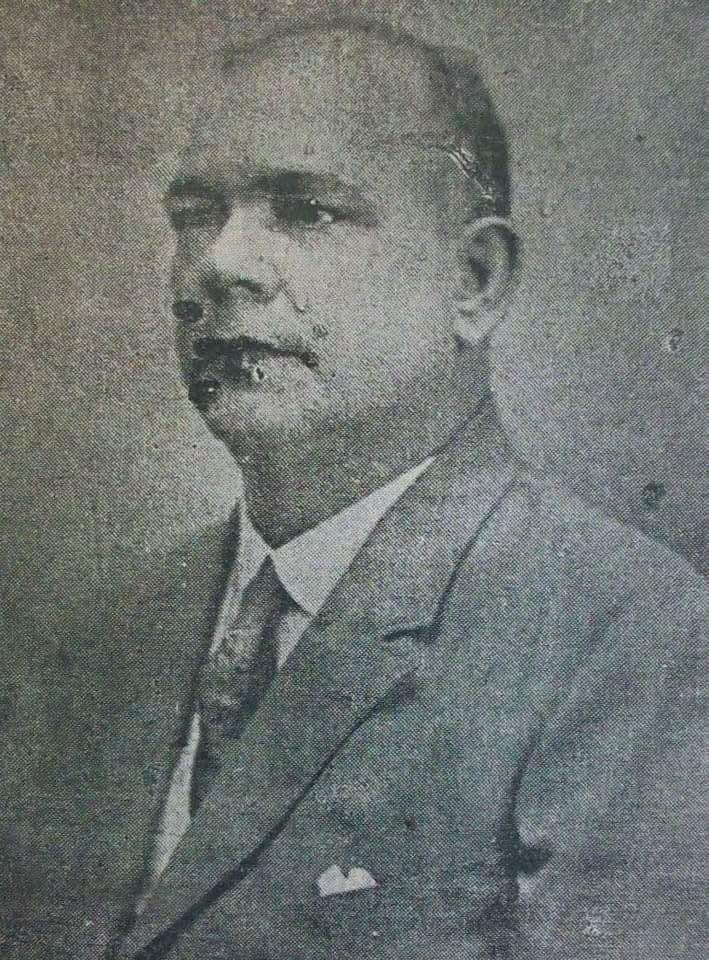
- Sebastián Uriza

President of Nicaragua
- In office 30 October 1926 – 11 November 1926
- Vice President: Vacant
- Preceded by: Emiliano Chamorro Vargas
- Succeeded by: Adolfo Díaz

Personal details
- Born: c. 1861 Bluefields, Nicaragua
- Died: 1936 (aged 75) Nicaragua
- Party: Conservative Party
- Spouse: Pastora Barberena y Marenco
- Parents: Canuto Uriza (father); Felicita de la Vega (mother)

Sebastián Uriza y Vega (1861 – after 1927) was a Nicaraguan politician and senator from Granada who was the President of Nicaragua from 30 October to 11 November 1926. Emiliano Chamorro appointed Uriza as his replacement, but Uriza's presidency was not recognized by any other continental governments.

Uriza was the president of the upper chamber of National Congress of Nicaragua in 1916, 1918–1922 and 1926–1927. He was president of the lower chamber in 1918.

Political offices
Preceded by Emiliano Chamorro	President of Nicaragua; 30 October 1926 – 11 November 1926	Succeeded by Adolfo Díaz
