= Vicente Cuadra Gómez =

- Died: 1943
- Known for: Founding Nicaraguan Chamber of Commerce
- Spouse: Victoria
- Children: 12
- Father: Jose Vicente Cuadra

Vicente Cuadra Gomez (1874–1943), a member of one of Nicaragua's most illustrious families (Cuadra), was an economist and founded the Nicaraguan Chamber of Commerce in 1900.

== Family and early life ==
His father was Jose Vicente Cuadra who served as president of Nicaragua in the early 1870s. As a young man, he worked as his father's secretary and wrote about his experience in the Cartas y Recuerdos (1941). Cuadra and his wife (Victoria) had twelve children, many of them prominent in their own right in Nicaragua and in the United States.

== Work ==
Vicente Cuadra Gomez was an economist and founded the Nicaraguan Chamber of Commerce in 1900, serving as the general manager until his death in 1943.

== Sources ==
- Revista Conservadora del Pensamiento Centroamericano Vol XVII, Genealogia de la Familia Quadra, Agosto 1967
- Cuadra – Chamberlain Family Interviews. PCCH Journal Vol 1, Fall 1971
