= Bartolomé Martínez =

Nicaraguan politician

Bartolomé Martínez González

President of Nicaragua
- In office 27 October 1923 – 1 January 1925
- Vice President: Vacant
- Preceded by: Rosendo Chamorro (Acting)
- Succeeded by: Carlos José Solórzano

Vice President of Nicaragua
- In office 1 January 1921 – 12 October 1923
- President: Diego Manuel Chamorro
- Preceded by: Nemesio Martínez
- Succeeded by: Juan Bautista Sacasa (1925)

Personal details
- Born: 1860 Jinotega, Nicaragua
- Died: 30 January 1936 (aged 75–76) Matagalpa, Nicaragua
- Party: Conservative

Bartolomé Martínez González (1860 in Jinotega – 30 January 1936 in Matagalpa) was a Nicaraguan politician from the Conservative Party. He was a coffee grower. He served as Vice President of Nicaragua from January 1921 to October 1923. After the death of Diego Manuel Chamorro, and after a brief period of 15 days where the Interior Minister, Rosendo Chamorro Oreamuno held office, while waiting for Martínez to return to the capital, he was sworn in to serve the remainder of Chamorro's term as President of Nicaragua from 27 October 1923 to 1 January 1925.

In a short time, he recovered on behalf of the national government the Customs Office, the Central Bank and the Railroad of Nicaragua, which were in the hands of the American bankers Brown and Seligman. He formed a National Government, including the Liberals.

Political offices
Preceded by Nemesio Martínez	Vice President of Nicaragua; 1921–1923	Succeeded by Juan Bautista Sacasa
Preceded by Rosendo Chamorro	President of Nicaragua; 1923–1925	Succeeded by Carlos José Solórzano
