= Pedro Joaquín Chamorro Alfaro =

President of Nicaragua (1875–1879)

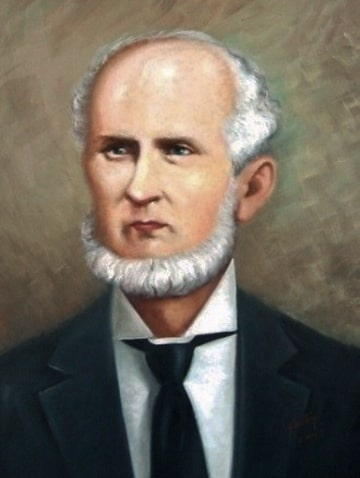
- Official portrait, c. 1875–1879

President of Nicaragua
- In office 1 March 1875 – 1 March 1879
- Preceded by: José Vicente Cuadra
- Succeeded by: Joaquín Zavala

Personal details
- Born: Pedro Joaquín Chamorro Alfaro; 29 June 1818 Granada, Province of Nicaragua, New Spain
- Died: 7 June 1890 (aged 71) Granada, Nicaragua
- Party: Conservative
- Spouse: Mercedes Oreamuno
- Children: 2
- Relatives: Emiliano Chamorro Vargas
- Occupation: Politician, Military Scientist

Pedro Joaquín Chamorro Alfaro (29 June 1818 – 7 June 1890) was a Nicaraguan politician who served as the President of Nicaragua from 1 March 1875 to 1 March 1879 and a member of the conservative dominant oligarchy Chamorro family.

== Background ==
He was a son of Pedro José Chamorro Argüello and wife Josefa Margarita Alfaro Monterroso and paternal grandson of Fernando Chamorro Lacayo (d. 1785) and wife Bárbara Nicolasa Argüello del Castillo. His brothers were Dionisio Chamorro Alfaro and Fernando Chamorro Alfaro. Dionisio was married to Mercedes Oreamuno and had two sons, Salvador Chamorro Oreamuno and Rosendo Chamorro Oreamuno, President of Nicaragua, the first of whom married Gregoria Vargas Báez and had Emiliano Chamorro Vargas, 55th and 59th President of Nicaragua. By Josefa Peréz ... his father had a natural son, born before his marriage, Fruto Chamorro Pérez, 30th and 31st President of Nicaragua.

His great-grandfather was Spanish Nobleman Diego Chamorro de Sotomayor y Murga de Villavicencio, born in Seville, who married no less than five times: to his great-grandmother Gregoria Lacayo de Briones y Pomar, Inés de Villa-Nueva y ..., Juana Fajardo y ..., Gertrudis de Pasos y ... and Rafaela Occonor y Salafranca, by whom he had a daughter Josefa Chamorro Occonor (1784 - 1843).

== Career ==
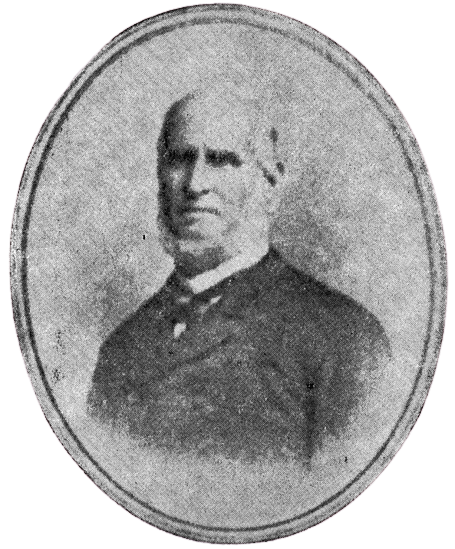
Photograph of Chamorro, 1879

At an early age, he left off studies to dedicate himself, together with his brother Dionisio, to the management of paternal inheritances under the guidance of their half-brother Fruto Chamorro. His first marriage was to N. Guadamuz; his second marriage was in 1854 with María de la Luz Bolaños Bendaña, born in 1828. They had three children:

- Filadelfo Chamorro Bolaños, married to Bertha Benard Vivas, and had:
  - Julio Chamorro Benard, married to Dolores "Lola" Coronel Urtecho, daughter of Manuel Coronel Matus and wife Blanca Urtecho Avilés and sister of José Coronel Urtecho, and had:
    - Edgar Chamorro Coronel, Chief of the Contras
    - Other six sons and four daughters
- Diego Manuel Chamorro Bolaños, 56th President of Nicaragua
- Pedro Joaquin Chamorro Bolaños, married to his cousin Ana María Zelaya Bolaños, and had:
  - Pedro Joaquín Chamorro Zelaya, married to Margarita Cardenal Argüello, daughter of Julio Cardenal Argüello and wife and cousin Adela Argüello Cervantes and maternal granddaughter of José María Argüello Peñalba and wife María Cervantes Montalván, and had:
    - Pedro Joaquín Chamorro Cardenal
    - Ana María Chamorro Cardenal, married to Carlos Holmann Thompson, and had:
      - Eduardo Holmann Chamorro
      - Verónica Holmann Chamorro
      - Hugo Holmann Chamorro
      - Ana Carolina Holmann Chamorro
      - Bruno Holmann Chamorro
      - Ericka Holmann Chamorro
      - Juan Lorenzo Holmann Chamorro
    - Ligia Chamorro y Cardenal
      - Ximena Barreto
      - Samuel Barreto
      - Leonardo Barreto
      - Juan Diego Barreto
      - Dominica Barreto
      - Paola Barreto
    - Jaime Chamorro y Cardenal
    - Xavier Chamorro Cardenal

In 1849 Pedro Joaquín Chamorro became mayor of Granada and in 1854, he participated in the defense of the city, besieged by Máximo Jerez. He also contributed to the struggle to expel William Walker, the American filibuster. In 1862 he dedicated himself to politics as Senator of the Department of Granada. In 1869, he became a member of the governing junta of Nicaragua. He was elected president in 1871 for four years, and again joined the ruling junta in 1885. He was president of the Nicaraguan Congress 1869-1870, 1881-1882 and 1883.

In both his public and private life, Don Pedro was considered progressive by some and an opportunist by many others, when conservative forces would keep "campesinos" without access to education. He represented a faction of the Granada oligarchy and maintained strong conservative principles, which in Latin America meant the preservation of a feudal economic system, with an emphasis on trade. His influence would help form Nicaragua as a nation with the limitations of keeping the country and its economic resources under the control of a few families including the Chamorro and the few other families that still control Nicaragua economically today. He remained a political force in Nicaragua until his death on 7 June 1890.

Political offices
Preceded by Vicente Cuadra	President of Nicaragua; 1875–1879	Succeeded by Joaquín Zavala
