= Carlos José Solórzano =

Nicaraguan politician

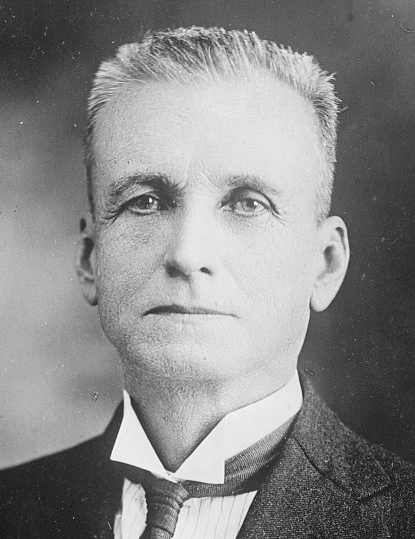
- Photograph of Solórzano

President of Nicaragua
- In office 1 January 1925 – 14 March 1926
- Vice President: Juan Bautista Sacasa
- Preceded by: Bartolomé Martínez
- Succeeded by: Emiliano Chamorro Vargas

Personal details
- Born: 17 January 1860 Managua, Nicaragua
- Died: 30 August 1936 (aged 76) San José, Costa Rica
- Party: Conservative
- Spouse: Leonor Rivas Solórzano
- Relatives: Fernando Solórzano (brother)

Carlos José Solórzano Gutiérrez (17 January 1860 in Managua – 30 August 1936 in San José, Costa Rica) was the President of Nicaragua between 1 January 1925 and 14 March 1926.

== History ==
He headed a political coalition which was moderate Conservative which led to his rise as the Conservative Party received United States assistance in attaining power. But when the detachment of U.S. Marines which had remained in Nicaragua for thirteen years withdrew, it led to his downfall. In October 1925, the government of Solórzano was overthrown in a coup by former President General Emiliano Chamorro, who failed to gain U.S. recognition and subsequently resigned in favor of Adolfo Díaz.

== Biography ==
He was the son of Federico Solórzano Reyes and wife Rosa Gutiérrez and paternal grandson of Ramón Solórzano Montealegre and wife Juana Reyes Robira, who by his second wife Mónica Cardoze was the father of Enrique Solórzano Cardoze, married to Luz Vasconcelos, both of Portuguese descent, and had Marina Solórzano Vasconcelos, married to Fernando Abaunza Cuadra, whose daughter Esmeralda Abaunza Solórzano married her first cousin Alejandro Abaunza Espinoza, son of Carlos Abaunza Cuadra and wife Dolores Espinoza and had Lila T. Abaunza, First Lady of Nicaragua, married to Enrique Bolaños, 82nd President of Nicaragua.

He was married to his cousin Leonor Rivas Solórzano, his son being Carlos Jose Solorzano Rivas.

His brother, Fernando Solórzano, was Vice President of Nicaragua. He was a relative of Fernando Guzmán, former President of Nicaragua.

He was the brother of Rosa Solorzano Gutierrez. Rosa Solorzano Gutierrez was the mother Lisimaco Jr. Lacayo Solorzano. Lisimaco Lacayo Solorzano was married to Berta Lacayo Sacasa, and they had two children Chester Lacayo Lacayo and Will Lacayo Lacayo. Will Lacayo Lacayo was married to Graciela Aviles Lacayo and had four children: Danilo Lacayo, Berta Lacayo, Ligia Lacayo, and Tania Lacayo.

Political offices
Preceded by Bartolomé Martínez	President of Nicaragua; 1925–1926	Succeeded by Emiliano Chamorro
