= Diego Manuel Chamorro =

President of Nicaragua from 1921 to 1923

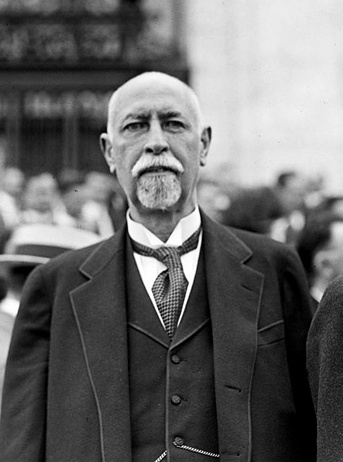
- Chamorro in 1919

President of Nicaragua
- In office 1 January 1921 – 12 October 1923
- Vice President: Bartolomé Martínez
- Preceded by: Emiliano Chamorro Vargas
- Succeeded by: Rosendo Chamorro

Personal details
- Born: 9 August 1861 Nandaime, Nicaragua
- Died: 12 October 1923 (aged 62) Managua, Nicaragua
- Party: Conservative
- Spouse: Dolores Bolaños Chamorro

Diego Manuel Chamorro Bolaños (9 August 1861 – 12 October 1923) was a Nicaraguan politician who served as the President of Nicaragua between 1 January 1921 and 12 October 1923. He was a member of the Conservative Party of Nicaragua.

He was born in Nandaime and was a member of the politically powerful Chamorro family. His father was Pedro Joaquín Chamorro Alfaro.

== Presidency ==
Diego was praised for his performance under president Adolfo Díaz from both conservative and liberal politicians.

Don Diego was elected President of Nicaragua in 1921, following his nephew Emiliano in that office. The elections faced significant interference from the United States, and was characterized by irregularities. His government faced hard times with questions of electoral fraud, and lack of legitimacy. During his presidency, he crushed an invasion by rebels from Honduras and initiated an agreement between himself and the presidents of Honduras and El Salvador to prevent such invasions in the future. He also signed the Treaty of Peace and Friendship among the Central American countries. Like his predecessor, he continued being obsequious to United states.

The war had a negative impact on the Nicaraguan economy, which was in deep recession since his taking oath of office.

President Diego Manuel Chamorro died in office in 1923, in Managua, aged 62.

Political offices
| Preceded by Emiliano Chamorro | President of Nicaragua; 1921–1923 | Succeeded by Rosendo Chamorro |
