= José Vicente Cuadra =

President of Nicaragua

José Vicente de la Cuadra y Ruy Lugo
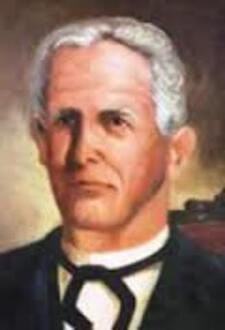

President of Nicaragua
- In office 1 March 1871 – 1 March 1875
- Preceded by: Fernando Guzmán Solórzano
- Succeeded by: Pedro Joaquín Chamorro Alfaro

Personal details
- Born: José Vicente Cuadra Lugo; 25 July 1812 Granada, Captaincy General of Guatemala, New Spain
- Died: 10 December 1894 (aged 82) Granada, Nicaragua
- Party: Conservative
- Spouse: Josefa Gómez y Bendaña
- Children: 9
- Occupation: Politician

José Vicente de la Cuadra y Ruy Lugo (25 July 1812, in Granada, Nicaragua – 10 December 1894) served as President of Nicaragua from 1 March 1871 to 1 March 1875 during that country's late-19th-century reconstruction. As a member of the Conservative Party, he governed in the early years of the era to be known as the Thirty Five Years of Conservatism in Nicaragua's political history. Cuadra's family had roots in Nicaragua since the days of the conquistadors. The Cuadra family's wealth and power came from interests in banking, agriculture, and mining. During most of his lifetime, Vicente Cuadra was one of the richest landowners in the country.

== Presidency ==
Vicente Cuadra was elected by a landslide but was reluctant to serve due to poor health. However, he decided to serve in the best interests of the country after the Congress gave him an overwhelming vote of confidence and a mandate. His presidency was a reflection of his character – ethical, frugal, and visionary. The Cuadra administration instituted a system of checks and balances in the executive branch, re-established the credit worthiness of the country, replenished the treasury, and positioned the war ravaged nation for much needed infrastructure improvements and projects which occurred during his successor's (Pedro Joaquín Chamorro Alfaro) term. Educational, judicial, and scientific reforms were also implemented. Critics thought Cuadra as stingy and rigid. The biggest failure of his administration was the inability to deal with the Miskito tribal nation in the eastern region of Nicaragua.

== Elder statesman ==
Vicente Cuadra really didn't enjoy being in the front lines of politics. His brother, Jose Joaquin, was better suited for that. Vicente, himself, preferred working behind the scenes like he did when he helped draft the Constitution of 1858. When his term of office was over, Cuadra retired to spending time with his family, overseeing his businesses, and writing. He didn't get much involved in the politics of the country and would rarely offer the opinion of a statesman unless it was warranted. The irony is that in 1891, Gen. José Santos Zelaya of the Liberal Party, taking advantage of splits within the Conservative party, began an economic and political campaign to ruin all of the Conservatives in the country, targeting the icons such as Vicente Cuadra. The former president's businesses were wiped out, most of his lands were confiscated, and his writings were burned. The final insult was that the 79-year-old Cuadra was imprisoned for a few weeks.

== Legacy ==
Cuadra is one of the least known of Nicaragua's presidents due to:

1. His writings burned in the destruction of his hometown of Granada in 1856 by the forces of William Walker and again in 1891 by Zelaya confederates.
2. The destruction of government's archives in the Managua earthquake of 1931
3. The Cuadra family, especially his son/secretary Vicente Cuadra Gomez, hesitancy to say or write anything about the former president because of "being eyewitness to Zelaya's cruelty and evil"; the family mantra for a couple of generations was no political involvement.

Since 1854, approximately forty individuals have served as the President of Nicaragua. Among a select few, Vicente Cuadra is considered a model president in Nicaragua's presidential history. He has the reputation of being an honest president and a respected statesman.

== Death ==
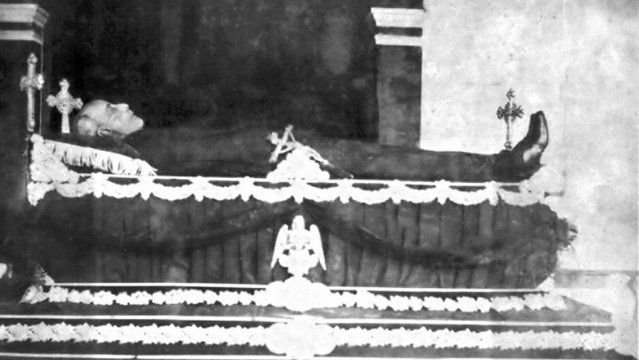

The former president died in the early morning of December 10, 1894, in his hometown of Granada surrounded by family and friends (He had outlived most of his contemporaries). The cause of death was old age/natural causes but everyone present felt it was due to various ailments brought on by his imprisonment. His funeral/burial was filled with honors and attended by a who's who of Nicaraguans except for one – Zelaya.

== Direct descendants ==
Vicente Cuadra Lugo with his wife procreated seven children; he had two other children with a mistress for a total of nine children. Thirty four grandchildren were procreated and over a hundred great-grandchildren. The family tree has been very fruitful and abundant with its main branches in Nicaragua and the United States. As with any family, there are many stories, myths, and legends, along with its share of saints and sinners but the touchstone is El Presidente Vicente Cuadra.

Other family relations such as a former first lady of Nicaragua, the late Lila T Abaunza and Pablo Alberto Cuadra Arguello (poet, theologian) are part of the larger Cuadra family tree as is the late president.

== Sources ==
- Revista Conservadora del Pensamiento Centroamericano Vol XVII, Genealogia de la Familia Quadra, Agosto 1967
- Nicaragua's Conservative Republic 1858-93. The Americas, July 2004
- Muerte y exequias del ex presidente Vicente Quadra, El Nuevo Dario, November 2010
- Cartas y Recuerdos de don Vicente Cuadra Gomez 1941
- Cuadra - Chamberlain Family Interviews. PCCH Journal Vol 1, Fall 1971
- Pablo Antonio Cuadra Cardenal Interview. PCCH Journal Vol 1, Fall 1971
- Pedro Joaquin Chamarro Cardenal Interview. PCCH Journal Vol 1, Fall 1971
- Fotos y Imagines archivos de familia Cuadra Chamberlain

Political offices
Preceded by Fernando Guzmán	President of Nicaragua; 1871–1875	Succeeded by Pedro Joaquín Chamorro
