= José María Moncada =

President of Nicaragua from 1929 to 1933 (1870–1945)

Jose Maria Moncada Tapia
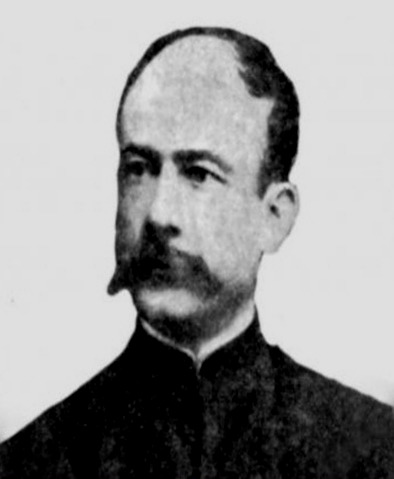
- Moncada in 1910

President of Nicaragua
- In office 1 January 1929 – 1 January 1933
- Vice President: Enoc Aguado Farfán
- Preceded by: Adolfo Díaz
- Succeeded by: Juan Bautista Sacasa

Personal details
- Born: 8 December 1870 San Rafael del Sur, Nicaragua
- Died: 23 February 1945 (aged 74) Managua, Nicaragua
- Party: Liberal Party José Nemecio Moncada Castañeda (father) Zoila Eva Mayrhauser Tapia (mother)

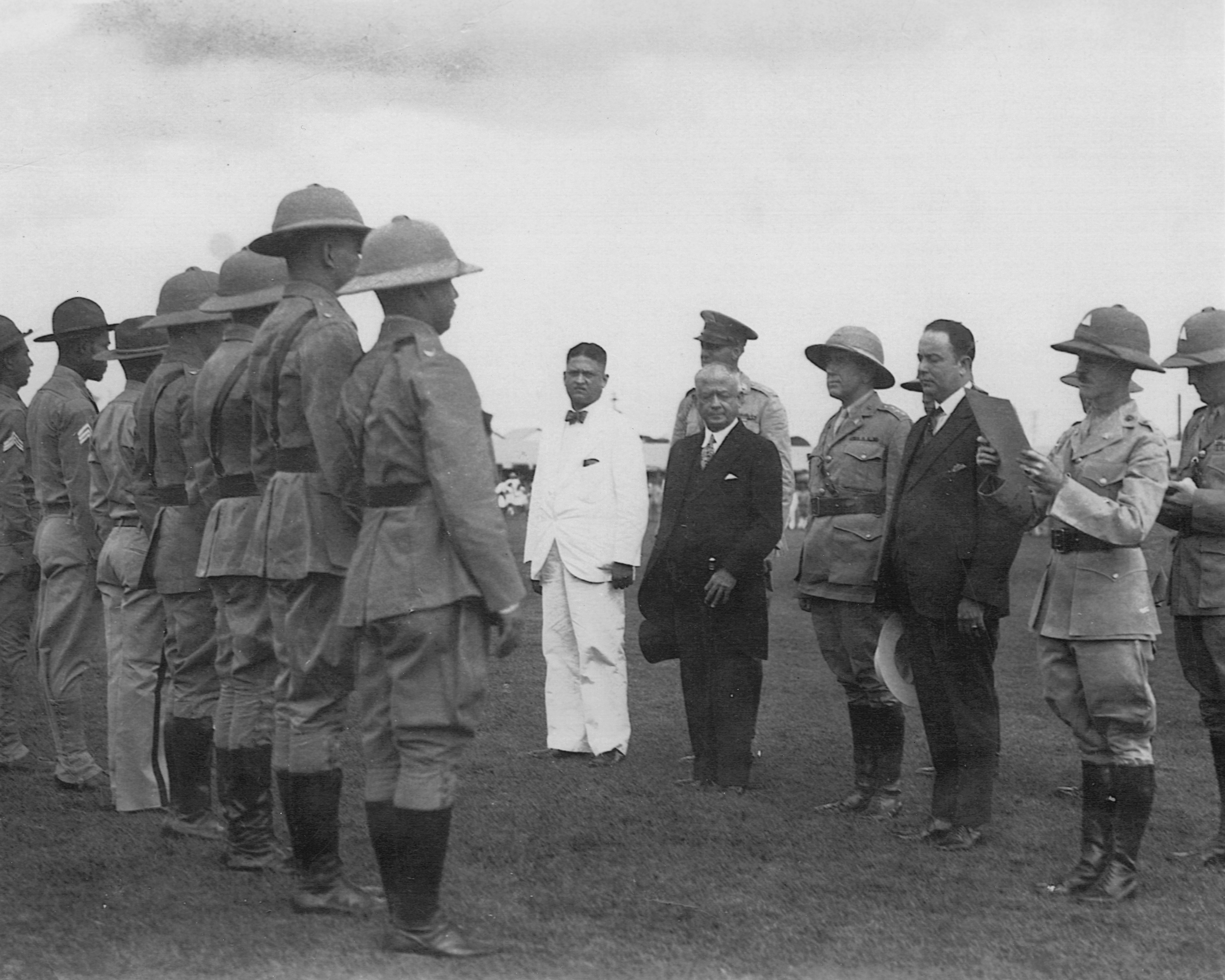
U.S. Marine review by President José María Moncada Tapia and Gen. Anastasio Somoza Garcia, Managua, 1930.

José María Moncada Tapia (8 December 1870 – 23 February 1945) was the President of Nicaragua from 1 January 1929 to 1 January 1933.

== Political career ==
Born to a wealthy family of Spanish and Austrian descent, Moncada rose to fame as one of the principal Conservative generals responsible for the overthrow of the Liberal dictator José Santos Zelaya in 1910. He had begun his career in Nicaraguan politics as a journalist for a Conservative newspaper published in Granada. During the Zelaya dictatorship, Moncada published a pro-government newspaper, but by 1906 he had fallen out with the dictator and had fled to Honduras. There he served as undersecretary of the interior until the Conservative revolt against Zelaya began. After Zelaya's ouster, Moncada served as secretary of the interior in the Conservative government from 1910 to 1911. Moncada, however, fell out with the Conservatives and switched his allegiance to the Liberal Party. Moncada was a member of the Liberal Party. In 1910 José Santos Zelaya from the Liberal Party stepped down from government. In 1925 his continuing opposition to Conservative control of the Nicaraguan government forced him to flee to Costa Rica, where he continued to build support for a return of the Liberals to power.

After President Adolfo Díaz was re-elected in 1926, a coup by General Emiliano Chamorro (following the withdrawal of the Marines) failed to win U.S. support, Liberal forces rebelled in an attempt to overthrow Díaz's government. Moncada was one of the leaders, together with Juan Bautista Sacasa and Augusto César Sandino. The United States provided military support for the Díaz government and the Liberal forces were on the verge of seizing Managua when the U.S. forced the warring parties to accept a power-sharing agreement, the Espino Negro accord. Moncada and Sacasa made peace, but Sandino refused and continued the fight and waged a guerrilla war against the U.S. Marines. But in 1928, after elections supervised by the Marines, Díaz was replaced as president by Moncada.

== Nicaraguan Constitutional War (1926-1927) ==
=== Background ===
For many years, conflict brewed between the Liberal and Conservative Parties in Nicaragua. The Liberal Party, which "advocated manhood suffrage, separation of Church and State, and the advancement of the material wealth of the country", held power between 1893 and 1909 under the control of President José Santos Zelaya. In 1909, the Conservative Party launched a US-supported revolution, with most Americans "aid[ing] the revolutionary party because of Zelaya’s oppressive acts" and a "[desire] to see the concessions cancelled so that they could get in on the lands and make 'denouncements' for mining and agricultural purposes'". Further American intervention led to the deployment of US troops in Nicaragua from 1909 to 1933, with a brief exception during 1925 that set the stage for the Nicaraguan Civil War.

=== Actions before and after the Nicaraguan Constitutional War (1926-1927) ===
The U.S. Marines withdrew their forces from Nicaragua in 1925, prompting General Emiliano Chamorro to rise "in rebellion against a new regime". He successfully installed himself as president, but the United States refused to recognize his regime. Although Chamorro offered to resign in favor of a designated successor, the U.S. State Department "insisted upon the selection of its favorite, Adolfo Díaz, as provisional president". Former President Adolfo Díaz assumed the presidency after Chamorro's resignation, spurring several Liberal leaders, including José María Moncada to rebel. In response, the United States sent troops in 1926 to force an armistice and eventual resolution to the conflict. Emiliano Chamorro and José María Moncada agreed to the armistice, but "the peace talks failed because of the refusal of the Liberals to accept a compromise government".

Incensed by the collaboration between the Conservative Party's leadership and the US government, Moncada refused to recognize the new Díaz government. On 1 December 1926, he initiated a new Liberal offensive at Puerto Cabezas. The U.S. responded by "creating six neutral zones along the east coast, [expelling] the Liberal government from Puerto Cabezas, and dumping Liberal munitions into the harbor". Augusto Sandino, an ally of the Liberal Party, proposed the creation of a revolutionary force that would continue the struggle against the U.S.-Conservative coalition. He was unable to impress José María Moncada, who was "reluctant to turn over precious arms and munitions to [an] unknown guerrilla". Despite rejection by the Liberal leadership, "the rank and file among the Liberals were more sympathetic" and Sandino would go on to establish a revolutionary force after the compromise between the Liberal and Conservative Parties.

By 1928, US Secretary of State Henry Stimson had become involved in the conflict. The American public was growing weary of the presence of US Marines in Nicaragua and the US government was looking for ways to quickly withdraw its forces. Given the Liberal Party's inability to achieve electoral victories under the previous system, Stimson approached Moncada "with a plan designed to permit Liberal success at the polls". Moncada accepted, telling Stimson that "while there will probably be resistance by small irreconcilable groups and scattered bandits, [he believed] that there will be no organized resistance to our action". Eleven of the twelve lieutenants under Moncada accepted Stimson's plan. Only Augusto Sandino and his forces refused. They retreated "into Nicaragua’s rugged northwest" and "attacked a much smaller group of marines and constabulary at Ocotal".

Despite this complication, the plan to hold free elections was implemented and the "US Marines supervised the registration and voting procedures". Nicaraguans were provided the opportunity to vote and, after the Liberal Party's electoral victory, "José María Moncada was installed as Nicaragua’s president".

Moncada's victory surprised many Nicaraguans since his opponent, Adolfo Díaz of the Conservative Party, was a close ally of the US who "owed [it] his entire political career". His victory, however, had been assured "by the settlement imposed by President Coolidge's special emissary Henry Stimson to end the brief civil war between Conservatives and Liberals in 1927". The Liberal Party, which had been denied power through electoral victories, had planned an uprising, "hoping to drag the United States into the fray". Stimson's negotiations recognized that the Liberals would not accept anything less than success and, in order to reach a quick result that would allow the US to leave Nicaragua, assisted his victory. Sandino's violent response to the election of Moncada, however, ensured that US Marines would remain in the country for the foreseeable future since the "1927 Stimson ultimatum had disbanded Nicaragua’s partisan armed forces". To create a force that could maintain stability in Nicaragua, the United States created the Nicaraguan National Guard and "provided it with arms and training, while at the same time continuing the fight against Sandino’s rebels".

Moncada asked the US for assistance in stabilizing the country throughout his presidency. The Wall Street crash of 1929 increased President Herbert Hoover's "desire to remove the remaining US troops from Nicaragua". Despite President Hoover's reluctance to intervene in Nicaragua, Moncada succeeded in requesting that "the United States supervise Nicaragua’s 1930 non-presidential elections" and securing enough money from President Hoover in 1932 to "chair half the election boards", thus ensuring that Juan Sacasa, another Liberal politician, would win the 1932 election.

Moncada was the president of the upper chamber of National Congress of Nicaragua 1942–1943.

== Descendants ==
General, then President Moncada's first marriage, on January 1, 1890, was to Ms. Margarita Carranza Monterrey, their children being Elsa, Aquiles, Elio, Hernaldo, Lesbia and Alba Moncada Carranza.

From his second marriage to Ms. Josefa Reyes Gadea, his children were Leda Maria, Omar and the late Óscar Moncada Reyes, who served as President of the National Assembly of Nicaragua from 1999 until 2001.

== Selected works ==
- Moncada, J. M., & Gahan, A. C. (1912). The social world.
- Moncada, J. M. (1913). Justice!: An appeal to the Executive Power and the Senate of the United States. New York: [s.n.].
- Moncada, J. M., & Gahan, A. C. (1911). Imperialism and the Monroe doctrine (their influence in Central America).
- Moncada, J. M., & Gahan, A. C. (1911). Social and political influence of the United States in Central America. New York: s.n

Political offices
Preceded by Adolfo Díaz	President of Nicaragua; 1929–1933	Succeeded by Juan Bautista Sacasa
