= Conservative Party (Nicaragua) =

Conservative Party Partido Conservador
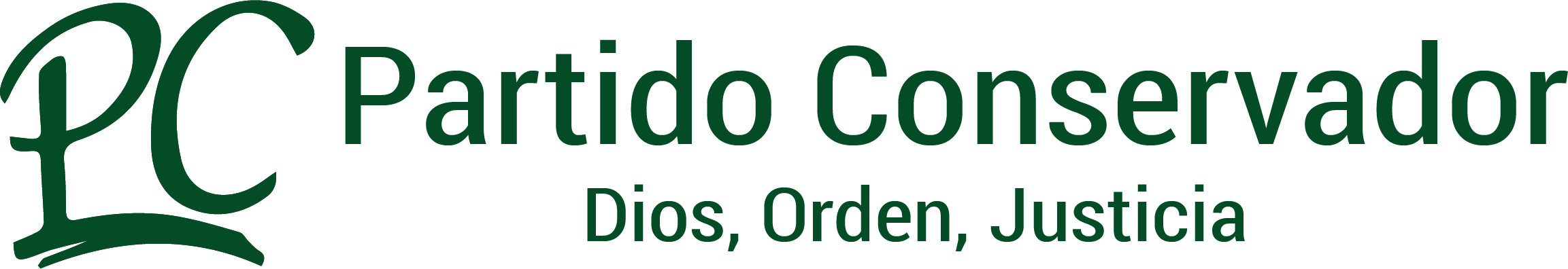
- Leader: Alfredo César Aguirre
- Founded: 27 October 1851 (174 years, 135 days)
- Dissolved: 19 May 2021 (4 years, 296 days)
- Preceded by: Legitimist Party
- Headquarters: Managua
- Ideology: Conservatism (Nicaraguan); Christian democracy Social conservatism National conservatism
- Political position: Right-wing
- National affiliation: Nicaraguan Liberal Alliance
- Regional affiliation: Union of Latin American Parties
- International affiliation: International Democracy Union; Centrist Democrat International
- Colors: Green
- Seats in the National Assembly: 0 / 92

Party flag

Website
- www.pconservador.org

The Conservative Party (Spanish: Partido Conservador) was a conservative political party in Nicaragua. Its slogan was "Dios, Orden, Justicia" (lit. 'God, Order, Justice'), often depicted on the three sides of a triangle.

== History ==
The party was one of the oldest in Nicaragua. It was founded during the 19th century, as Nicaragua established itself as an independent republic, by members of the elite of Granada. As in many Latin American countries, a major political conflict took place between conservatives and liberals. During the 1840s and 1850s a nearly constant civil war took place between conservatives and liberals in Nicaragua. In 1857 the conservatives won, and dominated the country for 35 years.

In 1893 the party split, and the liberals took advantage of this to make a successful rebellion. The conservative party returned to power in 1910, following the intervention of American troops. It remained in power until another liberal rebellion in 1926, and a coalition government was established.

Factions of the Conservative Party, along with factions of the Liberal Party, helped Anastasio Somoza Garcia to gain power. Somoza established his own party, the Nationalist Liberal Party, and though the Somoza regime was overthrown in 1979, the conservative party has never recovered the amount of power that it had during previous times. Many conservatives, however, vigorously opposed the Somoza regime, and for the 1967 elections formed a National Opposition Union with other parties opposed to the Somoza regime. In the first elections after the Revolution, in 1984, the Conservatives finished runner-up behind the FSLN. In 1990 the Conservative Party joined the new National Opposition Union to successfully oppose the Sandinista National Liberation Front in elections. Following the rapid collapse of that party, the conservatives became the third largest political force in the country, but much smaller than the Sandinistas or the Constitutional Liberal Party. At the legislative elections, held on 4 November 2001, the party won 2.1% of the popular vote and 2 out of 90 seats in the National Assembly. The same day, Alberto Saborío won only 1.4% in the presidential elections. In the 2006 election it became part of a coalition with the Nicaraguan Liberal Alliance.

== Current status ==
In 2006 the party joined another coalition party, the Nicaraguan Liberal Alliance, to support the former Constitutional Liberal politician Eduardo Montealegre in its presidential campaign, which was unsuccessful. The Conservative Party also supported and participated with the Nicaraguan Liberal Alliance in the congressional elections, in which the Nicaraguan Liberal Alliance came in third place but won nearly as many seats as the Constitutional Liberal Party.

== Conservative Presidents of Nicaragua ==
1. Fruto Chamorro (1854–1855)
2. José María Estrada (1854–1855)
3. Ponciano Corral Acosta (1855)
4. Fermín Ferrer (1856-1856)
5. Tomás Martínez Guerrero (1857- 1867)
6. Fernando Chamorro y Alfaro (1860)
7. Fernando Guzmán Solórzano (1867–1871)
8. José Vicente Cuadra (1871–1875)
9. Pedro Joaquín Chamorro Alfaro (1875–1879)
10. Joaquín Zavala (1879–1883)
11. Adán Cárdenas del Castillo (1883–1887)
12. Evaristo Carazo Aranda (1887–1889)
13. Nicolás Osorno (1889)
14. Roberto Sacasa (1889- 1891)
15. Ignacio Chávez López (1891)
16. Roberto Sacasa (1891–1893)
17. Eduardo Montiel de la Cerda (1893)
18. Salvador Machado (1893)
19. Joaquín Zavala (1893)
20. Luis Mena Vado (1910)
21. Adolfo Díaz (1911–1917)
22. Emiliano Chamorro Vargas (1917–1921)
23. Diego Manuel Chamorro (1921–1923)
24. Rosendo Chamorro Oreamuno (1923)
25. Bartolomé Martínez González (1923–1925)
26. Carlos José Solórzano Gutiérrez(1925–1926)
27. Emiliano Chamorro Vargas (1926)
28. Sebastián Uriza (1926)
29. Adolfo Díaz (1926- 1929)
