= Adolfo Díaz =

President of Nicaragua from 1911 to 1917 and 1926 to 1929

Adolfo Díaz Recinos
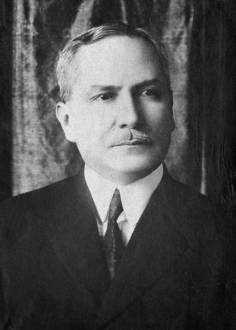
- Díaz in 1933

President of Nicaragua
- In office 14 November 1926 – 1 January 1929
- Vice President: Vacant
- Preceded by: Sebastián Uriza
- Succeeded by: José María Moncada
- In office 9 May 1911 – 1 January 1917
- Vice President: Fernando Solórzano
- Preceded by: Juan José Estrada
- Succeeded by: Emiliano Chamorro Vargas

Vice President of Nicaragua
- In office 29 August 1910 – 9 May 1911
- President: Juan José Estrada
- Preceded by: Office Reestablished
- Succeeded by: Fernando Solórzano

Personal details
- Born: 15 July 1875 Alajuela, Costa Rica
- Died: 29 January 1964 (aged 88) San José, Costa Rica
- Party: Conservative
- Occupation: Politician

Adolfo Díaz Recinos (15 July 1875 – 29 January 1964) served as the President of Nicaragua between 9 May 1911 and 1 January 1917 and again between 14 November 1926 and 1 January 1929. Born in Costa Rica to Nicaraguan parents in 1875, he worked as a secretary for the La Luz y Los Angeles Mining Company, an American company chartered in Delaware that owned the large gold mines around Siuna in eastern Nicaragua. In this capacity, he helped channel funds to the revolt against Liberal President José Santos Zelaya, who had incurred the anger of the United States by negotiating with Germany and Japan to resurrect the proposed Nicaragua Canal.

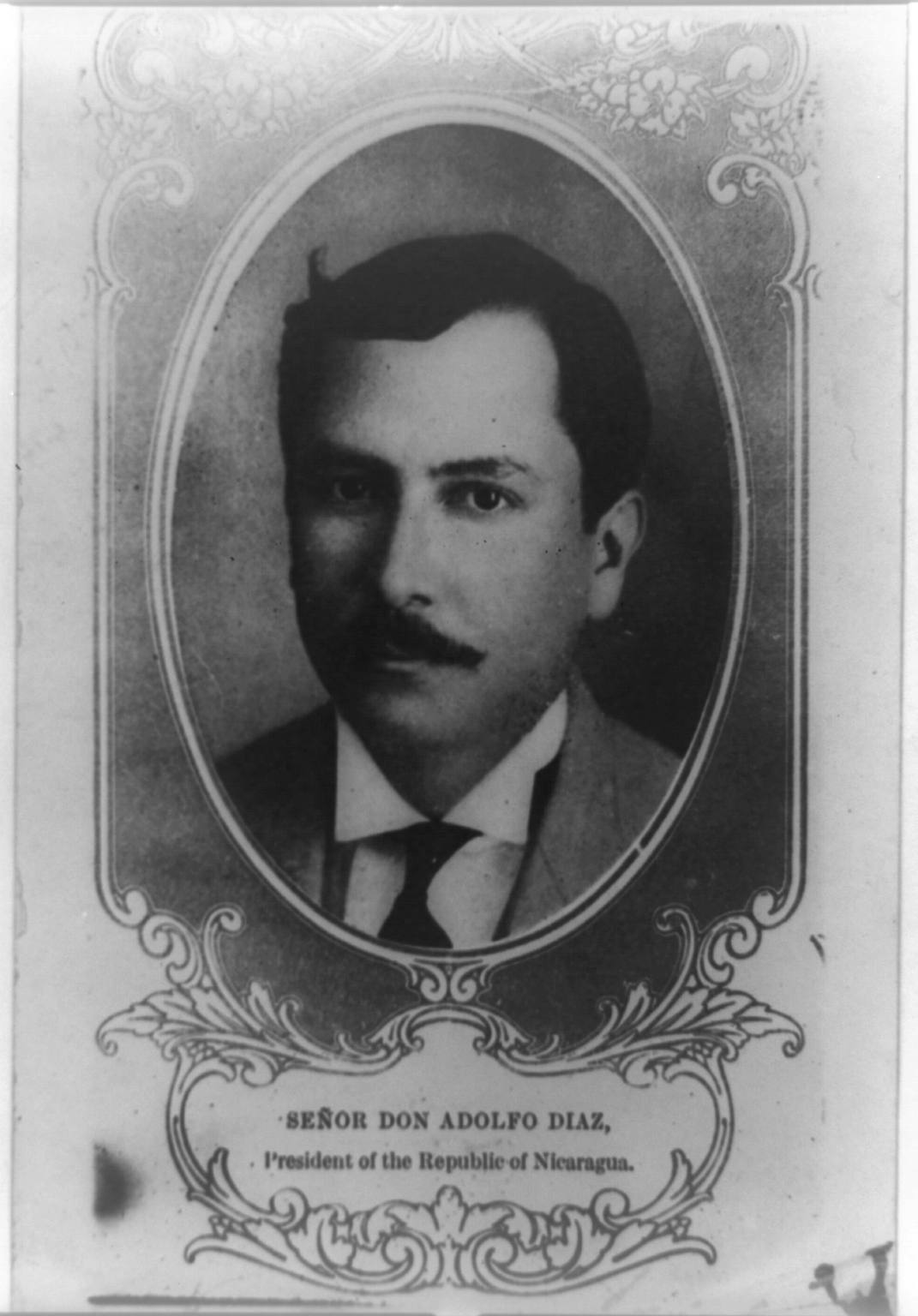
Diaz in 1912

Díaz became Vice President of Nicaragua in 1910. After he became president in 1911, Díaz was forced to rely on U.S. Marines to put down a Liberal revolt, which resulted in a contingent of Marines remaining in Nicaragua for over a decade. In return, in 1914, he signed the Bryan–Chamorro Treaty, which granted the United States exclusive rights to build an inter-oceanic canal across Nicaragua.

After his term as president ended, Díaz briefly lived in the United States. However, he returned to the presidency in 1926, after a coup by General Emiliano Chamorro (following the withdrawal of the Marines) failed to win U.S. support. During his second term as president, another Liberal revolt occurred. The Liberal forces were on the verge of seizing Managua when the U.S. forced the warring parties to accept a power-sharing agreement, the Espino Negro accord. One Liberal commander, Augusto César Sandino, rejected the agreement and waged a guerrilla war against the U.S. Marines, who remained in the country to prop up Díaz's government and enforce the Espino Negro accord. In 1928, after elections supervised by the Marines, Díaz was replaced as president by former Liberal General José María Moncada. Afterwards, he acquired control of several of Nicaragua's gold mines, which had been destroyed during raids by Sandino's forces. He unsuccessfully tried to restore mining operations for the La Luz Company, until they sold their holdings to the Nevada-based Tonopah Mining Company.

In 1936, after Anastasio Somoza García seized power, Díaz took up permanent residency in the United States. He lived in the U.S. for more than a decade, primarily in New York City but also in Miami and New Orleans, before moving to Costa Rica, where he died in 1964.

Political offices
Preceded by Francisco Baca	Vice President of Nicaragua; 1910–1911	Succeeded by Fernando Solórzano
Preceded by Juan José Estrada	President of Nicaragua; 1911–1917	Succeeded by Emiliano Chamorro
Preceded by Sebastián Uriza	President of Nicaragua; 1926–1929	Succeeded by José María Moncada
