= Emiliano Chamorro Vargas =

President of Nicaragua from 1917 to 1921 and briefly in 1926

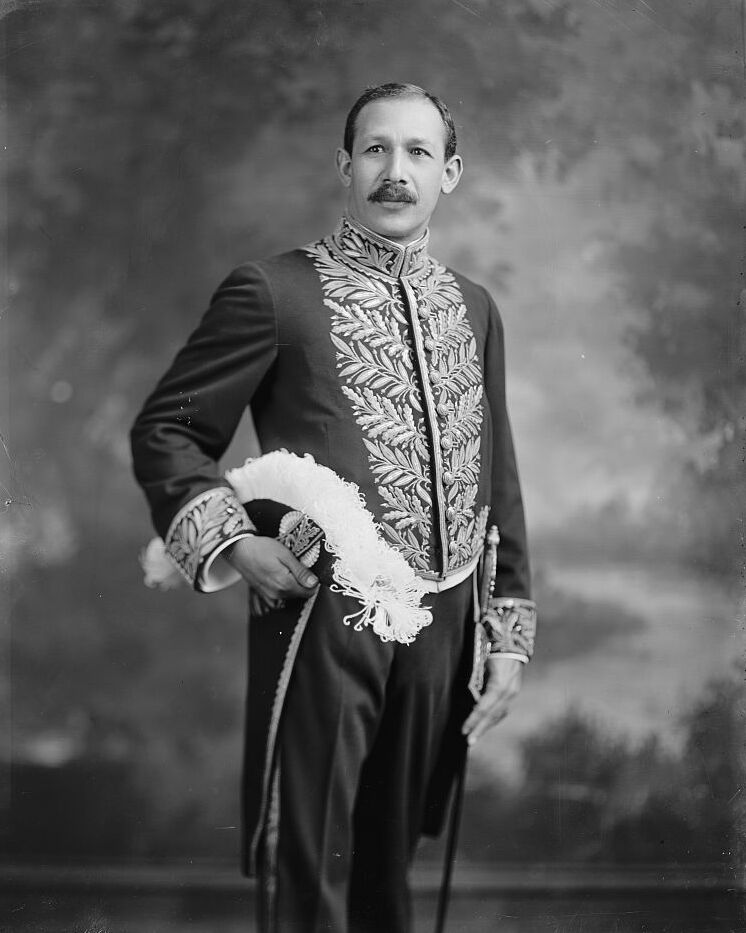

President of Nicaragua
- In office 14 March 1926 – 11 November 1926
- Preceded by: Carlos José Solórzano
- Succeeded by: Sebastián Uriza
- In office 1 January 1917 – 1 January 1921
- Vice President: Nemesio Martínez
- Preceded by: Adolfo Díaz
- Succeeded by: Diego Manuel Chamorro Bolaños

Personal details
- Born: 11 May 1871 Acoyapa, Nicaragua
- Died: 26 February 1966 (aged 94) Managua, Nicaragua
- Party: Conservative Party
- Relations: Pedro Joaquín Chamorro Alfaro (granduncle); Fruto Chamorro Pérez (half-granduncle)

Emiliano Chamorro Vargas (11 May 1871 – 26 February 1966) was a Nicaraguan military figure and politician who served as President of Nicaragua from 1 January 1917 to 1 January 1921. He was a member of the Conservative Party.

He lost the 1924 Nicaraguan general election. He launched a coup in 1925 against President Carlos José Solórzano. Chamorro was interim president from 14 March to 11 November 1926.

== Biography ==
=== Early political career ===
In 1909, Chamorro participated in a failed revolution to topple liberal President José Santos Zelaya. When Zelaya was finally removed in a 1909 coup led by Juan José Estrada, Chamorro became Chairman of the Constituent Assembly and leader of the country's Conservative Party.

As a reward for his assistance in defeating the revolt against President Adolfo Díaz, Chamorro was appointed Nicaragua's Minister to the United States. In 1914, he negotiated the Bryan–Chamorro Treaty with the United States, by which Nicaragua agreed to allow the construction of a canal across the country, linking the Caribbean with the Pacific Ocean (a canal that has not been constructed).

=== As President of Nicaragua ===
He returned to Nicaragua in 1916 and was elected president. His Conservative Party received U.S. assistance in attaining power, and Chamorro later partnered with the United States. During his term in office he made a concentrated effort to pay off the country's creditors. Running again for office in 1923, he was defeated by Carlos José Solórzano. In 1926, he led a successful coup to overthrow Solórzano, but his new government failed to win American support and faced a civil war. He eventually resigned in favor of Adolfo Díaz and left the country.

=== Later career ===
In the following years, Chamorro served as Nicaragua's minister to several European states. Originally opposed to the dictatorship of Anastasio Somoza García, he eventually reached a compromise in 1950 (The Pact of the Generals), whereby the Conservative Party was granted a number of seats in the Congress. This, however, cost him the support of many radical members of the Conservative Party.

== Genealogy ==
Emiliano Chamorro Vargas came from a very influential family in Nicaragua, both politically and economically.

His ancestors were:

- Diego Chamorro de Sotomayor y Murga b. 1711 Sevilla, Spain, d. 1785 Nicaragua and Gregoria Vargas Baez, She died on 28 March 1936, in Comalapa, Chontales, Nicaragua.
- Fernando Chamorro Lacayo b. 1751 Granada, Nicaragua d. 1793 Granada, Nicaragua and Bárbara Nicolasa Argüello del Castillo b. 1756 Granada, Nicaragua d. 1785 Granada, Nicaragua
- Pedro José Chamorro Argüello b. 29 December 1782 Granada, Nicaragua, d. 31 May 1824 Granada, army general, and Josefa Margarita Alfaro Jimenez-Monterroso b. 1794 Granada, Nicaragua, d. 1884 Granada, Nicaragua
  - Pedro José´s children included President Pedro Joaquín Chamorro Alfaro, President Fernando Chamorro Alfaro and President Frutos Chamorro Pérez
- Dionisio Chamorro Alfaro b. ABT 1817 Granada, Nicaragua, d. 3 July 1889 Granada, and Mercedes Antonia Oreamuno Abaunza b. 9 June 1834 Masaya, Nicaragua, d. 3 July 1889 Granada, Nicaragua
- Salvador Chamorro Oreamuno and Gregoria Vargas Báez b.. 1853 Juigalpa, Chontales, d. 1936 Juigalpa, Chontales

He was nephew of President Rosendo Chamorro Oreamuno, half-grandnephew of President Frutos Chamorro Pérez, nephew of President Diego Manuel Chamorro Bolaños and grandnephew of Presidents Fernando Chamorro Alfaro and Pedro Joaquín Chamorro Alfaro.

He was the only child of Salvador Chamorro Oreamuno and Gregoria Vargas Báez. His mother remarried to Evaristo de la Rosa Enríquez and had nine other children, half siblings of Emiliano. Evaristo Enríquez was brother to Emiliano´s father-in-law, Ceferino Enríquez.

Chamorro married Lastenia Enríquez Bermúdez, b. abt 1875 Comalapa, Chontales d. 7 April 1952 Managua, daughter of Ceferino Enríquez and Isabel Bermúdez. He later married Mercedes Rodríguez Urbina. He did not have children and left all his fortune to his nephews, both from the Chamorro and the Enriquez family.

== In popular culture ==
A portrait of Chamorro appears as a plot element in the novel Spalovač mrtvol by the Czech writer Ladislav Fuks, published in 1967. A film adaptation, directed by Juraj Herz, was filmed in 1968.

Political offices
Preceded by Adolfo Díaz	President of Nicaragua; 1917–1921	Succeeded by Diego Manuel Chamorro
Preceded by Carlos José Solórzano	President of Nicaragua; 1926	Succeeded by Sebastián Uriza
