= Minskoff =

Minskoff may refer to:

- Minskoff Theatre, Broadway theatre in New York City
- Dorothea Grater Minskoff (1910–1986), American lawyer
- Henry H. Minskoff (1911–1984), American real estate developer
