= MTV Studios =

MTV Studios may refer to:

- MTV Studios, the former name of the broadcast studios of Paramount Media Networks located in One Astor Plaza.
- MTV Entertainment Studios, formerly known as MTV Studios, the production division of MTV
