= Shubert Alley =

Pedestrian street in Manhattan, New York

Coordinates: 40°45′29.2″N 73°59′13.0″W

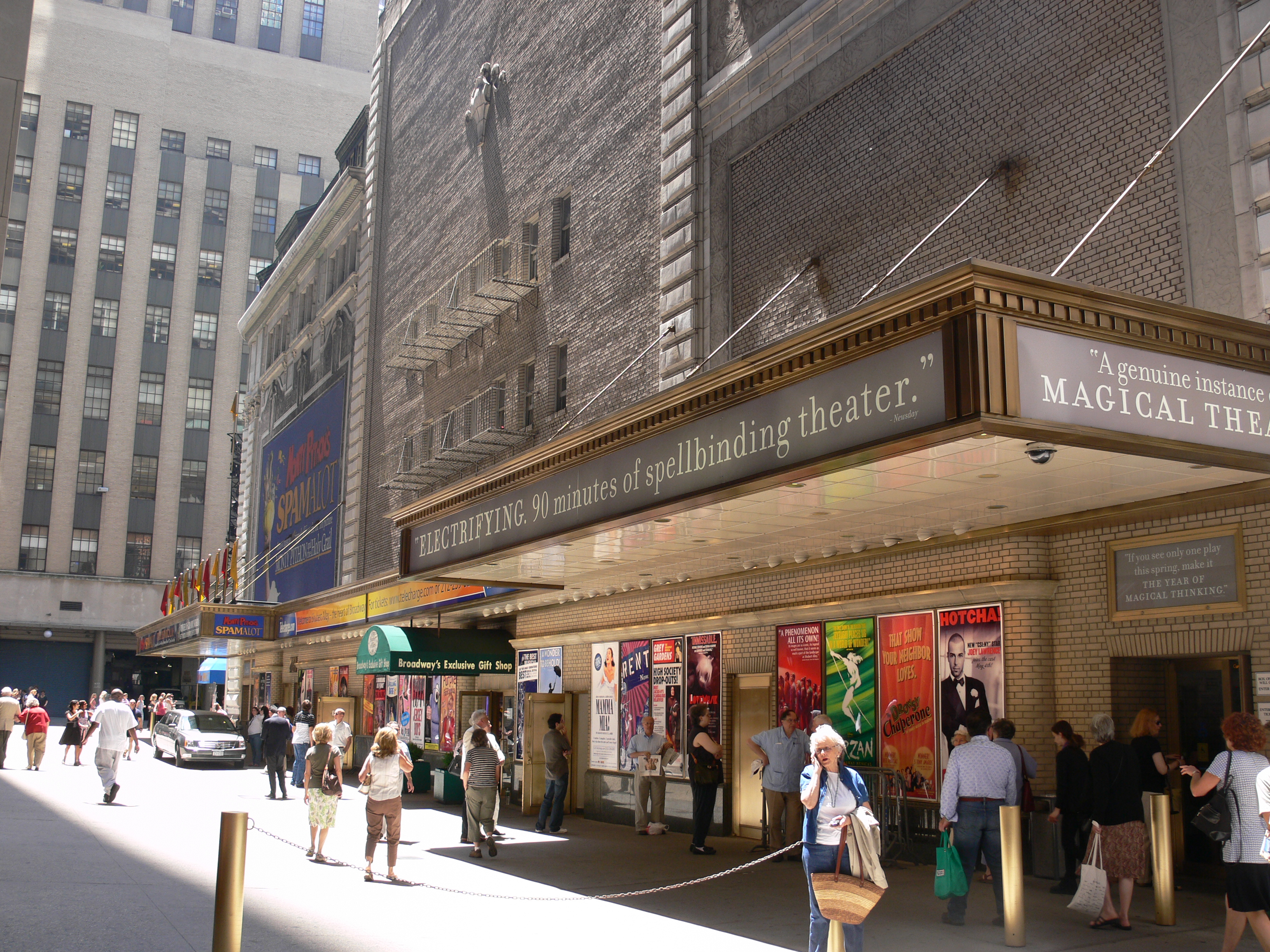
Shubert Alley, facing Shubert Theatre and Booth Theatre (2007)

Shubert Alley is a pedestrian alley in the Theater District of Midtown Manhattan in New York City. The alley, a privately owned public space, connects 44th and 45th Streets and covers about 6,400 square feet (590 m^{2}). It runs through the middle of a city block, parallel to Eighth Avenue to the west and Broadway to the east. The western half of the alley abuts the Shubert and Booth theaters, while the eastern half is adjacent to One Astor Plaza. Because it is near several major theaters, the alley has been considered the geographical center of Broadway theatre.

The alley was built along with the Shubert and Booth theaters in 1913. The Shubert family parked their cars in the alley, which was gated and locked at night. Actors would gather in the alley while waiting to try out for parts, lining up along the western wall. In the 1930s, the alley was fenced off and part of it was used as a bus terminal. The eastern half of the alley, which faced the Astor Hotel, was rebuilt when the hotel was demolished in 1967. A northward extension of Shubert Alley opened in the 1980s when the New York Marriott Marquis was built. The alley continues to serve as a theater fire exit and has also hosted several events during its history, including Broadway Cares/Equity Fights AIDS benefits and the annual Stars in the Alley concert.

== Description ==
Shubert Alley runs parallel to Eighth Avenue to the west and Broadway to the east, linking 44th Street to the south and 45th Street to the north. The western half of the alley abuts the Shubert and Booth theaters, while the eastern half is adjacent to One Astor Plaza. The eastern half of the alley originally faced the Astor Hotel, which was razed in 1967 when One Astor Plaza was built. A large chamber under the western half of the alley contained air-conditioning and mechanical systems for the seven theaters on the block: the Majestic, Broadhurst, Shubert, John Golden, Bernard B. Jacobs, Gerald Schoenfeld, and Booth. Though Shubert Alley is typically open to the public, it is a privately owned public space covering about 6,400 square feet (590 m^{2}). Ownership of the alley is split; The Shubert Organization owns the section to the west and the owners of One Astor Plaza own the section to the east. To retain their property rights and protect against adverse possession, the alley's owners jointly close the alley to the public for one day every year.

The alley was built along with the Shubert and Booth theaters in 1913 as a 15-foot-wide (4.6 m) walkway. At the time, fire laws required that there be room for equipment in an emergency. The alley not only allowed the theaters to meet fire regulations but also enabled the structures to be designed as corner lots, with curved corners facing the alley. Henry Beaumont Herts, the architect of the Shubert and Booth theaters, designed the Shubert Alley facades of both theaters with a full decorative scheme. This was a departure from typical theater designs of the time, in which the side facades were blank walls. There is also a plaque outside the Shubert Theatre's entrance at the corner of 44th Street and Shubert Alley, which contains the text "Dedicated to all those who glorify the theatre and use this short thoroughfare".

Brothers Lee and Jacob J. Shubert, who were the city's most powerful theater owners and producers in the 20th century, both had offices overlooking Shubert Alley. At the alley's northern end was a brownstone house, which until 1945 served as the residence of Frederick A. Muschenheim, the operator of the Hotel Astor. Before it was demolished around 1948, it was the only private house in the immediate area. Shubert Alley continues to serve as a theater fire exit and often is filled with audience members during show-times and intermissions. The alley has also served as a filming location, such as for Act One in 1963 and Mister Buddwing in 1966.

=== Events ===
Shubert Alley has hosted several events over its history. For instance, in 1960, the alley was used for a Coney Island-themed carnival. Broadway Cares/Equity Fights AIDS has held an Annual Flea Market and Grand Auction in Shubert Alley, selling props, costumes, and autographed memorabilia, almost every year since 1987. Starting in 1989, a free annual concert called Stars in the Alley has been held in Shubert Alley the week of the Tony Awards, featuring performances and celebrity guest appearances from current Broadway shows, to mark the official end of the Broadway season. Though Stars in the Alley was not held from 2008 to 2013, it returned in 2014. Broadway Barks, a charity event in which Broadway and other celebrities present shelter animals for adoption, has taken place annually in the alley since 1999.

=== Influence ===
The alley is often perceived in the Broadway theatrical industry as the center of Broadway theatre. Twelve theaters immediately surround it on 44th and 45th Streets, including eight on the same block. (Note: On the same block, the Majestic, Broadhurst, Shubert, Golden, Jacobs, Schoenfeld, and Booth are to the west and the Minskoff is in One Astor Plaza to the east. In addition, the Hayes and St. James are to the south and the Imperial and Music Box are to the north.) According to a 1942 New York Herald Tribune article, theatrical strategists would sometimes use pedestrian traffic, rather than box-office sales, as an indicator of whether Broadway theaters were successful. In 1948, a writer for The New York Times said that Shubert Alley was "the feverish heart of Broadway" and "a world of its own"; at the time, the most popular theaters were on 44th and 45th Streets. Theater scholar and professor Richard Hornby wrote in 1991: "In New York, the desirability of a theatre is inversely proportional to its distance from Shubert Alley."

Several media works and at least one venue have been named for Shubert Alley. It was reported in 1939 that the actor Raymond Massey built a bowling alley in his London home and called it Shubert Alley "to make it feel like little old New York". Toward the end of Lee Shubert's life, he planned to make a television show called Shubert Alley, but Lee died before it could be produced. A play entitled Shubert Alley was written by Mel Dinelli in 1943. In November 1959, a one-hour musical entitled Music from Shubert Alley was recorded in the alley and broadcast on TV. The next year, singer Mel Tormé released an album of show tunes entitled Mel Tormé Swings Shubert Alley, which was arranged by Marty Paich. An award for press agents, the Shubert Alley Memorial Trophy, was also issued during the 1940s.

== History ==
Times Square became the epicenter for large-scale theater productions between 1900 and the Great Depression. Manhattan's theater district had begun to shift from Union Square and Madison Square during the first decade of the 20th century. Before the theaters were built, the Times Square area had been largely residential, containing brownstone townhouses and some commercial tenants. Many Broadway theaters were built on side streets rather than on Broadway itself and, in the vicinity of Times Square, the Manhattan street grid was arranged in long city blocks between Broadway and Eighth Avenue. Since these side streets generally were not connected by midblock passageways, the first theaters were developed in a "series of unconnected clumps", as described by Christopher Gray of The New York Times.

=== Development ===
The first part of the alley was constructed in 1904, when the Hotel Astor was built with a small private driveway to its west. Plans for the current incarnation of the alley date to 1911, when theatrical producer Winthrop Ames was planning to build a replacement for the New Theatre. Though the New had been completed in 1909, Ames and the theater's founders saw the venue, on the Upper West Side, as being too large and too far away from Times Square. The New Theatre's founders acquired several buildings at 219–225 West 44th Street and 218–230 West 45th Street in March 1911 for the construction of a "new New Theatre" there. The theater would have contained a private alley to the east. The project was canceled in December 1911, after the site had been cleared, when Ames announced he would build the Little Theatre (now the Hayes Theater) across 44th Street.

In April 1912, Winthrop Ames and Lee Shubert decided to lease the site of the new New Theatre from the Astor family. Two theaters were planned for the site, along with a private alley to their east. Shubert's venue on 44th Street was named in memory of his late brother Sam S. Shubert, while Ames's venue on 45th Street was named after actor Edwin Booth. The entire site was owned by the Astor family at the time, but Shubert and Ames signed a long-term lease for the land under the theaters in 1912. The Shubert and Booth theaters both opened in 1913. At the time, there were just two other theaters on the surrounding blocks: the Little Theatre and the now-demolished Weber and Fields' Music Hall. The first use of the alley for its intended purpose occurred in 1914, when a minor fire forced patrons out of the Shubert Theatre. In its early years, the alley was relatively narrow since the Hotel Astor extended much further back into its land lot than the modern-day One Astor Plaza.

=== Early popularity ===
The Shubert/Booth alley was used during World War I for charitable and wartime fundraisers. These events often featured the casts of shows that were playing at the Shubert and Booth theaters. The Shubert brothers also parked their cars in the alley, which at the time was gated and locked at night. The alley became more prominent after additional theaters were completed on 44th and 45th Streets in the 1910s and 1920s. The Broadhurst and Plymouth (now Schoenfeld) theaters were built to the west in 1917, with a parallel private alley of their own. These were followed by the Music Box in 1921; the Imperial in 1923; the Martin Beck (now Al Hirschfeld) in 1924; and the Majestic, Masque (Golden), Royale (Jacobs), and Erlanger's (St. James) in 1927. Sardi's restaurant on 44th Street, across from Shubert Alley, became a popular meeting place in the Broadway theatrical community.

The first use of the name "Shubert Alley" for the Shubert/Booth passageway was in 1924, when the New York Sun reported that the Shuberts were considering "changing the name of Shubert Alley to Paradise Alley". The next year, Shubert Alley hosted what The New York Times dubbed "the first theatrical block party in Broadway's history": a series of competitions judged by Al Jolson. During the late 1920s and early 1930s, an old woman nicknamed "The Rose of Shubert Alley" or "Rosie of Shubert Alley" frequently sold goods within the alley.

In the 1930s, the alley was bisected by a metal fence. Large posters, named "three-sheets" because they were three times the size of the "one-sheet" lobby cards, were hung from the fence to advertise shows underway in nearby theaters. The two sides of the alley carried different names: the west side retained the name "Shubert Alley", while the east side was called "Astor Alley". On the Shubert side, the alley had gates at both ends, and Lee Shubert's private limousine was the only car allowed. Cast members at the Shubert and Booth theaters would relax there during their breaks. Actors would gather in the alley while waiting to try out for parts, lining up along the western wall. According to the New York Herald Tribune, producers without offices also met with performers in the alley. On the Astor side, there was a brick bus station at the northern end of the alley, serving a bus line to New Jersey.

Stylized clocks were installed at either end of the alley in 1948. The clocks, designed by Louis Gottlieb, used the letters of the phrase "Shubert Alley" in place of numerals for the hour marks. A wooden sign was also installed, with the text "In honor of all those who glorify the theater and who use this short thoroughfare, Shubert Alley". The Broadway Association installed a plaque honoring the Shubert brothers on the Shubert Theatre's eastern wall, facing Shubert Alley, in June 1949. By then, Shubert Alley was one of three private thoroughfares in the city that was not a dead end; the others were Rockefeller Plaza and Thomas Street.

=== Renovations ===
The Shuberts bought the site of the Broadhurst, Plymouth, Booth, and Shubert theaters from the Astors in 1948, including their half of Shubert Alley. As part of this sale, the Shuberts and the Astors agreed to jointly renovate Shubert Alley, the first major modification to the alley in its history. A brick annex to the east, containing a carpentry shop and fire escapes for the Hotel Astor, was demolished during July and August 1949. The brick annex was replaced by a rear entrance to the Hotel Astor, as well as stores on either end. Kenneth B. Norton designed the two-story-high stores with glass and tile facades. The fence between Shubert and Astor alleys was also demolished, and Shubert Alley was doubled in width from 15 to 30 feet (9.1 m). (Note: One source erroneously cited this as 20 feet (6.1 m)) The posters were moved to the side walls when the fence was removed, and the buses were relocated to Port Authority Bus Terminal. Actress Irene Dunne noted in 1950:

I got a shock when I found that Shubert Alley is now a smart lane of elegant small shops, instead of being the empty alley where there used to be only a couple of stage doors, parking space for producer Lee Shubert's elegant limousine, and a place where actors met to discuss which offices were casting a new show that day.

From October 1950 to May 1952, the United Nations operated an unofficial information center in Shubert Alley, staffed solely by women. The Shuberts allowed the UN to use the alley without paying rent. In 1959, a cooling plant was installed under the western half of Shubert Alley at a cost of $250,000, serving the Shuberts' seven theaters on the block. The cooling plant, at the time the largest of its kind, could hold 650 short tons (580 long tons; 590 t) of ice at any given time. Prior to the installation of the cooling plant, the seven theaters were cooled using 350-pound (160 kg) slabs of ice, on which the Shuberts spent $6,000 a week; the theaters had often gone dark during the summer because of a lack of air conditioning. The project also involved building a condenser atop the Shubert Theatre. A portable box office was opened in Shubert Alley in April 1963.

For Shubert Alley's 50th anniversary, the Shubert family embedded a plaque in a corner of the Shubert Theatre during a ceremony on October 2, 1963. At the celebration, actress Helen Hayes said the alley was "a place where an actor can strut after a successful opening, and the only place in all New York to avoid after a bad one." Sam Minskoff and Sons paid $10.5 million for the Hotel Astor and the eastern section of Shubert Alley in 1966. The eastern half of the alley was temporarily fenced off the next year, during the demolition of the hotel, to make way for One Astor Plaza. The Shubert and Booth theaters' eastern facades were temporarily visible from Broadway for the first time since the theaters were completed. One of the Minskoffs' preliminary plans for One Astor Plaza called for widening Shubert Alley by 1 foot (0.30 m), as well as constructing a staircase that connected to an elevated pedestrian plaza around One Astor Plaza. There was also a proposal to cover Shubert Alley with a glass canopy, but it was not executed.

=== Late 20th century to present ===
After One Astor Plaza was completed, a northward extension of the alley was proposed in 1969 as part of what would become the New York Marriott Marquis hotel between 45th and 46th Street. However, the developers of what became the Marquis were unable to acquire the Piccadilly Hotel, thus also blocking the extension. The next year, the New York City Planning Commission proposed that the alley be lengthened further northward to 53rd Street. When the Marriott Marquis was completed in 1985, its passageway functioned as a northward extension of Shubert Alley. Unlike the original alley, the Marquis extension is completely beneath that hotel.

Two bronze markers measuring 12 by 18 inches (300 by 460 mm) were embedded in the alley's sidewalk in March 1973. Executives with both the Shubert Organization and Minskoff & Sons continued to park in the alley. In 1977, Maggie Minskoff tried to prevent producer Alexander H. Cohen, who worked in the Shubert Theatre, from parking there because of a personal dispute; the argument continued for several months and nearly led to a lawsuit. A gift shop called One Shubert Alley opened between the Shubert and Booth theaters in 1979, within three of the Booth's former dressing rooms. Numerous annual events were hosted in the alley starting in the 1980s. By the late 1990s, Times Square was seeing high amounts of pedestrian traffic, but relatively few pedestrians used Shubert Alley as an alternative route.

During the 2000s, Shubert Organization president Gerald Schoenfeld also parked his car in the alley, leading mayor Michael Bloomberg to observe that Schoenfeld had the "best parking spot in New York City". On March 22, 2006, to mark the first anniversary of the official Broadway opening of the musical comedy Spamalot, the "World's Largest Coconut Orchestra" (1,789 people clapping half-coconut shells together) performed in Shubert Alley. The event was officially recognized by the Guinness Book of World Records. The alley was closed temporarily in 2019 due to falling debris, prompting a renovation that displaced the 2019 Broadway Barks event. As a result of the COVID-19 pandemic in New York City, two annual events in Shubert Alley were moved online: the Broadway Cares flea market in 2020 and Broadway Barks in 2020 and 2021.
