= Broadway Barks =

American annual animal charity event

Broadway Barks is an annual animal charity event held in New York City to promote the adoption of shelter animals. Founded by Bernadette Peters and Mary Tyler Moore, the event has been held every July in Shubert Alley, starting in 1999. Performers, many from Broadway shows, present adoptable cats and dogs, with the participation of many animal groups from the New York City area.

== Background ==
The event was founded in 1999 by Bernadette Peters with Mary Tyler Moore and others, who wanted to do "something for the animals" after a successful fund–raising campaign for Broadway Cares/Equity Fights AIDS. Performers, many appearing in Broadway shows, and other celebrities present cats and dogs from New York City and vicinity animal shelters for adoption.

Peters received a special Tony Award in 2012, the Isabelle Stevenson Award for her work with Broadway Barks. On August 21, 2012, Peters and Moore received a dedicated "Ride of Fame" bus on Gray Line New York. This honor "recognizes and honors leading New Yorkers and iconic New York establishments, whom they [Gray Line] identify as 'exemplary community figures and entities by bestowing a bus in their fleet to each dedicatee.' " The bus has a "custom decal" with Moore and Peters' likenesses as well as a Broadway Barks logo.

== The Adopt-a-thon ==
The event has been held every July since 1999 in Shubert Alley, in the Broadway Theater District. The first adopt–a–thon was held on July 24, 1999, and benefitted five animal welfare shelters and groups: the ASPCA, Center for Animal Care & Control (CACC), Bide-a-Wee, Humane Society and North Shore Animal League. Performers including Tom Wopat, Joel Grey, Andrea McArdle, and Edie Falco participated. During the July 2007 event, more than 100 pets were adopted, and New York City Mayor Michael Bloomberg issued a proclamation making July 14, 2007 "Broadway Barks Day" in New York City.

Broadway Barks has grown over the years until, by Broadway Barks 10 held on July 12, 2008, it benefitted some 25 animal adoption and welfare groups, with presenters who included Glenn Close, Phyllis Newman, Mario Lopez, and Nathan Lane introducing the adoptable animals. Broadway Barks 11 was held on July 11, 2009, with the participation of and to benefit 26 animal adoption and welfare groups, including the ASPCA, BARC, and Long Island Greyhound Rescue. Many celebrity presenters attended, including Elizabeth Ashley, Michael Cerveris, David Hyde Pierce, Audra McDonald and Michael Urie.

Broadway Barks 12 was held on July 10, 2010, and included the animal adoption and welfare groups ASPCA, BARC, Humane Society of New York and the North Shore Animal League. Among the celebrity participants were John Dossett, Alexander Hanson, Sean Hayes, Jackie Hoffman, Karen Olivo, Katie Finneran, Tony Goldwyn, Ruthie Henshall, Hunter Ryan Herdlicka, Beth Leavel, Judy McLane, Jan Maxwell, Tony Shalhoub and Richard Thomas. In honor of the event, the lights of the Empire State Building were lit in pink, purple and yellow.

Broadway Barks 13 was held on July 9, 2011. Performers from many of the Broadway shows presented the adoptable animals: Nina Arianda and Michael McGrath (Born Yesterday); Heidi Blickenstaff, Jackie Hoffman, Bebe Neuwirth and Brad Oscar (The Addams Family); Steel Burkhardt, Matt DeAngelis, Josh Lamon, Paris Remillard and Kacie Sheik (Hair); Kerry Butler, Linda Hart and Aaron Tveit (Catch Me If You Can); Bobby Cannavale, Elizabeth Rodriguez and Yul Vázquez (The Motherf**ker With the Hat); Reeve Carney, T.V. Carpio, Jennifer Damiano, Isabel Keating and Patrick Page (Spider-Man: Turn Off the Dark), Victoria Clark and Patina Miller (Sister Act), Paige Davis (Boeing-Boeing), Sutton Foster, Adam Godley, Joel Grey and John McMartin (Anything Goes), John Benjamin Hickey (The Normal Heart), Nikki M. James, Rory O'Malley and Andrew Rannells (The Book of Mormon), Beth Leavel (Baby It's You), Judy McLane (Mamma Mia!), Will Swenson (Priscilla Queen of the Desert) and William Berloni, "trainer to Broadway’s four-legged stars and behavior consultant for the Humane Society of New York."

Broadway Barks 14 was held on July 14, 2012. In addition to the celebrity presentation of adoptable cats and dogs, Peters autographed a new Broadway Barks calendar. To acknowledge the event, Peters rang the NASDAQ closing bell on July 13, 2012.

There were some 27 animal shelters and adoption agencies that participated, including the ASPCA, Mid Atlantic Great Dane, and Urban Cat League. Broadway and television performers presented the adoptable animals, such as Nina Arianda, Joel Grey, Megan Hilty, Anjelica Huston, Steve Kazee, Audra McDonald, Bebe Neuwirth and Ben Vereen. Neuwirth jokingly remarked (in a newspaper article) "I’m the designated crazy cat lady." She has been at Broadway Barks every year to "help showcase the many cats available for adoption."

Broadway Barks 15 was held on July 13, 2013. Peters and Harvey Fierstein (substituting for Moore, who could not attend) co-hosted. David Hyde Pierce, Sigourney Weaver, Andrew Rannells, Jane Lynch, Billy Porter and others presented the adoptable animals. Among the 27 shelters represented were Bobbi and the Strays, City Critters, The Humane Society of New York, Husky House, KittyKind, Loving Touch Animal Center, Manhattan Valley Cat Rescue, Metropolitan Maltese Rescue, Mid-Atlantic Great Dane Rescue League, NY Pet-I-Care, Pet ResQ, P.L.U.T.O. Rescue (Pet Lovers United Together as One), Russell Refuge, SaveKitty Foundation, Sean Casey Animal Rescue, Stray from the Heart, Tigger Foundation and Urban Cat League.

Broadway Barks 16 was held on July 12, 2014, with hosts Peters and James Franco. Presenters included performers from many shows on Broadway appeared, including Bullets Over Broadway, Matilda The Musical, A Gentleman’s Guide to Love and Murder, Cinderella, Hedwig and the Angry Inch, Aladdin, Rocky and Of Mice and Men (and many more). Performers included Zach Braff, Bebe Neuwirth, Marin Mazzie, Audra McDonald, Will Swenson, and Danny Burstein.

Broadway Barks 17 was held on July 11, 2015, in Shubert Alley, with Peters as host and special guest host Andrew Rannells. Many shelters participated, including ASPCA, Adopt a Boxer Rescue, Animal Care and Control of NYC (AC&C), Animal Haven, Anjellicle Cat Rescue, BARC (Brooklyn Animal Resource Coalition), Bideawee, Bobbi & the Strays, Humane Society of New York (HSNY), Manhattan Valley Cat Rescue, Metropolitan Maltese Rescue, Mid-Atlantic Great Dane Rescue, P.L.U.T.O. Rescue (Pet Lovers United Together As One), Sean Casey Animal Rescue, Stray from the Heart, Tigger Foundation and Urban Cat League. Presenters included Sierra Boggess, Christian Borle and the cast from Something Rotten, and Michael Cerveris and the cast from Fun Home.

Broadway Barks 18 was held on July 30, 2016, with Gloria Estefan as guest co-host with Peters. Performers from most of the shows on Broadway presented the adoptable cats and dogs, from Beautiful and The Humans to Waitress and Wicked, and included perennial presenter Bebe Neuwirth.

Broadway Barks 19 was held on July 8, 2017, with Peters joined by Malcolm McDowell as her guest co-host. To honor co-founder, the late Mary Tyler Moore, a special award was announced: The Mary Tyler Moore Award, given initially in July 2017 to Sophie Gamand, a French photographer and animal advocate. Broadway Barks 20 was held on July 14, 2018, with Peters joined by Victor Garber as her guest co-host. The Barks adoptathon was cancelled for 2019 due to construction in Shubert Alley. (Peters made the announcement in an amusing video, aided by Laurie Metcalf and Santino Fontana.)

Broadway Barks was held virtually via the internet on May 23, 2021, hosted by Peters. The presentation featured many performers such as Carol Burnett, Gloria Estafan, Kelly Ripa and Mary Steenburgen and Ted Danson The many animal shelters included ASPCA and Urban Cat League. The event was produced by Broadway Cares/Equity Fights AIDS and Paul Wontorek. In 2022, Broadway Barks returned for its first in-person event since the COVID-19 pandemic began, with many Broadway stars in attendance and many shelter organizations participating. Activists protesting against the Humane Society of New York, one of the shelter organizations represented at the event, briefly interrupted Peters's speech there.

== Benefits ==
=== Special benefit concert (2009) ===
Peters held a one-time-only concert, "A Special Concert for Broadway Barks Because Broadway Cares", at the Minskoff Theatre, New York City, on November 9, 2009, as a benefit for both Broadway Barks and Broadway Cares/Equity Fights Aids. The concert raised an estimated $615,000 for the two charities.

=== Film ===
Alan Cumming wrote and directed a short film Ultimate Encore in 2015, which shows the newly renovated "Living Room" at the hotel W New York, in Times Square. The film raises funds and awareness for Broadway Barks. Cumming said: "...to be able to make a film that both celebrates the elevated version of Times Square that the newly renovated Living Room at W New York – Times Square represents and highlights the great pet adoption work of Broadway Barks was the perfect combo."

=== Others ===
Daniel Reichard gave two concerts at Birdland on December 13 and 20, 2015, "Daniel Reichard's Under the Mistletoe!", to benefit Broadway Barks. Reichard said: "Having happily participated at the Broadway Barks adoption event in the past, I am so proud to further support this important organization. My dog has changed my life for the better."

Tim Realbuto presented a concert "Tim Realbuto Is Inappropriate" at Birdland in New York on February 8, 2016, with a portion of the proceeds donated to Broadway Barks.

== Books and songs ==
Broadway Barks

To promote the charity, Peters wrote a children's picture book, Broadway Barks, with mixed-media collage illustrations by Liz Murphy. The book was released in 2008 by Blue Apple Books and is designed for ages four through eight. It reached #5 on The New York Times Bestseller List for Children's Picture Books for the week of June 8, 2008. It tells the story of Douglas, an abandoned dog, as he follows a "pretty lady" (whose looks are similar to Peters) to a Broadway Barks pet adoption event in Shubert Alley in New York City. He takes his turn singing, but people laugh at him, hearing only barking. A girl named Isabelle understands that he is performing and adopts him, renaming him "Kramer."

The book is accompanied by a CD, which has the story and a lullaby being read and sung by Peters herself. The lullaby, "Kramer's Song", has music and lyrics written by Peters. Additionally, Kramer has a plush toy dog named after him; proceeds from sales of the toy go to the Broadway Barks charity.

The mixed-breed dog named Kramer, who Peters adopted from a shelter, and her goddaughter Isabelle were the inspirations for the characters in the book. The interactive book app for iPad was published, based on the book.

Stella is a Star

Peters has written a second children's book named after her other dog, Stella, titled Stella is a Star, with illustrations again by Liz Murphy and including a CD with an original song, "Stella's Song," written and performed by Peters. Stella is a pit bull who would rather be a pig ballerina, but learns to accept herself. It was released in April 2010 by Blue Apple Books, with proceeds going to the Broadway Barks charity. The CD also contains Peters' narration of the book. Peters introduced the book with a reading (and also singing the song for Stella) at the L.A. Times Festival of Books, Los Angeles, California, on April 24, 2010. She also participated in New York City's Learning Leaders Great School Volunteer Week by reading the book to pupils at a local New York City school in May 2010.

Stella and Charlie Friends Forever

Her third children's book, Stella and Charlie Friends Forever, tells the story of the shelter dog Charlie coming to live with adopted shelter dog Stella and their "mom", resulting in jealousy on Stella's part and the ultimate friendship that develops. Illustrations are by Liz Murphy. Peters introduced the book at a book signing on June 23, 2015, in New York City. The book was released in August 2015.
