= Palladium Times Square =

Event venue in Manhattan, New York

Coordinates: 40°45′28″N 73°59′11″W

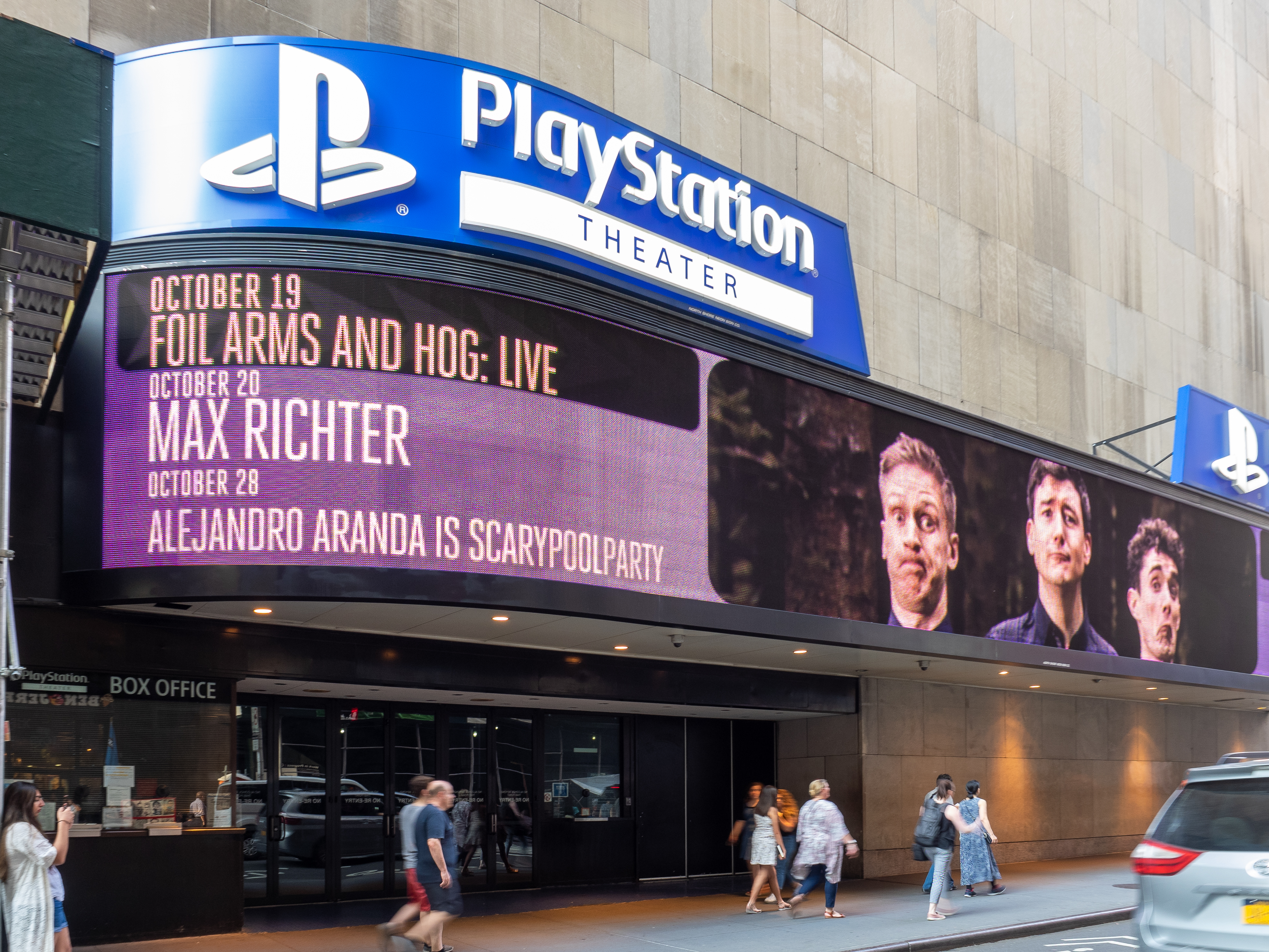
- Exterior of the venue when it was PlayStation Theater
- Interactive map of Palladium Times Square
- Former names: Nokia Theatre Times Square (2005–10); Best Buy Theater (2010–15); PlayStation Theater (2015–19)
- Address: 1515 Broadway; New York City, NY; United States
- Location: Times Square, Manhattan
- Capacity: 1,800 (2005–2020); 2,150 (2020–present)
- Type: Concert theater
- Public transit: New York City Subway: at Times Square–42nd Street; NYCT Bus: M7, M20, M34A SBS, M42, M104; Port Authority Bus Terminal

Construction
- Opened: June 26, 1974 (52 years ago) (as movie theatre)
- Rebuilt: October 1, 2005 (as live performance venue)
- Cost: $21 million

Website
- palladiumtimessquare.com

Palladium Times Square (formerly PlayStation Theater, Best Buy Theater and Nokia Theatre Times Square) is an indoor live events venue in New York City, located in One Astor Plaza, at the corner of Broadway and 44th Street. It was designed by architect David Rockwell and opened in September 2005. The venue has a large standing room orchestra section, combined with a large area of seating towards the rear of the auditorium.

The venue was originally built as the Loews Astor Plaza Theatre, a movie theater operated by Loews Theatres, which opened in 1974 and closed in August 2004. The space was leased by the Anschutz Entertainment Group (AEG), who converted it to a live-event venue at an estimated total cost of $21 million.

Due to the expiration of its lease, the PlayStation Theater closed on December 31, 2019, after a set of shows by Philadelphia trance fusion band Disco Biscuits. The venue reopened in 2020 as Palladium Times Square.

== Features ==
With a capacity of 2,100, the theater features an 85-foot-long (26 m) LED screen that is one of the largest marquees on Broadway. The venue is also capable of presenting live footage from the stage or anywhere else in the theater. The theater's marquee sign was directly connected to MTV Studios and allowed for live footage from there to be displayed.

The building also includes two private mezzanines, several dressing rooms, and a green room for up to 30 people. The theater hosts concerts, event parties, live television, web broadcasts, and award shows, including the Heisman Trophy ceremony, which took place at the theater from 2005 to 2019.

== Gallery ==
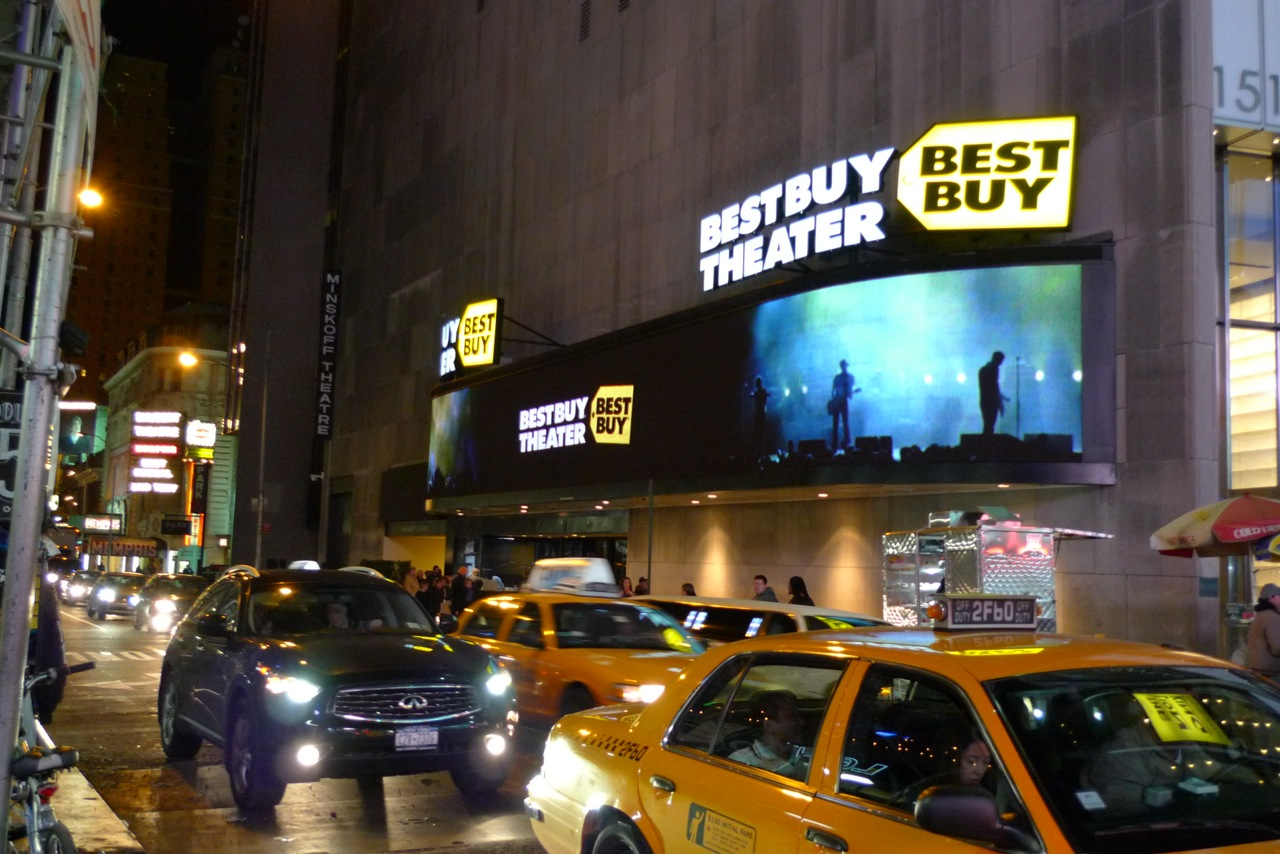
Exterior of the venue when it was Best Buy Theater

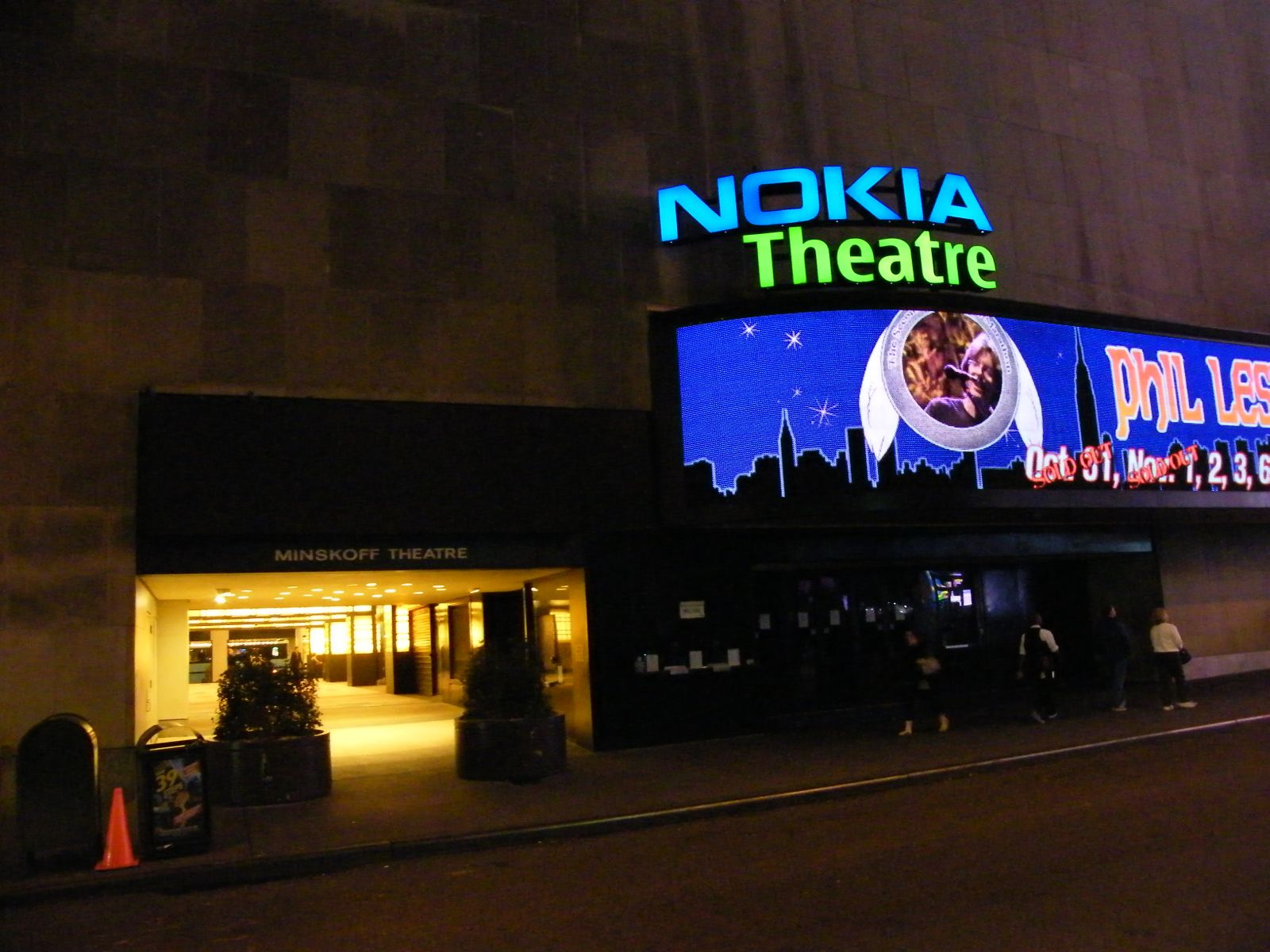
Exterior of the venue when it was Nokia Theatre Times Square
