= Hotel Astor =

Former hotel in Manhattan, New York

Coordinates: 40.757778°N 73.986389°W

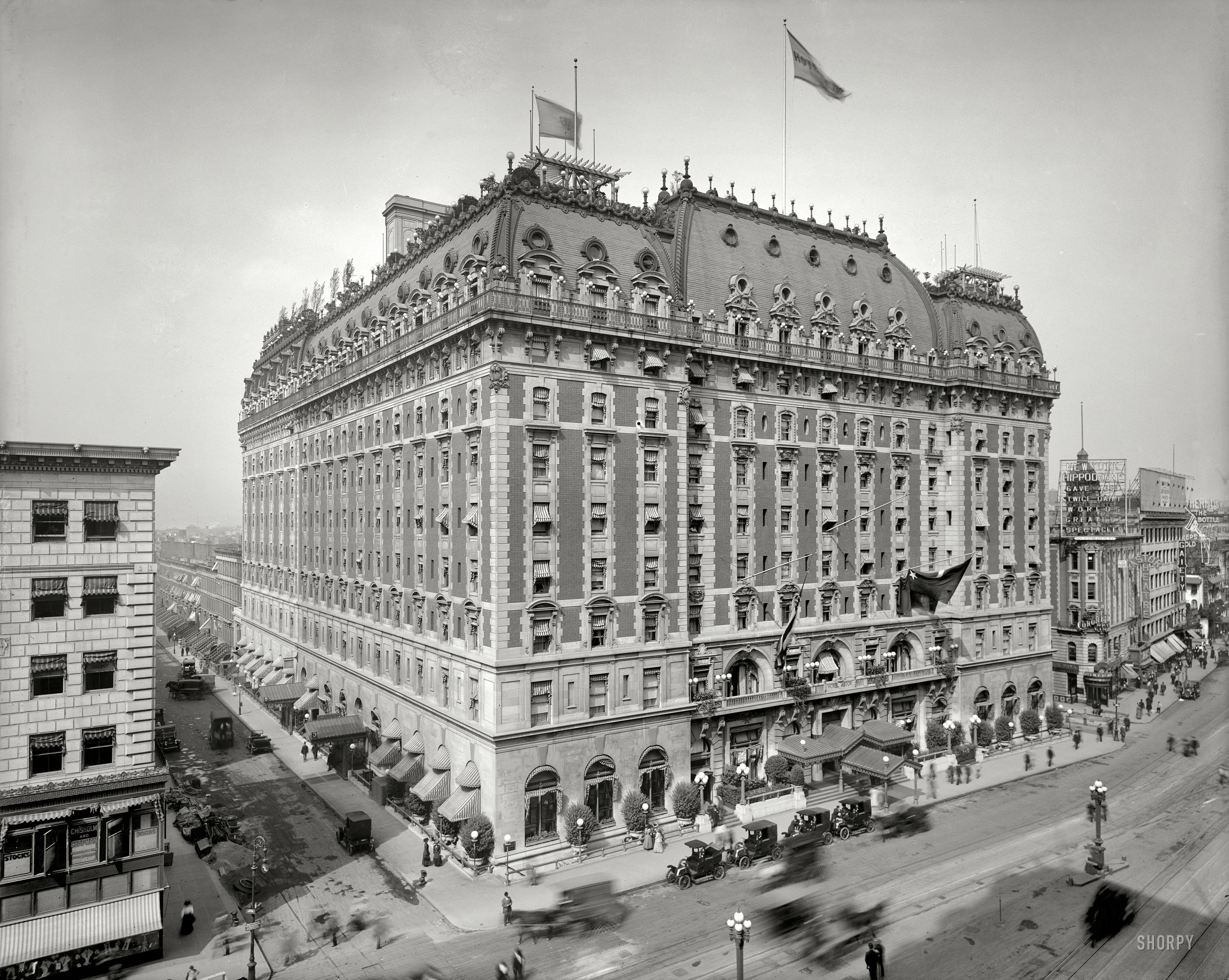
- Hotel Astor in 1909
- Interactive map of the Hotel Astor area

General information
- Architectural style: Beaux-Arts
- Location: Manhattan, New York City, New York, U.S.
- Construction started: 1904
- Completed: 1910
- Renovated: 1935 and 1949
- Demolished: 1967

Hotel Astor was a hotel on Times Square in the Midtown Manhattan neighborhood of New York City, New York, U.S. Built in 1905 and expanded in 1909–1910 for the Astor family, the hotel occupied a site bounded by Broadway, Shubert Alley, and 44th and 45th Streets. Architects Clinton & Russell designed the hotel as an 11-story Beaux-Arts edifice with a mansard roof. It contained 1,000 guest rooms, with two more levels underground for its extensive "backstage" functions, such as the wine cellar.

The hotel was developed as a successor to the Waldorf-Astoria. Hotel Astor's success triggered the construction of the nearby Knickerbocker Hotel by other members of the Astor family two years later. The building was razed in 1967 to make way for the high-rise office tower One Astor Plaza.

== Construction ==
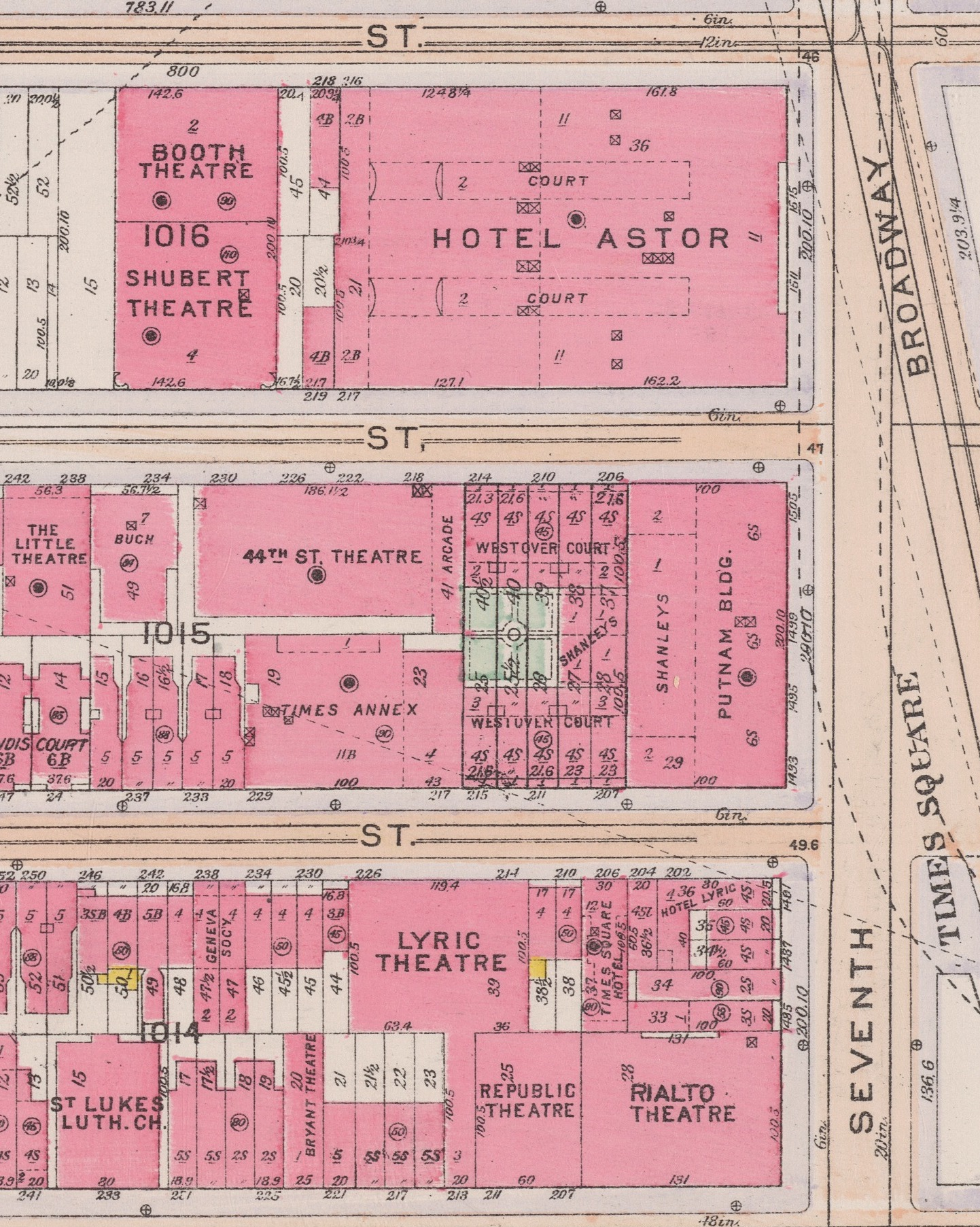
Times Square map in 1916 with Hotel Astor and nearby theaters

With its elaborately decorated public rooms and its roof garden, the Hotel Astor was perceived as the successor to the Astor family's Waldorf-Astoria on 34th Street. William C. Muschenheim and his brother, Frederick A. Muschenheim, conceived plans for the grand hotel in 1900. The area was then known as Longacre Square and stood beyond the fringe of metropolitan life, the center of New York's carriage-building trade. The Muschenheim brothers became the proprietors for absentee landlord William Waldorf Astor, from whom they leased the land. The hotel opened on September 9, 1904.

The 35,000 square feet (3,300 m^{2}) Hotel Astor was built in two stages, in 1905 and 1909–1910, by the same architects in the same style. Upon completion, the structure occupied an entire city block at a reported total cost of $7 million. Architects Clinton & Russell had designed a number of Astor commissions; here they developed a very Parisian Beaux-Arts style.

The Astor was an important element in the growth of Times Square and its character as an entertainment center. In 1904, New York Times publisher Adolph S. Ochs moved his newspaper's operations to a new tower on 42nd Street in the middle of Longacre Square (later One Times Square). Ochs persuaded Mayor George B. McClellan Jr. to build a subway station there and rename it Times Square. The Theater District would soon occupy magnificent new auditoriums along Forty-second Street, and electric lighting transformed this strip of Broadway into the "Great White Way".

Hotel Astor's success triggered the construction of the nearby Knickerbocker Hotel by other members of the Astor family two years later, although that property became commercial office space within a few years. The Astor set the pattern for "a new species of popular hotels that soon clustered around Times Square, vast amusement palaces that catered to crowds with scenographic interiors that mirrored the theatricality of the Great White Way."

== Amenities ==
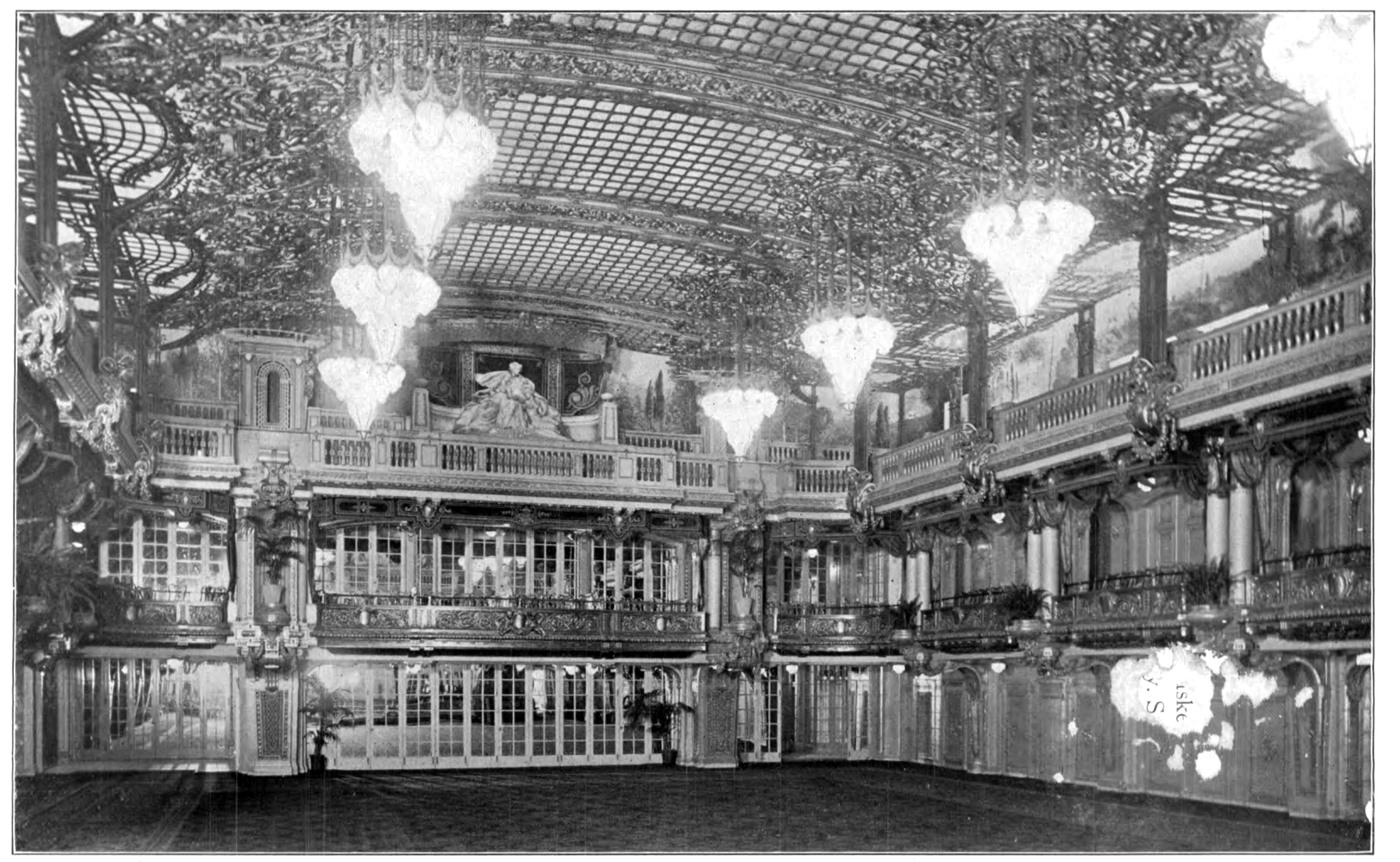
Southern end of the Grand Ballroom, circa 1910

Within its restrained exterior, the Astor featured a long list of elaborately themed ballrooms and exotic restaurants: the Old New York lobby, the American Indian Grill Room decorated with artifacts collected with the help of the American Museum of Natural History, a Flemish smoking room, a Pompeiian billiard room, the Hunt Room decorated in sixteenth century German Renaissance style, and many other features.

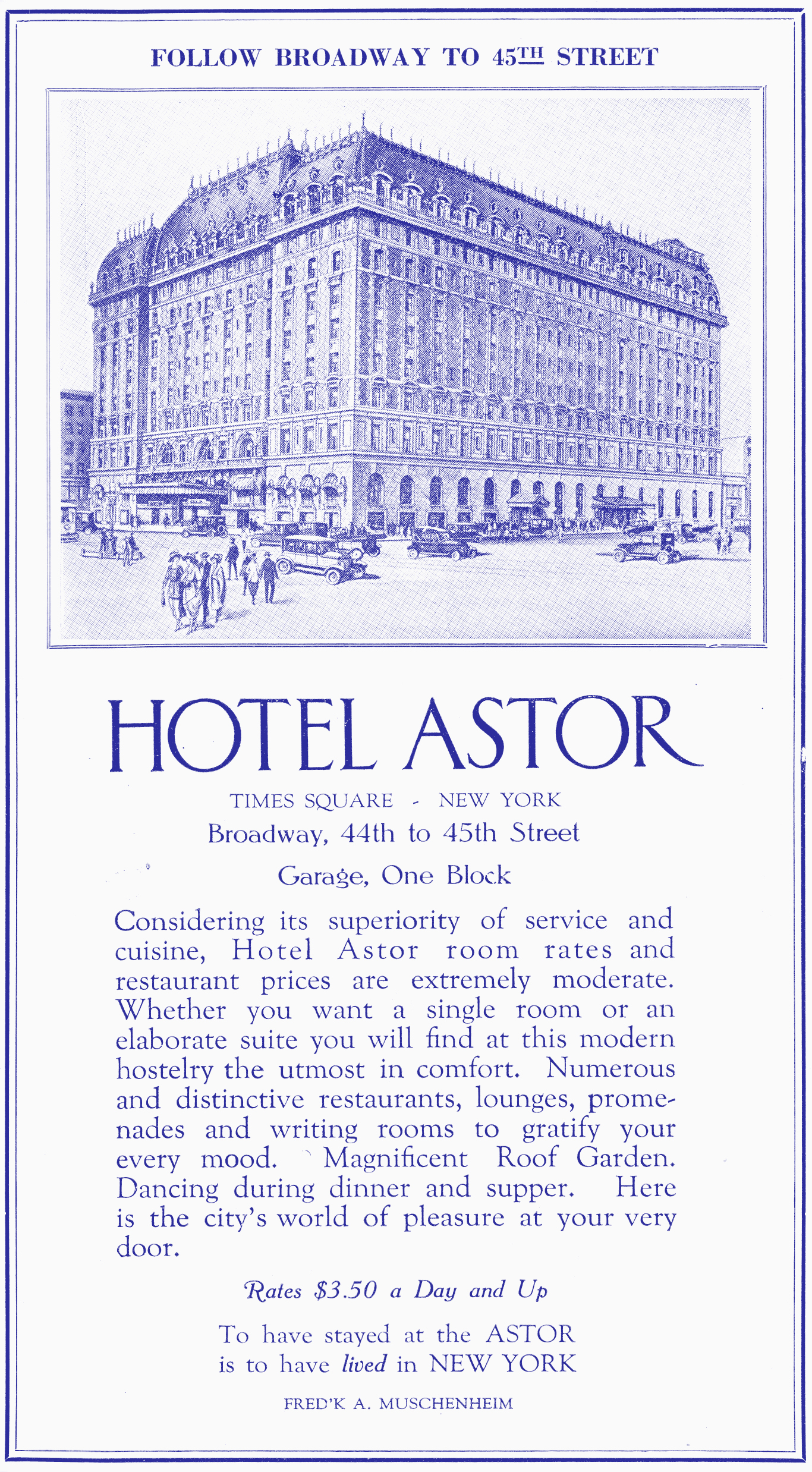
1922 ad for the Hotel Astor

The Large Ballroom (or Banquet Hall), on the ninth floor, opened on September 29, 1909 with a dinner that was part of the Hudson-Fulton Celebration. Measuring 50 by 85 feet (15 m × 26 m), the Banquet Hall was decorated in the Rococo style of Louis XV and featured a high-groined arch ceiling in ivory white and old gold, supported by grouped caryatids. A gallery spanned the south and west sides, affording a fine view of the room, which could accommodate 500 diners. A large Austin pipe organ was installed; in 1910 Leo B. Riggs was appointed organist and gave daily concerts for the hotel's guests. The organ's manuals included an integrated piano.

The smaller ballroom, seating 250, was decorated in the neoclassical Louis XVI manner and could be joined with the larger ballroom. Still another adjoining room, "The College Hall", could also open to the ballroom so that the combined rooms could seat up 1,100 persons. The Palm Garden, or "L'Orangerie", located in the rear of the first floor lobby, was intended to represent an Italian garden. Its ceiling, painted to represent a Mediterranean sky, was partly concealed by feigned vine-covered pergolas. Blue lighting, hanging lamps draped in vines, swaying fern baskets, and scenic pictures of the out-of-doors further enhanced the perception.

The rooftop garden, with bandstand and observatory, was one of a number constructed in the city between 1880 and Prohibition, among them the American Theater on Eighth Avenue, the garden atop Stanford White's 1890 Madison Square Garden, and the Paradise Roof Garden opened by Oscar Hammerstein I in 1900. In later years, the noted landscape architect Takeo Shiota redesigned the roof's North Garden on a Japanese theme.

Artwork in the original lobby included four murals by William de Leftwich Dodge depicting Ancient and Modern New York. The ballroom held a marble group called the Three Graces, by sculptor Isidore Konti, with all three figures modeled on Audrey Munson, along with murals by designer Edward G. Unitt.

== Social history ==
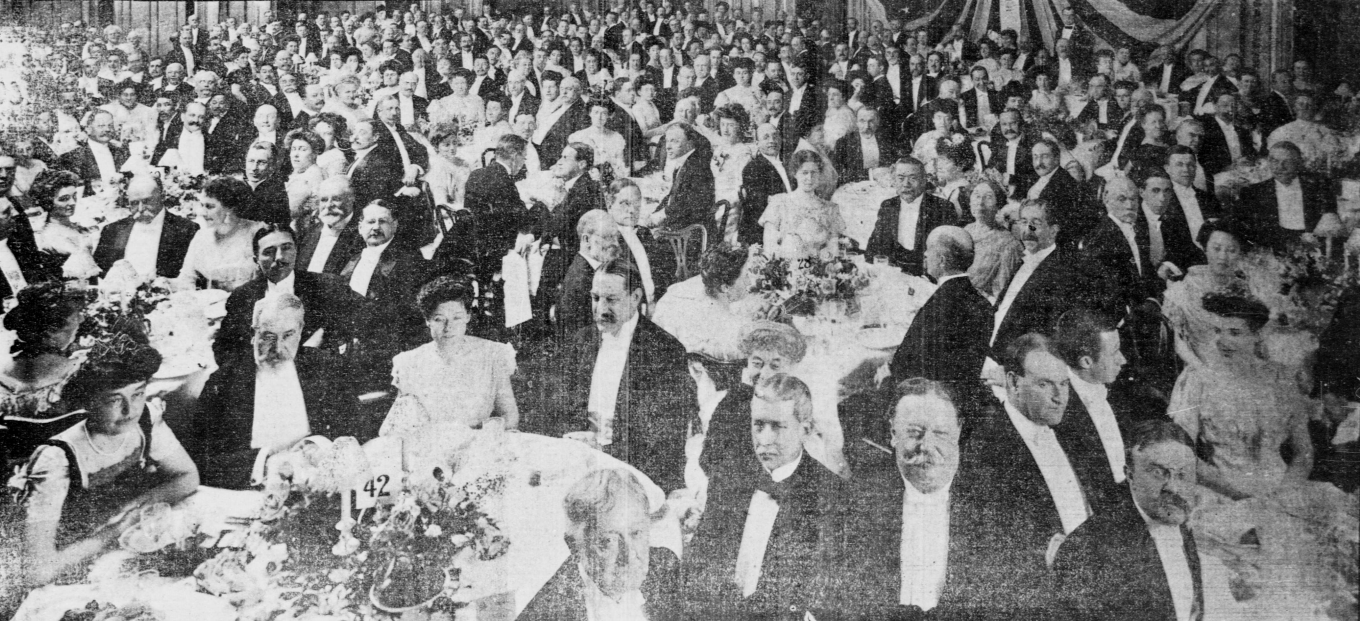
Peace Society dinner at the Hotel Astor, February 1909 with President Taft and Secretary of State Elihu Root in lower right

As a popular meeting place and New York City landmark, the Astor had a place in popular culture for decades, from the extended double entendre song "She Had to Go and Lose It at the Astor", to its appearance in the 1945 film The Clock, which provides a good view of the wartime-era lobby (although reconstructed in Hollywood). The first notable regular dance band at the Astor was that of Fred Rich, who made many records for Columbia Records and its budget subsidiary Harmony Records in the 1920s as "Fred Rich and his Hotel Astor Orchestra" and also as "The Astorites." Among many other later musicians, the swing era bandleader Tommy Dorsey appeared regularly on the rooftop bandstand, and it was there that Frank Sinatra made early New York appearances with Dorsey's band from 1940 to 1942. Another regular, in the 1950s, was Carmen Cavallaro and his orchestra, advertised on the marquee under the banner "On the Astor Roof". In 1933, it was the site of Fiorello La Guardia's election night party when he was first elected mayor of New York.

In 1947, stuntman John Ciampa scaled the exterior of the hotel as part of a publicity ploy for the Sunbrock Rodeo and Thrill Circus. A 1947 post card, Hotel Astor claimed "1000 rooms, 1000 baths" and as "The Crossroads of the World"

Beginning in the 1910s, the Astor Bar acquired a reputation as a gay meeting place. During World War II, the Astor Bar was one of three American hotel bars "world famous for their wartime ambience", alongside the Top of the Mark at the Mark Hopkins Hotel in San Francisco, and the men's bar at the Los Angeles Biltmore. Unlike the flamboyant late-night scenes at the automats, gay patrons at the Astor Bar were welcomed, allotted an entire side of the oval bar, and expected to be discreet (by the standards of the time). Thus "the Astor maintained its public reputation as an eminently respectable Times Square rendezvous, while its reputation as a gay rendezvous and pickup bar assumed legendary proportions." The bar was further immortalized in Cole Porter's song "Well, Did You Evah!", which includes the line, "Have you heard that Mimsie Starr / Just got pinched in the Astor Bar?" The ribald tune "She Had to Go and Lose It at the Astor" explored a similar theme.

Ian Fleming chose the Astor as James Bond's hotel of choice in 1960s New York, favoured for maintaining standards, when other great hotels had fallen, and for its location in a quintessential American neighbourhood. "The Astor. It was as good as another and Bond liked the Times Square jungle — the hideous souvenir shops, the sharp clothiers, the giant feedomats, the hypnotic neon signs, one of which said BOND in letters a mile high."

== Later years ==
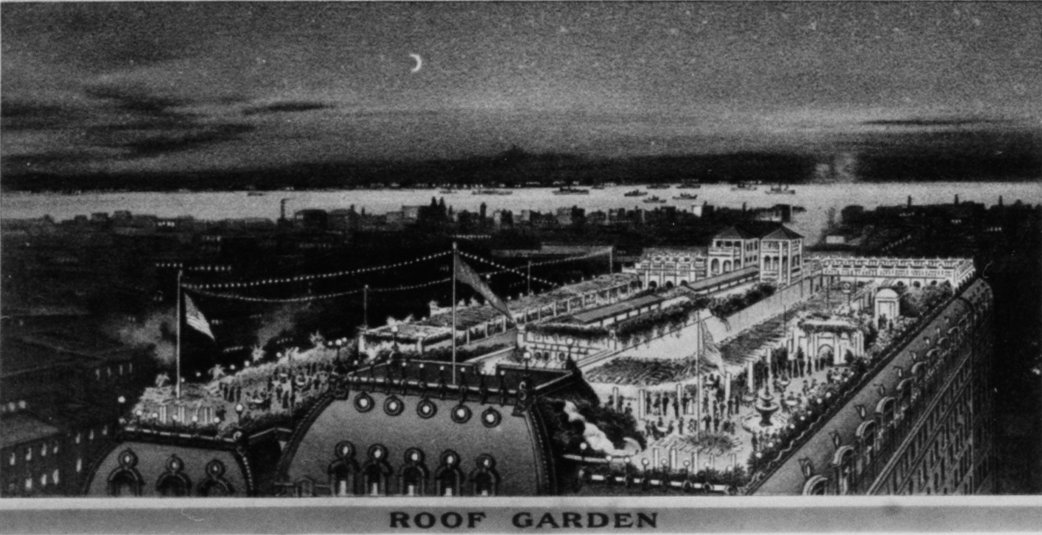
Rendering of the Astor's rooftop garden

The hotel was completely renovated in 1935, and again in 1949. It was sold to real estate entrepreneur William Zeckendorf on September 1, 1954. However he sold it again just two weeks later, on September 15, 1954, to Sheraton Hotels, which renamed it the Sheraton-Astor. Zeckendorf repurchased the hotel in December 1957, regaining control of it in March 1958 and returning it to its original name. During this period, the hotel was managed by Prince Serge Obolensky. As an indirect result of Zeckendorf's 1965 bankruptcy, the Astor was sold for $10.5 million in 1966. It closed and was demolished in 1967 by Sam Minskoff & Sons. After several years of delays, the hotel was replaced by One Astor Plaza, a 50-story skyscraper completed in 1972 and designed by Der Scutt.

== See also ==
- List of former hotels in Manhattan
