= Dorothea Grater Minskoff =

American lawyer

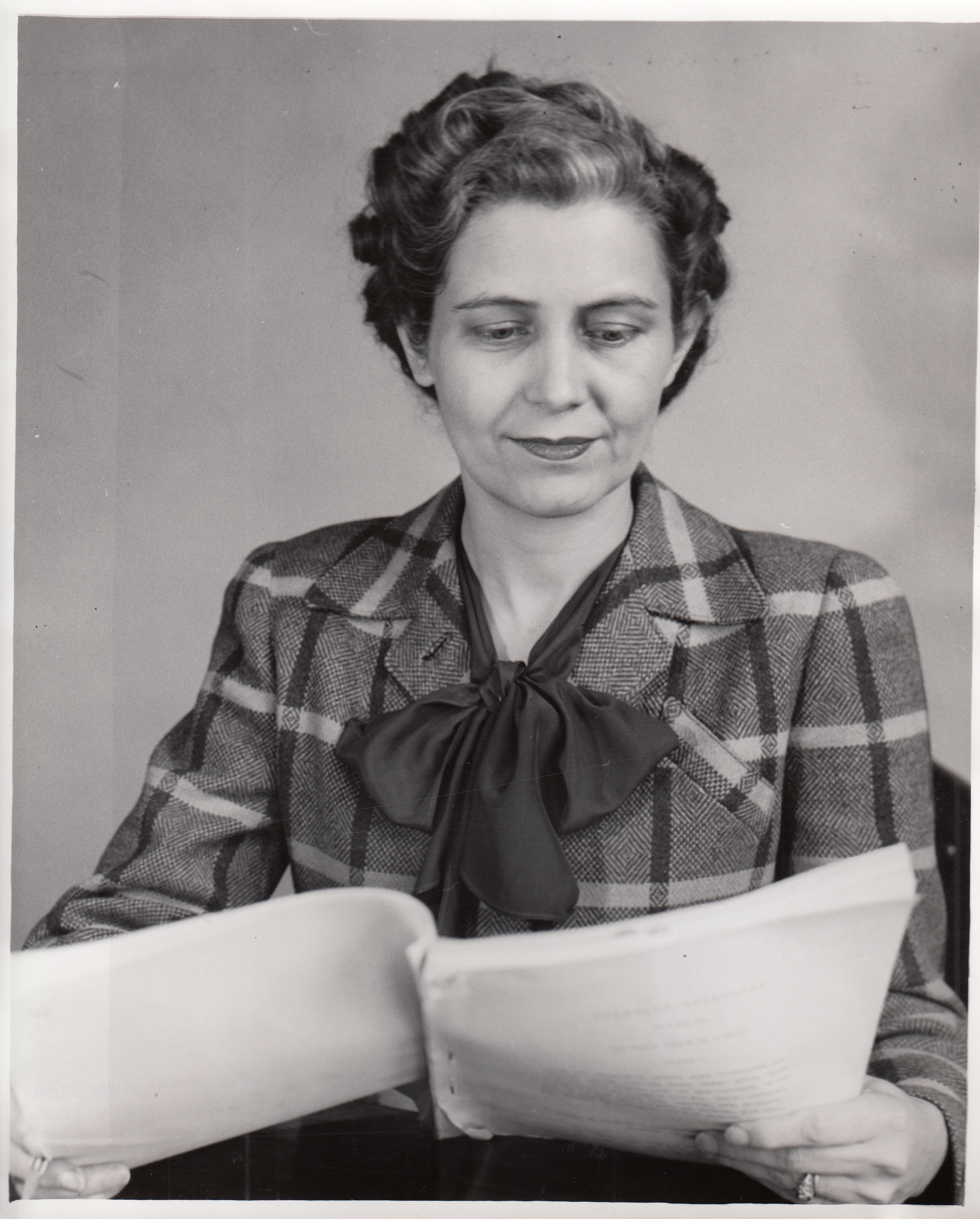
- Born: February 20, 1910; Pennsylvania, US
- Died: March 11, 1986 (aged 76); Brevard County, Florida, US
- Education: Penn Law
- Occupation: Lawyer
- Known for: Prosecutor at Nuremberg

Dorothea ("Dottie") Grater Minskoff (1910–1986) was a lawyer who participated in the Ministries Trial in Nuremberg, Germany. She was born in Pennsylvania and attended the University of Pennsylvania Law School at a time when few women were in law school.

== Personal life ==
Minskoff attended law school in the 1930s at the University of Pennsylvania Law School. She graduated from law school in 1934. Minskoff met her husband, Emanuel E. Minskoff, in law school and both were in the graduating class of 1934. They lived in New York for eight years before moving to Washington, D.C. She had two sister-in-laws and no children. Minskoff lost her husband in 1965 after a long battle with illness.

By 1978, she had moved to Florida where she died in 1986.

== Early career ==
Minskoff could not find a job as a lawyer after graduating from the University of Pennsylvania Law School. Instead, she took a job as a secretary for the American Bankers Association.

== Law practice ==
Minskoff and her husband were recruited to join the prosecution team for the Ministries Trial by their friend, Josiah E. DuBois Jr., who served as the Chief Prosecutor. The Ministries Trial was the largest, longest, and last of the Nuremberg trials where the U.S. Military prosecuted Hitler's government officials for crimes against humanity. She was one of thirty-four prosecution attorneys. She helped prosecute twenty-one Nazi officials. Her job included reviewing trial documents, including secret memos. The trials presented difficult legal questions when there was no precedent for an international criminal trial.

It was not common for women to practice law in the 1940s, let alone practice law on the international stage with a high profile trial. As a result, it was unusual that there were multiple women on the prosecution trial team.
