= One Astor Plaza =

Office skyscraper in Manhattan, New York

- Alternative names: 1515 Broadway

General information
- Type: Office
- Location: 1515 Broadway, New York, New York 10036
- Coordinates: 40°45′28″N 73°59′11″W
- Current tenants: Skydance
- Construction started: 1969
- Completed: 1972
- Opening: May 26, 1971
- Owner: SL Green Realty (53%), Allianz (47%)

Height
- Roof: 745 ft (227 m)
- Top floor: 655 ft (200 m)

Technical details
- Floor count: 54
- Floor area: 1,721,814 ft^{2} (160,000 m^{2})

Design and construction
- Architect: Der Scutt
- Developer: Sam Minskoff & Sons, Inc.

One Astor Plaza, also known as 1515 Broadway, the Skydance Building, and formerly the W. T. Grant Building, is a 54-story office building on Times Square in the Theater District of Midtown Manhattan in New York City, New York, U.S. It is owned by SL Green Realty and Allianz, and was designed by Der Scutt of Ely J. Kahn & Jacobs, the building was developed by Sam Minskoff and Sons. It is named after the Hotel Astor, which had occupied the site from 1904 to 1967, and occupies a site bounded by Broadway to the east, 45th Street to the north, Shubert Alley to the west, and 44th Street to the south. One Astor Plaza serves as the corporate headquarters of Skydance. Prior to the formation of Skydance in 2025, it served as the headquarters of Paramount Global. The building was the operational, secondary headquarters and served as major office space for Skydance (then Paramount Skydance) from August 2025 until its acquisition of Warner Bros. Discovery in 2026, when it again became the primary headquarters.

The building consists of a low base that occupies most of the site, as well as a 745-foot-tall (227 m) tower section with smaller floor areas. The facade is designed in glass and stone, with large signs. The upper stories have dark glass windows, with stone mechanical shafts on all sides of the tower. The lower stories contain a public passageway and retail at ground level, as well as a lobby and Skydance's Studio 1515 at the second story. The building was constructed with two theaters: a Broadway house called the Minskoff Theatre on the third floor, as well as a cinema in the basement (now an event venue called Palladium Times Square).

Sam Minskoff and Sons bought the Hotel Astor site in 1966 and initially proposed a 50-story tower without any theaters. Following a series of discussions, the Minskoff Theatre was included in exchange for additional floor area. Construction began on October 10, 1968, and the first tenants moved into the building in May 1971, with the building being completed the next year. One Astor Plaza was originally named after its anchor tenant, the W. T. Grant retail chain, which only occupied the space until 1976. Tishman Speyer and the Equitable Life Assurance Society bought One Astor Plaza in 1984. Tishman Speyer sold its ownership stake in 1990, just before Equitable filed a bankruptcy proceeding against the building, which was withdrawn after a lawsuit. Skydance first became involved with One Astor Plaza when its predecessor Viacom leased space in the building starting in 1990. Its predecessors gradually came to occupy most of the building. SL Green Realty has owned or co-owned the building in some capacity since 2003.

== Site ==
One Astor Plaza is at 1515 Broadway, along Times Square, in the Midtown Manhattan neighborhood of New York City, New York, U.S. While the building carries a Broadway address, it is actually on the west side of Seventh Avenue. The section of Broadway and Seventh Avenue between 43rd and 45th Streets is officially listed on city maps as "Times Square", (Note: As the two roads intersect at a very shallow angle, they are nearly parallel through Times Square. Broadway is west of Seventh Avenue to the north of 45th Street and east of Seventh Avenue to the south of 44th Street. Because Broadway between 42nd and 47th Streets was closed in the 2010s, the Paramount Building only faces Seventh Avenue.) but the adjoining section of Broadway was converted into a permanent pedestrian plaza in the 2010s. One Astor Plaza's rectangular land lot is bounded by Times Square to the east, 45th Street to the north, Shubert Alley to the west, and 44th Street to the south. The lot spans 65,764 square feet (6,109.7 m^{2}), with a frontage of 200 feet (61 m) on Times Square and 327 feet (100 m) on 44th and 45th Streets. Shubert Alley, which covers 6,400 square feet (590 m^{2}) of the land lot, is a private passageway shared with the Shubert Organization. The intersection of Times Square and 44th Street, directly outside One Astor Plaza, was renamed after Viacom founder Sumner Redstone in 2021.

The surrounding area is part of Manhattan's Theater District and contains many Broadway theatres. 1515 Broadway shares the block with seven theaters to the west: the Shubert, Broadhurst, and Majestic on 44th Street and the Booth, Gerald Schoenfeld, Bernard B. Jacobs, and John Golden theaters on 45th Street. The Music Box Theatre, Imperial Theatre, and Richard Rodgers Theatre are across 45th Street to the northwest, and the New York Marriott Marquis hotel is to the north. Across Times Square are 1540 Broadway to the northeast, 1530 Broadway and the Millennium Times Square New York to the east, and 1500 Broadway to the southeast. One Astor Plaza is also close to 1501 Broadway to the south and 229 West 43rd Street, the Hayes Theater, and the St. James Theatre to the southwest.

Prior to the development of One Astor Plaza, the site had been owned by the Astor family. The site had contained the eleven-story Hotel Astor, which had been designed by Clinton & Russell in a Beaux-Arts style and opened in 1904 with 1,000 guest rooms. The hotel had contained a red-brick facade, a mansard roof, and a lobby with a 22-foot-high colonnade. According to architecture writer Robert A. M. Stern, the Astor inspired "a new species of popular hotels that soon clustered around Times Square, vast amusement palaces that catered to crowds with scenographic interiors that mirrored the theatricality of the Great White Way."

== Architecture ==
One Astor Plaza was developed by the Sam Minskoff and Sons company and designed by Kahn and Jacobs, with Der Scutt as the principal architect. In addition, Ben Schlanger was hired as a consultant for the design of two theaters in the building: the Minskoff Theatre, a Broadway house on the third floor, and the Loews Astor Plaza (now the Palladium Times Square), originally a movie house in the basement. The building engineers are Shmerykowsky Consulting Engineers.

The building has 54 stories and measures 745 feet (227 m) to its pinnacle. According to Emporis, the building is 730 feet (220 m) tall to its main roof. Internally, One Astor Plaza is served by 36 elevators. The New York City Department of City Planning cites the building as having a Gross Floor Area of 1,721,814 square feet (160,000 m^{2}), while The Skyscraper Center gives a floor area of 1,931,982 square feet (179,000 m^{2}). Underneath the building is a parking lot for 225 cars.

=== Form and facade ===
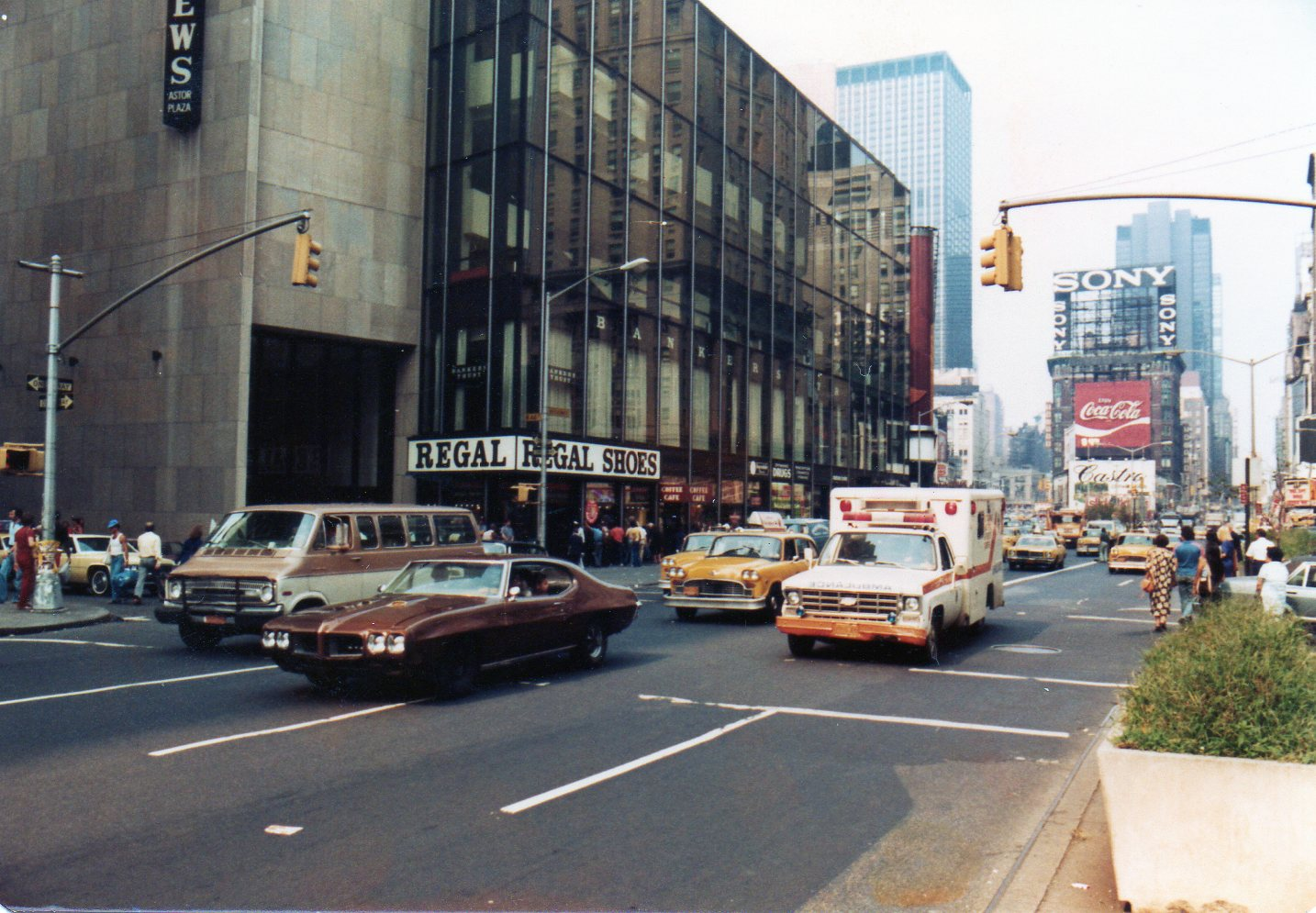
Facade in 1977

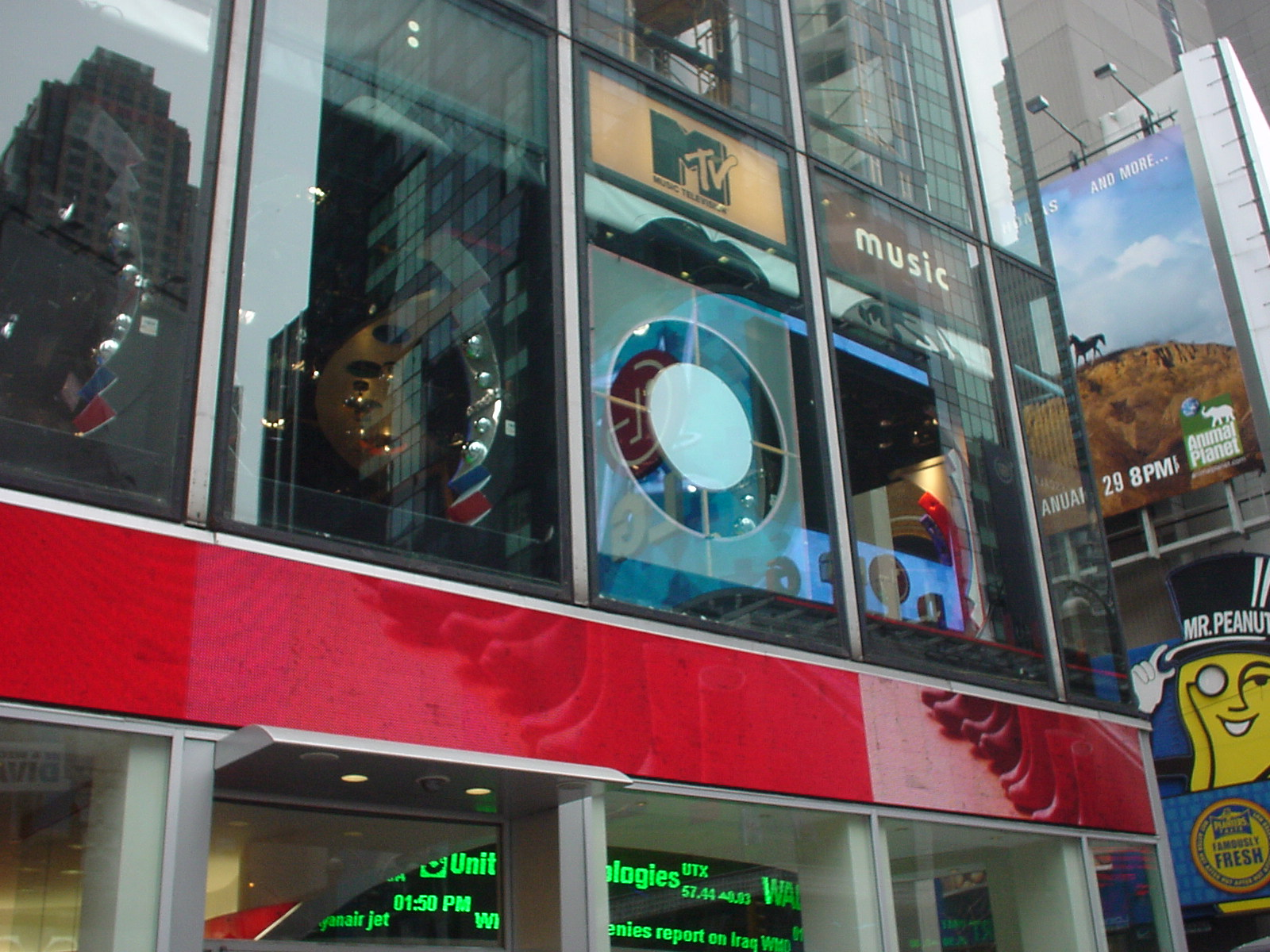
The set of Total Request Live in the Uptown Studio

One Astor Plaza consists of a 54-story office tower above a low base. The tower stories are set back 135 feet (41 m) from Broadway. Under normal zoning regulations, the maximum floor area ratio (FAR) for any building on the tower's site was 15, but the developers received two bonuses of 20 percent each, bringing the FAR to 21.6. The developers had to include privately owned public space at the building's base for the first bonus, and they built a new theater for the second bonus. The Minskoff Theatre was among the first theaters built under a 1968 regulation that allowed office buildings to include a legitimate theater in exchange for additional floor area. The bonus applied only to Broadway theaters; the movie theater in the basement did not provide any FAR bonus for the building. The building has two privately operated public spaces: the open-air Shubert Alley, as well as a ground-floor arcade beneath the center of the tower.

At the base of the tower, the facade's Broadway elevation contains a glass front. The second-floor studios contain full-height windows facing Times Square. A rooftop restaurant was originally planned for the setback above the Minskoff Theatre on the third floor, but it was never built. During a 2008 renovation by Kohn Pedersen Fox (KPF), the glass facade of the studios and theater was extended upward by 42 feet (13 m). Two pairs of three-story-high LED signs are installed along the base's northeast and southeast corners. Each pair of signs consists of a primary display facing each intersection, used for advertising, and a smaller display facing Times Square's western sidewalk, used for displaying show information for Minskoff Theatre. The primary displays measure 48 feet (15 m) high by 36 feet (11 m) wide, while the smaller displays are 48 feet high by 7 feet 10 inches (2.39 m) wide.

The tower's facade is largely made of dark glass. Vertically aligned, stone-clad mechanical ducts are placed on each side, separating the leftmost quarter from the rightmost three-quarters of the facade. These mechanical shafts rise above the roof, terminating in pointed pinnacles at each corner of the roof. The shafts were overlaid by aluminum panels during KPF's 2008 renovation. A stone band also runs at the top of the roof. The use of pinnacles and stonework was a departure from previous International Style buildings with flat roofs. Initially, the top of the building contained signs on all four sides, spelling out the name W. T. Grant, the original anchor tenant. The signs consisted of illuminated 20-foot-tall (6.1 m) letters. They were removed in 1976 when W. T. Grant went bankrupt.

=== Structural features ===
One Astor Plaza's superstructure is made of steel floor spans around a concrete core. The superstructure contains some uncommon features due to the presence of the Minskoff Theatre at the base. In typical skyscrapers, the columns of the superstructure could extend directly to the underlying bedrock, but One Astor Plaza's eastern section was directly above the theater and had to be supported entirely by the theater's roof. The steel was provided by Bethlehem Steel; its supervising engineer Thomas Connolly said One Astor Plaza's superstructure "would have been a snap from an engineering point of view", but the theater's presence made for "a humdinger of an engineering feat". The theater roof is a Vierendeel truss that rests on two girders, one weighing 89 short tons (79 long tons; 81 t) and the other weighing 109 short tons (97 long tons; 99 t). These girders were the heaviest in any building at the time, and they had to be delivered in several pieces from the factory, itself an intricate operation.

=== Interior ===
==== Palladium Times Square ====
The Loews Astor Plaza movie theater originally occupied the building's public space below street level, accessible from 44th Street. It opened on June 26, 1974, and was the city's largest capacity cinema at 1,440 or 1,500 seats. The single-screen theater was designed with a steeply raked stadium seating layout and was intended to show the first runs of major films. There were 42 rows of seats facing the screen, which was 20 yards (18 m) wide. After an unsuccessful attempt to divide the theater into six screens in 1993, the theater closed in July 2004. After a $21 million renovation, the space reopened in 2005 as a music venue under the ownership of Anschutz Entertainment Group. The venue was originally sponsored by Nokia, then by Best Buy in 2010 and PlayStation in 2015. The PlayStation Theater closed on December 31, 2019, and it reopened as the Palladium Times Square event venue in 2020.

==== Ground level and lobby ====
The building's main entrances are at the southeast and northeast corners, facing Times Square. Inside the entrances, escalators lead to the office lobby, which is on the second floor. The lobby contains the artwork Alight Embrace by Chris Cosma, which was installed in 2010. The artwork consists of a 4,000-square-foot (370 m^{2}) section of wall between the two entrances, weighing 60 short tons (54 long tons; 54 t), and is made up of 1,100 glass panels measuring 16 by 36 by 2 inches (406 by 914 by 51 mm).

At the first floor, there is a covered arcade under the center of the building, connecting 44th and 45th Streets. This passageway is also unofficially known as Minskoff Alley. The space covers 5,800 square feet (540 m^{2}). The arcade provides an entrance to the Minskoff Theatre, which is accessed primarily by escalators. From 1982 to 1986, the arcade also contained a museum dedicated to the history of Broadway theatre, including photographs and memorabilia. The ground level also contains retailers. During the 2000s and 2010s, these included a Bank of America branch with three floor-to-ceiling stock ticker signs; a 19,000-square-foot (1,800 m^{2}) Aeropostale clothing store; an Oakley, Inc. sports accessories store; and a Swatch watch store. Facing Shubert Alley was an Italian restaurant called Cucina and a Junior's restaurant. As of 2022, Oakley, Kiko Milano, and Swatch were among the retail tenants.

==== Second-floor studios ====
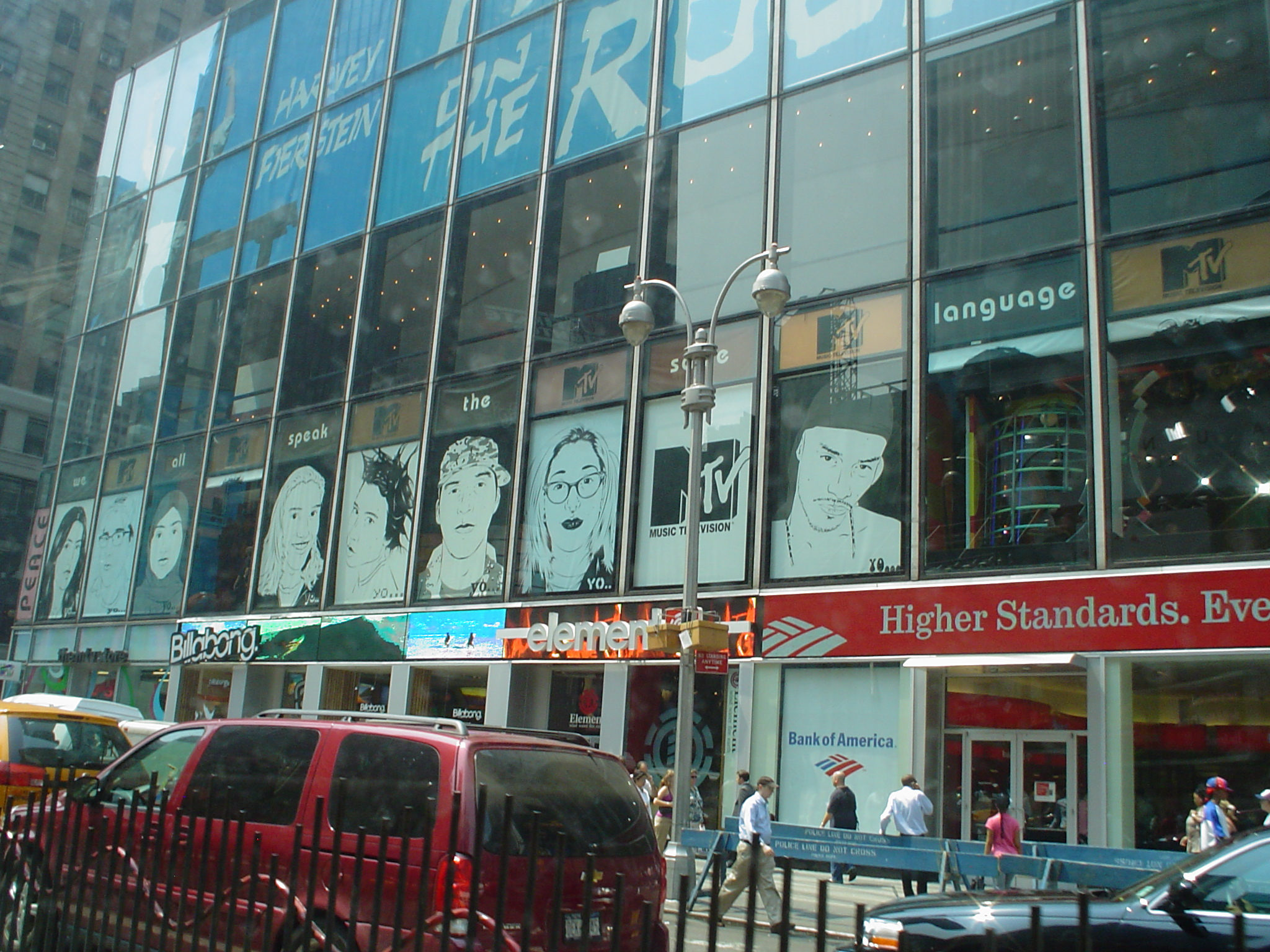
Uptown, Midtown and Downtown Studios & Aeropostale, Billabong, Element and Oakley store.

Originally, the second floor was occupied by a branch of the Bankers Trust bank. The branch adjoined the building's main lobby and contained a domed ceiling, as well as design features reminiscent of early-20th-century banks. The bank's office also contained a glass enclosure with an escalator between the lobby and the Minskoff Theatre, as well as a vault. By the 1990s, this level served as offices for Viacom's human-resources department.

Viacom repurposed the space as a 20,000-square-foot (1,900 m^{2}) television studio for MTV Networks, launching operations in 1997. According to MTV president Judy McGrath, the studio had full-height windows on Times Square because "We want to get people to feel what it's like to be in New York, to be part of that incredible playground down there". The MTV broadcasting complex initially consisted of three studios. The largest was the Uptown Studio, which had the full-height windows on Times Square and was used by Total Request Live. Two smaller studios, the Midtown Studio and the Downtown Studio, were used for MTV News and smaller programs.

Despite reports that MTV planned to completely vacate its studio space, Viacom renewed its lease for a smaller portion of the space in late 2010. The remaining portion was leased to Aeropostale, which operated in the space from 2010 until 2016. Viacom re-leased the Aeropostale space in 2017 in preparation for its relaunch of TRL.

In 2020, after CBS Corporation and Viacom merged again, CBS News used part of the MTV Studios space for its coverage of the 2020 presidential election; the windows were blanked out for security reasons. In September 2021, CBS's new morning show CBS Mornings premiered in a portion of the MTV Studios space (replacing CBS This Morning, which aired from the CBS Broadcast Center), using a modified version of the election set. The studio was christened "Studio 1515" in reference to the building's address. MTV retains a portion of studio space in the southern end of the building (which formerly comprised the Downtown Studio), most recently for its now defunct weekly Fresh Out Live program. Comedy Central's The Daily Show with Trevor Noah was temporarily housed in One Astor Plaza from September 2021 to March 2022. In 2025, CBS Mornings moved back to CBS Broadcast Center.

==== Third floor ====
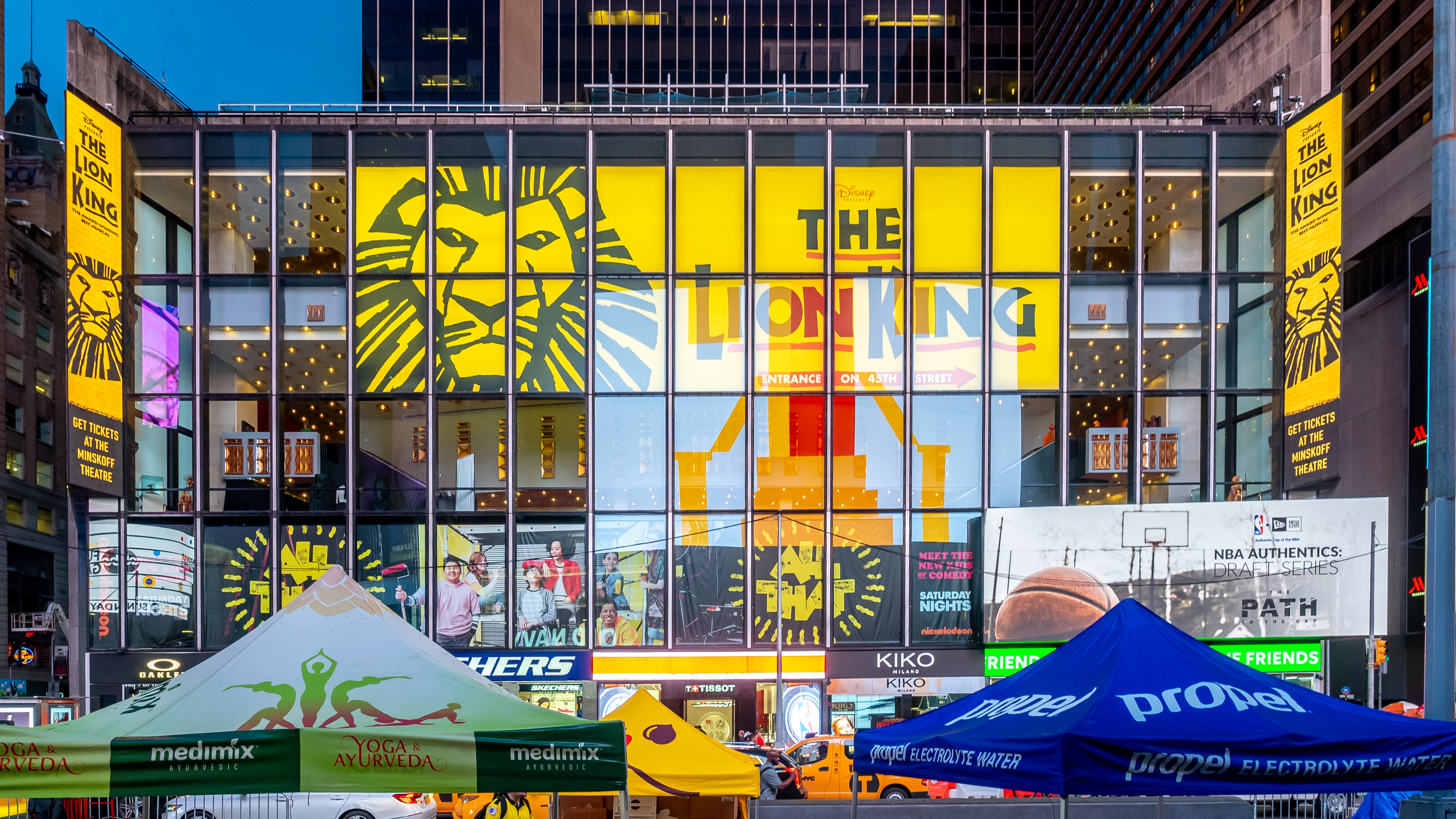
The facade of the Minskoff Theatre from Times Square

One Astor Plaza's Broadway theater, Minskoff Theatre, was named after the building's developers and is on the building's third floor. Der Scutt designed the Minskoff, with Ben Schlanger as a consulting architect. Jo Mielziner was the consultant for the theater's original operator, Albert Selden. The Minskoff, Gershwin, Circle in the Square, and American Place theaters were all constructed under the Special Theater District amendment of 1967 as a way to give their respective developers additional floor area. The escalators from the building's ground-story arcade lead to the third-floor grand foyer, where additional escalators lead to the auditorium seating. The Minskoff Theatre has 1,621 seats across two levels: a steeply raked orchestra and a smaller mezzanine. The Nederlander Organization operates the theater.

Formerly, the third floor also contained the Minskoff Recording Studios, which opened in 1976. Originally, the studios ranged in size from 11 by 11 feet (3.4 by 3.4 m) to 32 by 38 feet (9.8 by 11.6 m). Each studio was soundproofed, enabling numerous tenants to use the studios simultaneously. These studios hosted rehearsals for many large Broadway musicals, as they were the only studios in the area that could accommodate large Broadway productions. By the late 1980s, the studio sizes ranged from 270 square feet (25 m^{2}) for studio 7 to 1,856 square feet (172.4 m^{2}) for studio 3. Rental rates for the studios varied depending on the studios' sizes, with studio 7 charging $10 an hour and studio 3 charging $5 per hour, although discounted rates were charged for eight-hour and week-long rentals. Despite the studios' popularity, they closed in 1989 due to rising rents.

== History ==
After World War II, development of theaters around Times Square stalled, and the area began to evolve into a business district. The first proposal to convert the Astor Hotel site to offices had been put forth in 1947, when Metro-Goldwyn-Mayer had unsuccessfully proposed leasing the entire hotel for its own offices. When real estate developers Webb and Knapp leased the hotel in 1954, they pledged to keep the hotel operating. Astor Associates bought the hotel in 1958 and took over operation after Webb and Knapp went bankrupt in 1965. Webb and Knapp's former president William Zeckendorf formed Place de L'Etoile Inc. in December 1965, seeking to buy the Astor Hotel, but this was unsuccessful. The New York Times attributed the hotel's decline to the fact that, because of the growing popularity of automobiles, visitors could stay in a suburb rather than the city's center.

=== Planning ===
==== Initial plans ====
In January 1966, Sam Minskoff and Sons paid $10.5 million for the Hotel Astor and the eastern section of Shubert Alley, with plans to erect a 40-story office building on the site. At the time, a tax assessment valued the land at $8.4 million. Within a week of the sale being announced, Minskoff & Sons president Henry Minskoff said several companies had expressed interest in leasing large amounts of space in the new skyscraper. The Minskoffs hired Kahn and Jacobs as the architects in May 1966, and the hotel was closed on June 30, 1966, the day before Minskoff & Sons took title to the site. The old hotel's furnishings were sold off in October 1966. The Minskoffs demolished the rear of the hotel first because there was a restaurant at the front of the hotel, whose lease did not expire until 1967. The Hercules Wrecking Corporation began demolishing the hotel in January 1967, anticipating to complete the job within five months. However, the demolition was delayed because of the hotel's structural durability (the hotel had contained 2-foot-thick (0.61 m) walls and heavy-gauge structural steel) and city regulations that required all wood to be removed from the building. The hotel was not completely demolished until February 1968.

In January 1967, Kahn and Jacobs announced that Minskoff's tower, One Astor Plaza, would be 50 stories tall with a facade of stone and tinted glass. There would be a 125-foot-deep (38 m) plaza along Broadway, as well as plazas along the sides and rear, to comply with the 1961 Zoning Resolution. The Minskoffs requested zoning amendments to allow the construction of an office building, as well as a modification of the site's sky exposure plane (Note: In New York City, the wall of any given tower that faces a street could only rise to a certain height, proportionate to the street's width. Above this height, the building had to be set back by a given proportion, the sky exposure plane.) to maximize the amount of office space that faced Broadway. At the time, city officials were encouraging the westward expansion of office towers in Manhattan. There were few efforts to preserve existing Broadway theaters, since theatrical experts believed the existing theaters (all built before World War II) were functionally obsolete. Consequently, the plans for One Astor Plaza initially did not include a theater. The Minskoffs' application for zoning amendments would have been a routine matter, but a member of the New York City Planning Commission (CPC) notified the Urban Design Group (UDG) about the application. This brought the attention of New York City mayor John Lindsay, a fan of Broadway theater.

==== Theater efforts ====
The UDG proposed that One Astor Plaza include a theater, a suggestion that the Minskoffs initially opposed. The family brought their concerns to CPC chairman Donald H. Elliott, who supported the theater, then to mayor Lindsay, who not only endorsed the CPC and UDG but convinced the Minskoffs to include a theater in their tower. The Minskoffs then submitted several alternative plans for a tower on the Astor site. The first such plan called for a tower that had twice the site's maximum floor area ratio, with a theater in the back. A second plan called for a tower, which Richard Weinstein of the UDG subsequently recalled as "a mindless, ominous, faceless structure, legal under existing zoning, with two low, clawlike appendages [...] pinching a small plaza between them". Though Weinstein said he initially remembered "feeling very depressed" at the Minskoffs' tower-with-theater plans, Elliott was "elated", saying: "I think you guys have got your theater". When Weinstein expressed his doubts about the building's floor area, Elliott responded: "Oh, that. That just shows they're ready to negotiate."

In October 1967, the CPC proposed the Special Theater District Zoning Amendment, which gave zoning bonuses to office-building developers who included theaters. The proposed legislation would directly allow theaters in One Astor Plaza and the Uris Building, which would be the first completely new Broadway theaters since the Mark Hellinger Theatre was completed in 1930. (Note: The Hellinger was initially a movie theater and did not become a Broadway venue until 1949. The Lunt-Fontanne Theatre and Palace Theatre were converted from movies to Broadway theaters afterward, but both theater buildings are physically older than the Hellinger. The last venue to be built as a Broadway theater, operating continuously in that capacity, was the Ethel Barrymore Theatre, completed in 1928.) The Minskoffs were allowed to build 47 stories as-of-right, or without any zoning bonuses, but the Minskoffs could add 125,000 square feet (11,600 m^{2}) in exchange for building a Broadway theater. The CPC approved the theater amendment that November, and the New York City Board of Estimate gave final approval to the proposal the next month. As planning progressed, members of the Broadway-theatre industry expressed concerns that theatrical experts had not been consulted in the design of One Astor Plaza's theater.

Lehman Brothers became partners in One Astor Plaza in March 1968. At the time, the vacant site was being used for parking, since the Minskoffs were requesting city approval for another modification that would allow a movie theater to be built in the basement. The next month, the CPC scheduled a public hearing to determine whether the Astor and Uris theater permits should be approved, including a second theater in the Uris Building. Six parties testified in favor; the Shubert Organization, the largest operator of Broadway theaters, was the only dissenting speaker. The CPC approved the theater over the Shuberts' objections, as did the Board of Estimate. In the meantime, the vacant lot was used in September 1968 for a benefit for the film Funny Girl, hosted by Barbra Streisand. Albert W. Selden had tentatively agreed to lease the Broadway theater in One Astor Plaza. The building was to contain 1.4 million square feet (130,000 m^{2}) across 54 floors, including three restaurants and the two theaters.

=== Construction ===
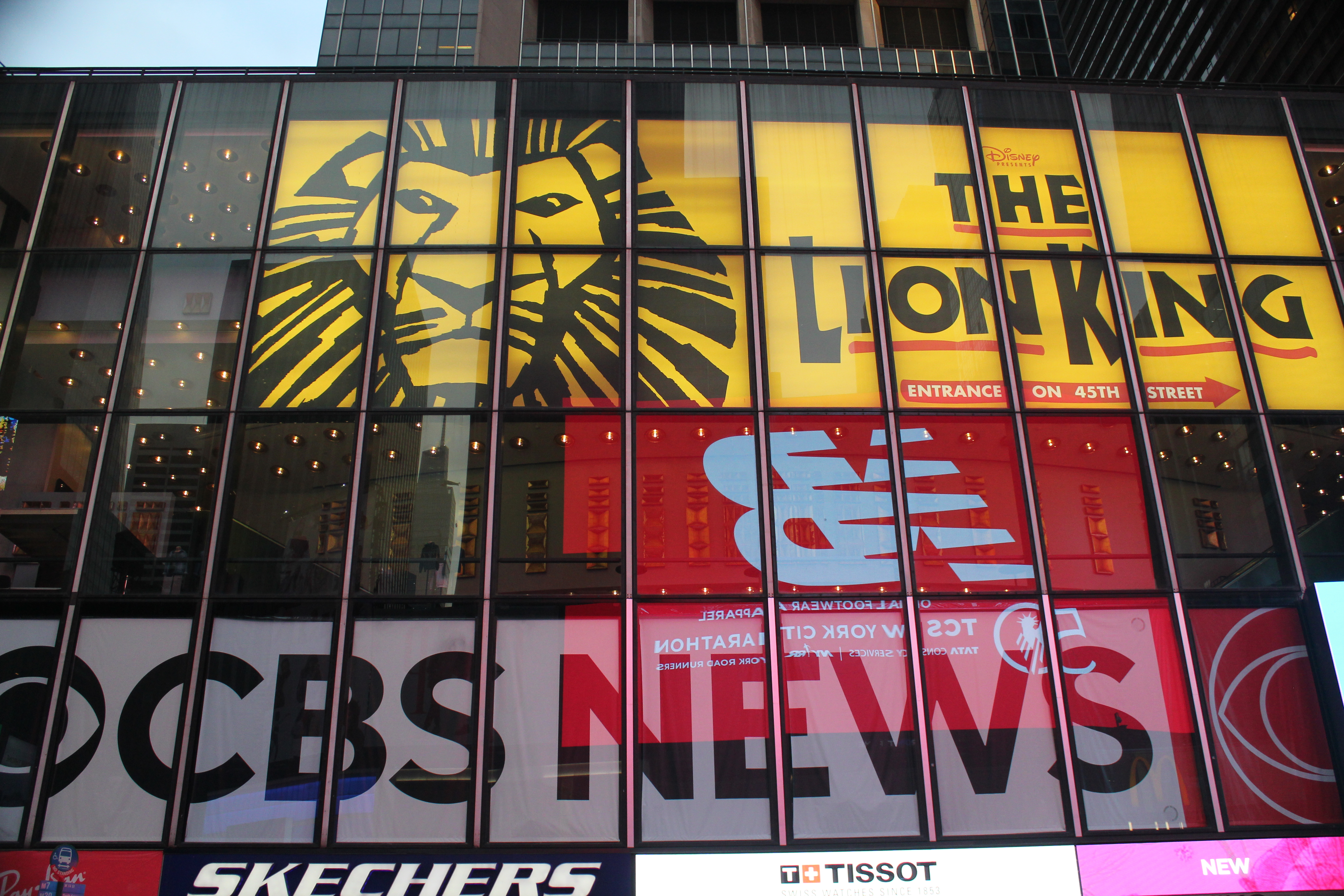
Studios at base

Mayor Lindsay attended the groundbreaking ceremony for One Astor Plaza on October 10, 1968. One Astor Plaza was one of 23 major office projects underway in New York City at the time. During excavation, the contractors bored holes up to 10 feet (3.0 m) deep, then placed dynamite sticks in the holes, covering the openings with 14-by-14-foot (4.3 by 4.3 m) blasting mats before detonating the dynamite. As part of an agreement with the Shubert Organization, the blasts did not occur when there were matinee performances at the Shubert Theatre and other nearby theaters. The 1,562-seat movie theater was leased in January 1969 by Walter Reade, who also planned to operate the fourth through ninth floors of offices. Fawcett Publications signed a long-term lease for three floors in One Astor Plaza that February, followed the next month by Quality Bakers of America's lease of two floors. Work on One Astor Plaza temporarily stopped in July 1969 due to a labor strike.

The project faced some delays due to the inclusion of the Broadway theater at the building's base, as well as rising costs and decreasing demand for office space. Although Minskoff & Sons president Jerome Minskoff had agreed to the theater as "our way of paying the city back", he said this had increased costs by up to 30 percent, from $55 to $70 million. Furthermore, Selden insisted that a modern technical system be installed in the new theater, which would add $400,000 to the cost. A fire broke out on the upper stories in August 1970, and glass fell from the building during two separate incidents that November, when facade installation was progressing on the lower stories. Several glass panes fell on November 5, and a worker was injured on November 29 when glass panes fell during a heavy wind. The two incidents prompted an investigation, but the city's acting buildings commissioner could not find a clear cause for the falling glass.

By 1970, a combined 5 million square feet (460,000 m^{2}) of office space was being developed along Broadway in Midtown, much of which stood vacant due to a slowdown in office leasing. W. T. Grant became the building's largest tenant in December 1970, leasing 400,000 square feet (37,000 m^{2}), including the entire 40th through 53rd floors. In exchange, One Astor Plaza would be formally known as the W. T. Grant Building, and the company's name would be placed in large letters atop the building. Simultaneously, the Minskoffs agreed to pay off the lease on W. T. Grant's existing office space at 1441 Broadway. The next month, the Walter Reade Organization sought to sublet all six floors of its own space. Bankers Trust leased a bank branch on the second story in March 1971. An internal newsletter in October 1971 described the tower as being "80 percent leased"; that rate had increased to 87 percent by the next month.

=== Completion and early years ===
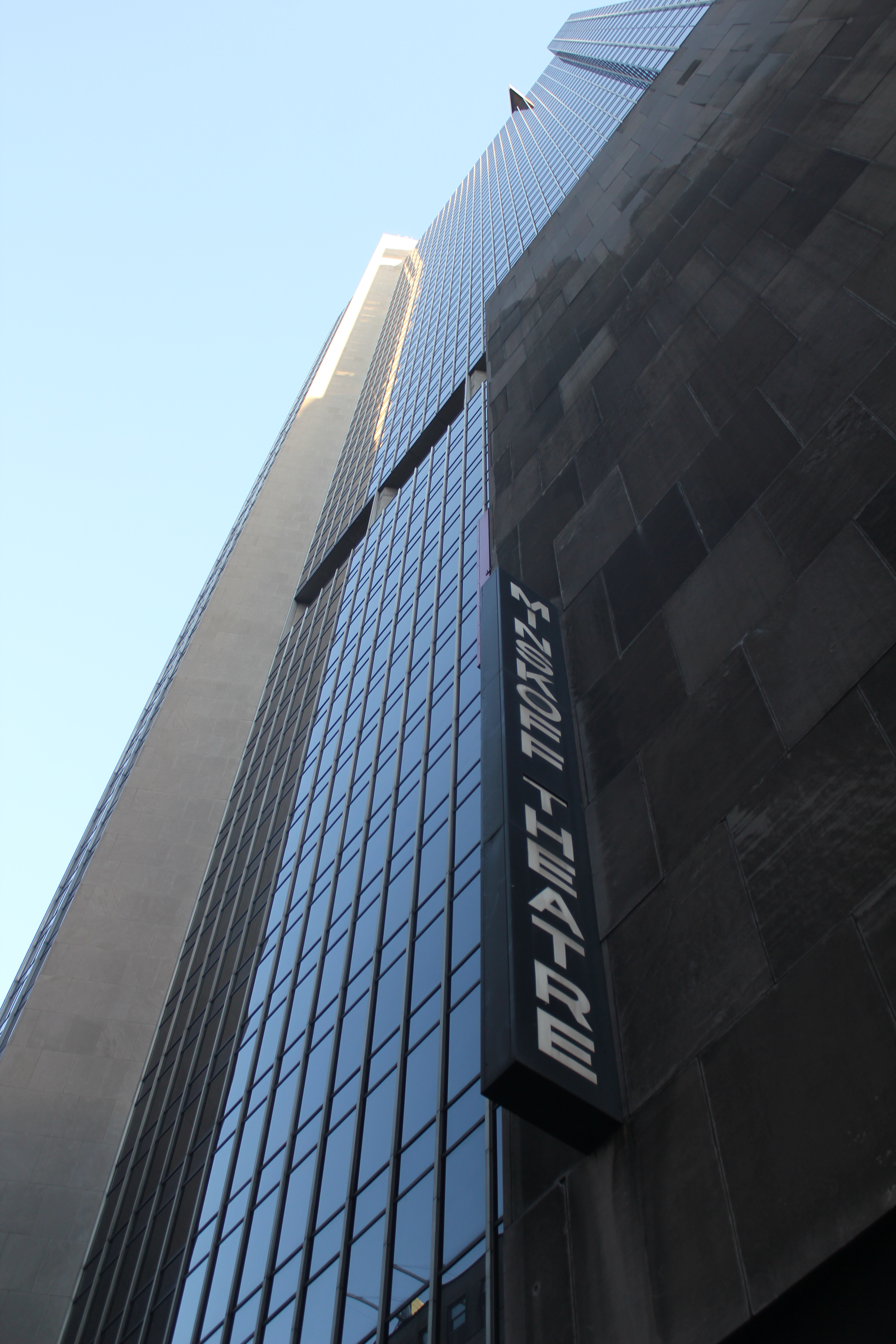
Southern facade of One Astor Plaza as seen from ground level

Fawcett Publications was the first tenant at the building, moving into the 12th through 16th floors on May 26, 1971. One Astor Plaza was still incomplete at the time, but Fawcett's lease at its previous location had already expired, forcing the company to move into the building. The building was planned to be formally renamed that November when W. T. Grant moved in, but the company's relocation into the building was then delayed to mid-1972. The movie theater in the basement was supposed to open in December 1971, but the opening was delayed indefinitely because of what Reade said were "construction difficulties beyond our control". Among these issues was Reade's concern that the auditorium needed to be insulated from the adjacent subway tunnels. Shortly after the building was completed, a window-washing scaffold fell from One Astor Plaza's facade in March 1972, killing two workers. The building's parking garage and three retail stores were leased in early 1972. Other tenants included the Bureau of Labor Statistics; Billboard Publications, which leased one floor; and accounting firm Clarence Rainess & Co., which leased one and a half floors.

By January 1973, the Minskoff was ready to open, but the basement cinema had not even been furnished yet because of continuing disputes over subway soundproofing. The Minskoff Theatre officially opened on March 13, 1973. Reade ended his lease of the basement movie theater the next month, citing financial difficulties. Further issues concerned the building's valuation, which had been reduced from $45.3 to $40.8 million during 1971–1972; the reduction had been granted because the Minskoffs falsely stated that One Astor Plaza was mostly vacant. The building's name also caused problems, as mail addressed to "1 Astor Pl." could be meant either for the building in Times Square or a car-rental agency on Astor Place several miles south.

The Loews movie chain leased the basement movie theater in April 1974, and the Loews Astor Plaza movie theater opened on June 25, 1974. That December, Ted Bates & Co. subleased some of its space to W. R. Grace and Company, Gralla Publications, and Nathan's Famous. One Astor Plaza's anchor tenant W. T. Grant had gone bankrupt by late 1975 and initially planned to downsize to four and a half floors. However, W. T. Grant subsequently decided to leave the building altogether, so the company's signage was removed from One Astor Plaza in March 1976. This created about 330,000 square feet (31,000 m^{2}) of vacant space, about a quarter of the whole building. The third floor was also reconstructed in 1976 to accommodate the Minskoff Recording Studios.

Research firm Frederick Atkins Inc. leased four floors of the former W. T. Grant space in March 1977. The New York Telephone Company took another four floors in May 1979. By then, most of the building's vacant space had been filled; the other tenants included CBS and the New York State Urban Development Corporation (UDC). Also in 1979, the architectural firm of Battaglia, Seckler completed a three-story complex for the Alvin Ailey American Dance Theater within One Astor Plaza. The complex included a reception room, a lounge, changing rooms, and four studios overlooking 45th Street. In addition, the Alvin Ailey dance school operated within a space off the Minskoff Arcade. A theater museum was also being planned for the arcade at the time. One Astor Plaza was fully rented by 1980. Two years later, the Museum of the City of New York opened a museum in the ground-story arcade, dedicated to the history of Broadway theater.

=== Equitable ownership ===
==== Acquisition and increased rents ====
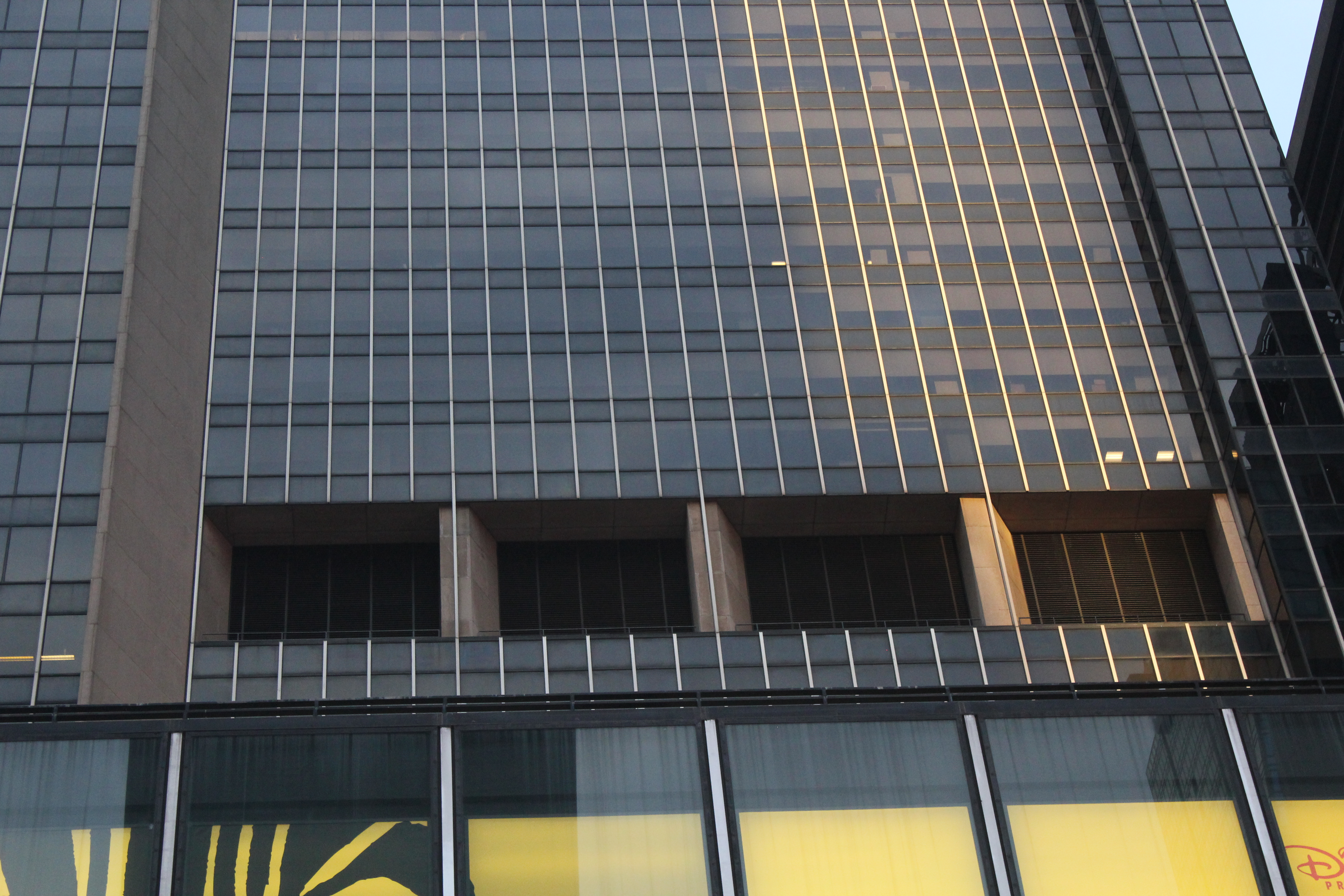
Center stories

One Astor Plaza was sold in July 1984 to Tishman Speyer and the Equitable Life Assurance Society. The price was variously cited as $190 million, $200 million, $202 million, or $210 million. The sale included a contract between the Minskoffs and a joint venture of The Related Companies and Shearson/American Express, which in turn sold its contract to Tishman Speyer and Equitable. According to Jerry Speyer of Tishman Speyer, he had decided to buy the building after coming across Related president Stephen M. Ross during a morning jog. At the time, the real estate market in New York City was growing, and Equitable had projected that the building would generate $40 million in gross income by 1991. In 1985, Tishman Speyer formed a limited partnership, 1515 Broadway Associates LP, to assume ownership of the building; the partnership's only asset was One Astor Plaza. The 25 limited partners, who gave a combined $77 million, were primarily executives at Bear Stearns. In exchange for a 30 percent stake in the building, Equitable agreed to be the general partner and guarantee 10 percent of the building's mortgage loan.

One Astor Plaza needed to be renovated to comply with modern building codes, including the addition of fire sprinklers and the removal of asbestos. The average rent for offices at One Astor Plaza was $8 per square foot ($86/m^{2}), far below the market rate, but Tishman Speyer and Equitable had planned to upgrade the building and raise rents. Consequently, the Minskoff Recording Studios were nearly evicted in October 1984, but the studio's operators negotiated a concession in which the studio would pay $10 per square foot ($110/m^{2}). The Alvin Ailey American Dance Theatre was also nearly forced out because of the increasing rents. The theater museum in the ground-story arcade was closed in 1986 due to low attendance. Despite the success of the third-floor Minskoff Studios, they were in danger of eviction by 1988, and they ultimately closed the next year. The building's rising rents also displaced the Bureau of Labor Statistics in 1986 and the Alvin Ailey American Dance Theater in 1989.

==== Bankruptcy and improvements ====
Tishman Speyer then renovated the lobby and elevators in 1989. The same year, Viacom International Inc. negotiated to lease several stories in One Astor Plaza for 20 years. The company planned to occupy 400,000 square feet (37,000 m^{2}) initially, with an option to expand by another 200,000 square feet (19,000 m^{2}). Though the building's owners hoped to gain additional large tenants, they did not sign another lease for 14 months after the Viacom lease. Furthermore, several existing tenants including Diamandis Communications and Ted Bates Worldwide were moving out, leaving the owners without enough income to make further improvements to the building. Nonetheless, Viacom moved into One Astor Plaza in 1990 and was one of several companies to take up large amounts of space in Times Square.

1515 Broadway Associates LP filed for Chapter 11 bankruptcy protection in October 1990, shortly after Tishman Speyer gave up its general-partnership interest. The main reason for the Chapter 11 filing was so Equitable could renegotiate the 13.6 percent interest rate on the building's mortgage. An Equitable official said at the time that the partnership had lost $30 million a year for the past several years, and the rental income could not cover the mortgage payments. As a result of the Chapter 11 proceeding, ownership of One Astor Plaza reverted to Manufacturers Hanover Trust, one of several banks that had collectively lent $300 million to the partnership. Shortly afterward, Manufacturers Hanover sued Equitable for $600 million, claiming that Equitable had backtracked on an agreement to cover the partners' cash deficit. Manufacturers Hanover also claimed that Tishman Speyer's chief executive, Gerald Speyer, had opposed a bankruptcy proceeding. At a court hearing in March 1991, an Equitable official testified that he had misled the limited partners so they did not know about Equitable's intention to file for bankruptcy protection until it had already happened.

Shortly after the court hearing, Manufacturers Hanover and Equitable agreed to a tentative settlement in which Equitable would extend a $95 million line of credit to the limited partners. In exchange, Manufacturers Hanover's lawsuit and Equitable's Chapter 11 filing would be withdrawn. The bankruptcy filing was thus dropped in December 1991. Throughout these legal disputes, Equitable continued to maintain the building's services and attempted to not only retain existing occupants but also attract new tenants by providing favorable concessions. For example, a new advertising tenant received a non-disturbance agreement and a low rental rate, and an existing merchandising tenant expanded its space in the building at a lower rental rate. Additionally, Equitable covered the brokers' fees and tenant-improvement charges for new tenants for several years. Equitable's success in leasing One Astor Plaza was also influenced by the lack of tenants at two newer developments nearby, 1540 and 1585 Broadway, during the early 1990s.

==== Viacom takeover ====
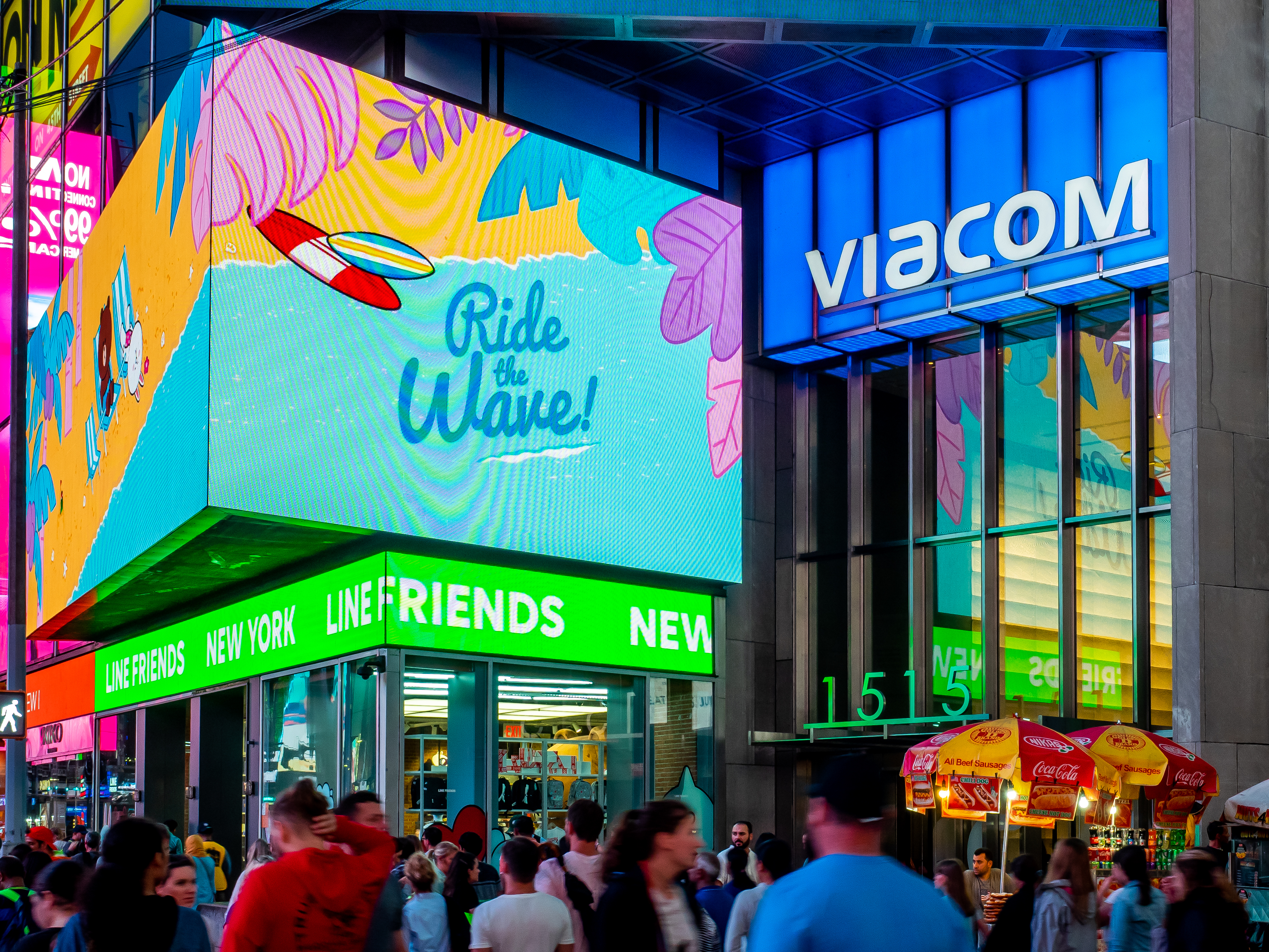
Viacom (later Paramount) entrance, seen in 2019

After an acquisition of Paramount Communications by Viacom was proposed in 1993, deputy mayor Barry F. Sullivan said the move had "exciting potential for Times Square" because the company might move into One Astor Plaza. Following Viacom's acquisition, Paramount relocated from 15 Columbus Circle to One Astor Plaza, and the expanded Viacom took up 25 floors, housing subsidiaries such as Nickelodeon and MTV in the building. Viacom thus became the tower's largest tenant, occupying 800,000 square feet (74,000 m^{2}), with options to take other floors as existing tenants' leases expired. Equitable had been able to remove the asbestos and rent nearly all the space at rates of around $30 to $39 per square foot ($320 to $420/m^{2}). Viacom received a tax incentive of $15 million to retain its offices at One Astor Plaza and three other buildings. The state UDC, which had occupied nine floors, left the building in the following years as Viacom continued to expand.

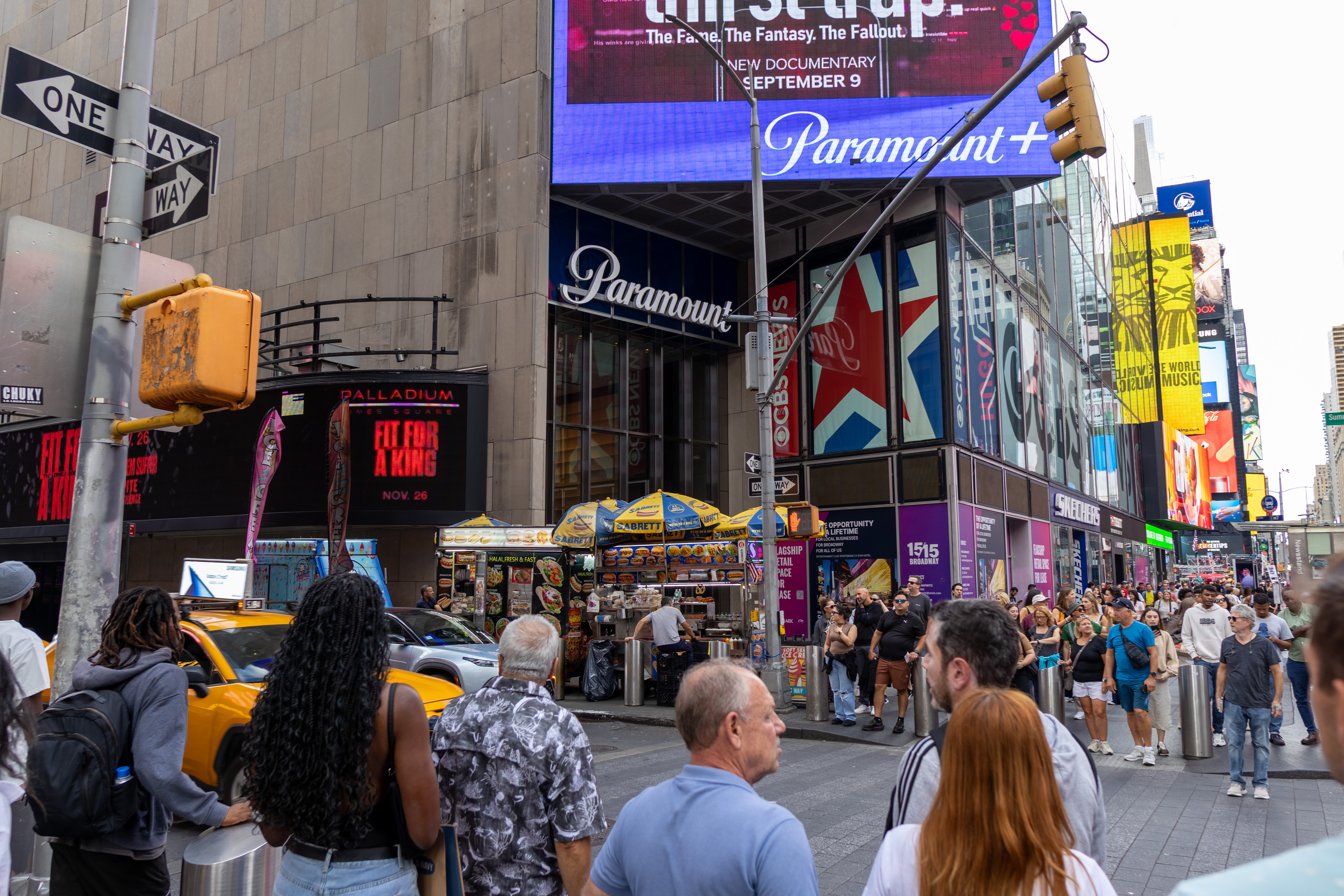
Paramount Skydance offices at One Astor Plaza in NYC, seen in August 2025

In September 1997, MTV opened studios at One Astor Plaza's second floor after an $8 million renovation. By then, Viacom was one of several major media companies on Times Square, and ABC and CBS were also contemplating studios on Times Square. CBS and Viacom announced in 1999 that they would merge, and Viacom renewed its lease at One Astor Plaza, though the company planned to sell CBS's nearby headquarters, the CBS Building. By early 2001, Viacom had planned to buy One Astor Plaza in conjunction with its sale of the CBS Building. That August, Equitable hired Goldman Sachs to market One Astor Plaza; Equitable had rejected an offer to swap One Astor Plaza for the CBS Building directly because the latter building was worth much less. The transaction was ultimately canceled in November 2001. This was attributed in part to Viacom's demand that any buyer first acquire One Astor Plaza and then swap that for the CBS Building and cash; such a transaction would enable Viacom to avoid paying estate transfer taxes on the transaction.

=== SL Green ownership ===
==== 2000s ====
In March 2002, a joint venture led by SL Green Realty acquired One Astor Plaza for approximately $480 million, the city's largest real-estate transaction since the September 11 attacks. SL Green had a 55 percent ownership stake while its partner SITQ Immobilier (a subsidiary of Canadian pension fund CDPQ), had the remaining 45 percent. SL Green was required to have terrorism insurance on the building, and the sale demonstrated that large buildings such as One Astor Plaza could obtain such insurance. SL Green chairman Stephen L. Green considered One Astor Plaza a "core building" to his portfolio but, according to Crain's New York magazine, those in the real estate industry believed that Green had overvalued the building. Alliance Building Service, operated by Green's son Gary, was hired to provide cleaning and security services for the building. After acquiring the building, SL Green sought to replace five storefronts on Broadway with one large retailer. SL Green also bought out the lease of the Loews Astor Plaza movie theater and closed it in 2004; reopening it the next year as an event venue operated by AEG Live. CBS and Viacom ultimately split in 2005.

By 2008, the downsized Viacom was still the largest office tenant of One Astor Plaza, occupying 1.5 million square feet (140,000 m^{2}); the building only had 130,000 square feet (12,000 m^{2}) available for lease. Viacom's leases were scheduled to expire within two years, and the company was moving some divisions elsewhere, including Comedy Central. Viacom renewed its lease in December 2008, extending it by five years. The same year, SL Green also hired KPF to renovate the lobby and facade to make the building compliant with LEED Silver green building standards. The work was completed in 2009 for $40 million. Though other tenants continued to occupy the building, including law firms, Times Square was no longer appealing to small tenants by then because of the high rents.

==== 2010s to present ====
In May 2010, a terrorist car bombing attempt occurred outside the building, although the bomb was defused before it could be detonated. SL Green refinanced 1515 Broadway for $475 million in 2010, and CDPQ sold its stake in the tower to SL Green the next year. In April 2012, Viacom signed a lease to take over all 1.6 million square feet (150,000 m^{2}) at 1515 Broadway through 2031, taking the remaining space as other tenants' leases expired. This was the fourth-largest lease in New York City history and the largest that was not a sale and lease back by a building's previous owner. In conjunction with this lease, the Bank of China gave SL Green a $775 million, seven-year first mortgage for the building. At the time, Viacom provided the bulk of the building's rental income, paying $78 million a year. SL Green also agreed to upgrade 1515 Broadway for Viacom and installed three-story-tall advertising screens on the Times Square facade in 2013; the building was refinanced that year for $900 million.

SL Green was looking to sell a minority stake in the building by 2017, and the China Investment Corporation reportedly expressed interest. That November, Allianz bought a 43 percent ownership stake and some of the debt in a deal that valued 1515 Broadway at $1.95 billion. At the time, Viacom occupied 85 percent of the building. SL Green used the proceeds from the ownership stake's sale to buy back some of its stock. After Viacom merged back into CBS Corporation in 2019, ViacomCBS (later Paramount Global (Note: The Paramount Global name took effect in early 2022.)) retained offices at One Astor Plaza. CBS News converted part of the MTV Studios space into a studio. Paramount Global subsequently occupied nearly all of the building's office space. Paramount Global fired hundreds of the building's employees in mid-2024. The mortgage loan on the building went into special servicing that October, but SL Green was able to extend the loan to avoid a default. Paramount Global began looking to sublease 103,000 square feet (9,600 m^{2}) at 1515 Broadway in 2025 after downsizing its workforce. Paramount merged with Skydance Media in 2025 to form Paramount Skydance Corporation, whose corporate headquarters were moved to Los Angeles.

==== Caesar's Palace Times Square proposal ====
Caesar's Palace Times Square
- Interactive map of Caesar's Palace Times Square
- Location: New York City, New York, United States
- No. of rooms: 992
- Gaming space: 250,000 sq ft (23,000 m^{2})
- Casino type: Resort
- Operating license holder: Caesars Entertainment
- Website: Official website

New York state officials announced in April 2022 that they would issue three casino licenses in Downstate New York. Following this announcement, SL Green proposed constructing a casino at 1515 Broadway to attract tourists; the casino would have 992 hotel rooms. In October 2022, SL Green and casino operator Caesars Entertainment jointly submitted a formal proposal for a casino in the building. The bid was also sponsored by Roc Nation and mayor Eric Adams's former chief of staff Frank Carone. Broadway theatrical trade association The Broadway League expressed opposition to the casino, while trade union Actors' Equity Association supported the plan. The project received support from 17 trade unions; the Wyndham Hotels & Resorts chain; the operators of the Sony Hall and Town Hall theaters; and local property owners.

If Caesars, SL Green, and Roc Nation received a casino license, SL Green chief executive Marc Holliday stood to earn $10 million. In addition, the partnership planned to spend $250 million on quality-of-life improvements to the surrounding neighborhood, including $5 million for the Callen-Lorde Community Health Center. It also planned to give $22.5 million to the West Side Community Fund and sell shares in the casino to small investors. The proposed casino resort would have had 992 hotel rooms and 250,000 square feet (23,000 m^{2}) of casino space. A slow environmental review process could have caused the proposed resort to be disqualified as final bids were due by June 2025, but SL Green has stated that they will meet the deadline for the completion of the environmental review. Caesar's submitted their bid for a commercial casino license on June 27, 2025. A few weeks later, renderings were released showing what the interior of the resort may look like if the bid is approved.

On September 17, 2025, a community advisory committee, appointed by the state government, voted against the proposed development. Holliday continued to advocate for a casino approval. The three licenses ultimately were granted to casinos in Queens and the Bronx, and Holliday instead began advocating to convert the building into an entertainment complex with a hotel. By 2026, the casino plan had been canceled; at the time, it was mostly occupied by Paramount Skydance.

== Reception ==
One Astor Plaza's construction had spurred developers to acquire several buildings around Times Square. When One Astor Plaza was completed, city officials had expressed hope that the building would precipitate the transformation of Times Square into an entertainment hub. This did not happen immediately, leading architectural writer Robert A. M. Stern to write that "Times Square somehow seemed all the more tawdry for its overscaled, underembellished corporate guest", One Astor Plaza. In 1985, New York Times architectural critic Paul Goldberger wrote that the under-construction Marriott Marquis hotel, One Astor Plaza, Paramount Plaza, and four planned towers at Times Square's south end (Note: Now 3 Times Square, 4 Times Square, 5 Times Square, and Times Square Tower) were "actively destroy[ing] something that is turning out to be far more fragile than we had once believed—that rough-and-tumble honky-tonk that is the physical essence of Times Square". After Caesars Entertainment's casino bid was announced, Karrie Jacobs of Curbed wrote in 2023: "It's fitting that 1515 Broadway, designed by architect Der Scutt (who later designed Trump Tower), was the leading edge of a '60s push to reinvent Times Square."

At an exhibition of New York City buildings in 1999, New York Times critic Herbert Muschamp said: "No one needs additional reason to dislike 1515 Broadway, the fin-topped office building between 44th and 45th Streets that replaced the legendary Astor Hotel." According to C. Ray Smith, the asymmetrical shafts of the facade were characteristic of "the new design" character of the 1970s, contrasting with previous symmetrical designs. Jo Mielziner said the large trusses above the Minskoff's roof provided "a clear example of what expense a builder is willing to go to get that extra rentable space".

== See also ==
- List of buildings and structures on Broadway in Manhattan
- List of tallest buildings in New York City
- List of tallest buildings in the United States
