= Henry H. Minskoff =

American real estate developer and philanthropist

- Born: May 27, 1911; New York City, New York
- Died: August 13, 1984 (aged 73); New York City, New York
- Occupation: real estate developer
- Spouse: Marjorie Folgeman
- Children: James Minskoff Sterling; Alan Minskoff; Jean Minskoff Grant
- Parent(s): Sam and Esther Minskoff

Henry H. Minskoff (May 27, 1911 – August 13, 1984) was an American real estate developer.

== Biography ==
Minskoff was born to a Jewish family in New York City the second of six children of Sam Minskoff and Esther Kernstein Minskoff, immigrants from Russia and Poland, respectively. He had four brothers: Leo, Jerome, Myron and Walter and one sister, Muriel. He grew up in the Bronx. He graduated from Lehigh University and then joined his father's real estate business he had founded in 1908. They went on to build dozens of office buildings, apartment buildings, and shopping malls in Manhattan, Queens, Westchester County, Baltimore, Philadelphia, and Detroit including 1 Astor Plaza on Times Square; the MGM Building, the Rolex Building, 250 Broadway, the Brevoort, Brevoort East, 710 Park Avenue, and 1 East 66th Street.

Minskoff was a member of the American Institute of Real Estate Appraisers; was a lecturer on real estate at New York University; served as director and vice chairman of Gemco National Inc., and as a director of both the Sterling National Bank and Trust Company and the Sterling Bancorp.

== Philanthropy and boardships ==
Minskoff served as president and chairman of the United Home for Aged Hebrews in New Rochelle, New York; and as the director of the Lexington School for the Deaf. He and his wife were founders of the Albert Einstein College of Medicine and benefactors of St. Mary's Hospital in Palm Beach, Florida. Minskoff also built the Sam and Esther Minskoff Cultural Center and the Park East Day School in Manhattan. The Minskoff Theatre is named after his father.

== Personal life ==
On November 17, 1935, Minskoff was married to Marjorie Folgeman; they had three children: James Minskoff Sterling; Alan Minskoff; and Jean Minskoff Grant. Services were held at Park East Synagogue in Manhattan. Minskoff Brothers was dissolved and in 2008, descendants of Henry, Jerome and Myron Minskoff filed suits against each other in Manhattan federal court over the company's assets. His son, Dr. James, (who changed his last name to Sterling), a psychologist, is married to Carolina Somoza, daughter of former Nicaraguan president Anastasio Somoza Debayle and Hope Portocarrero; and granddaughter of Anastasio Somoza Garcia.
