= Bryan–Chamorro Treaty =

1914 treaty giving the United States full control over any canal built through Nicaragua

The Bryan–Chamorro Treaty was signed between Nicaragua and the United States on August 5, 1914. It gave the United States full rights over any future canal built through Nicaragua. The Wilson administration changed the treaty by adding a provision similar in language to that of the Platt Amendment, which would have authorized military intervention in Nicaragua. The United States Senate opposed the new provision; in response, it was dropped, and the treaty was formally ratified on June 19, 1916. Eventually, the United States recognized that the canal was unlikely, and at the request of Nicaragua in 1970, the two nations officially abrogated the treaty and all its provisions.

== History ==
The reform-minded president José Santos Zelaya López (elected as a Liberal Party candidate) had incurred the wrath of the United States by negotiating with France, Germany, and Japan to resurrect the proposed Nicaragua Canal, which might constitute potential future foreign competition with the newly built, U.S.-owned Panama Canal. The United States then supported an insurgency against the government led by Conservative Party insurgents Emiliano Chamorro and Juan José Estrada, supplying them with arms, funds, troops, warships, and also imposing economic measures. This eventually forced the popular liberal Presidents José Zelaya and then Jose Madriz to flee the country. The US then installed the conservative governments of first Juan José Estrada (soon deposed by the powerful Secretary of War Luis Mena) and then former Vice President Adolfo Díaz.

When General Luis Mena convinced the National Assembly to name him successor to the unpopular pro-U.S. Adolfo Díaz, the United States invaded and occupied Nicaragua militarily from 1912 to 1933, wrote a new constitution for the country, changed the National Assembly, and propped up successive conservative regimes under the presidents Adolfo Díaz, Emiliano Chamorro, and Diego Manuel Chamorro. Luis Mena fled into the countryside to start a rebellion, which continued under various leaders for the next sixty years. In exchange for political concessions from Adolfo Díaz, the United States provided the military strength to suppress popular revolt and ensure the conservative regime maintained control over the Nicaraguan government. For much of the 20th century, Nicaragua remained controlled under the hereditary dictatorship of the Chamorro. After 1936, the Somoza dynasties were controlled until widespread rebellions forced them out of power in the 1970s.

The Treaty was named after the principal negotiators: William Jennings Bryan, U.S. Secretary of State, and the then General Emiliano Chamorro, representing the Nicaraguan government. By the terms of the treaty, the United States acquired the rights to any canal built in Nicaragua in perpetuity, a renewable 99 year option to establish a naval base in the Gulf of Fonseca, and a renewable 99-year lease to the Great and Little Corn Islands in the Caribbean. Nicaragua received $3 million for those concessions.

Most of the $3 million was paid back to U.S. creditors by U.S. officials in charge of Nicaraguan financial affairs, which allowed the Nicaraguan government to continue to collect internal revenue. The debt had been quickly amassed in a two-year period by the Nicaraguan government of Juan José Estrada under the American "dollars for bullets" scheme to retard infrastructure development funding from rival powers and lingering debts from earlier indemnities Nicaragua was forced to pay the foreign occupying powers of the United States and Great Britain, and repairing the devastation inflicted from the war with Great Britain, war with the United States and the civil war of Luis Mena's Rebellion.

The provision of the Bryan–Chamorro Treaty granting rights to the United States to build a naval base in the Gulf of Fonseca was contested by El Salvador and Costa Rica. The Central American Court of Justice favored the two countries. The United States ignored the decision, contributing significantly to the court's collapse in 1918.

Later, the United States recognized that a canal in Nicaragua parallel to the Panama Canal was increasingly unlikely.

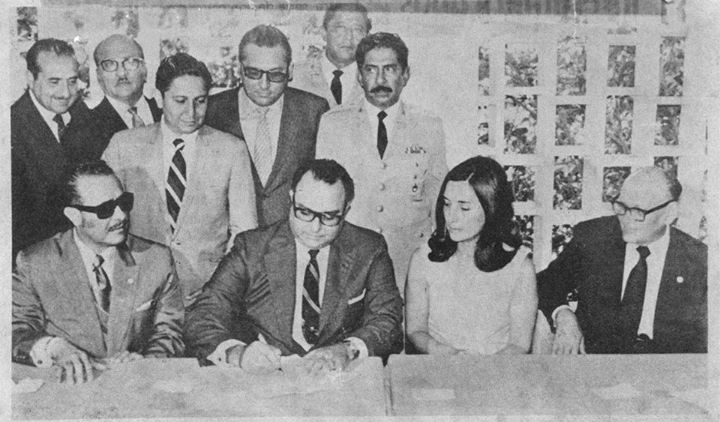
Abrogation of the Bryan-Chamorro Treaty, July 14, 1970, in Managua. Nicaraguan President Anastasio Somoza Debayle during a public ceremony held in the lobby of the National Palace, with his wife Hope Portocarrero and ministers of his government.

In 1970, at the request of Nicaragua, the United States under Richard Nixon and Nicaragua under Anastasio Somoza Debayle held a convention that officially abolished the treaty and all its provisions.

== Legacy ==
At various times since the Panama Canal opened in 1914, the Nicaragua route has been reconsidered. Its construction would shorten the water distance between New York and San Francisco by nearly 800 kilometers (500 mi). The Bryan–Chamorro Treaty kept Nicaragua from—and stopped any potential European powers from—competing with the Panama Canal.

== See also ==
- Nicaragua–United States relations
- Banana Wars
