= Battle of Masaya (1912) =

1912 battle in Nicaragua

- Part of the United States occupation of Nicaragua, Banana Wars, Nicaraguan civil war of 1912
- Battle of Masaya (1912) (Nicaragua)
| Date | 19 September 1912 |
| Location | Masaya, Nicaragua |
| Result | American victory |

Belligerents
| United States | Nicaraguan Rebels |

Commanders and leaders
| (United States) Smedley Butler | Benjamín Zeledón † |

Strength
| 400 marines & sailors 2 machine guns 2 guns" | 150 "armed horsemen" snipers (in buildings along the railroad track) |

Casualties and losses
| 6 wounded 3 captured (one of whom was slightly wounded) | 56–68 killed 60–70 wounded (12 of whom later died) |

The Battle of Masaya took place on 19 September 1912, during the American occupation of Nicaragua of 1912–1925 and the Nicaraguan civil war of 1912.

== Background ==
In the midst of a civil war in Nicaragua between the Conservative government and rebels, consisting of Liberals and dissident Conservatives, an expedition of 400 American Marines and sailors, plus "a pair of Colts and 3-inch guns," led by Smedley Butler was sent out to seize Granada from rebel forces. Traveling by train, Butler's forces reached the outskirts of Masaya, where they were threatened by rebels led by Benjamín Zeledón atop the hills of Coyotepe and Barranca. The Americans negotiated with Zeledón for safe passage past the two imposing hills.

== Battle ==
On the evening of 19 September 1912 the Americans continued their journey into the city of Masaya, with Butler, "legs dangling," sitting at the front of the train on a flatcar placed in front of the engine. The train had nearly gotten through the town, when, at Nindiri Station, the Americans were confronted by two mounted Nicaraguans. These two men, possibly drunk, opened fire with pistols, striking Corporal J. J. Bourne, who was next to Butler, in the finger. Butler had the train stopped, so a corpsman could be summoned to aid Bourne.

Before long, snipers in the houses on both sides of the railroad track and 150 "armed horsemen" began shooting at the American-occupied train. The U.S. forces, both inside the train and outside (taking cover alongside the roadbed), including the machine gunners on top of the boxcars, "returned fire." Three Marines, Private C. P. Browne, Private Ray Betzer, and Trumpeter W. M. Brown, were soon hit by fire from the Nicaraguan rebels. Meanwhile, the train's engineer had taken cover under his seat, and Butler had to get him out from that hiding spot. The most intense period of fighting lasted five minutes, "then [the firing] gradually died out."

The train now started picking up steam, leaving behind the Marines, led by Captain Nelson P. Vulte, who had sought refuge by the roadbed. These troops had to seize handcars and catch up with the train. In all, the battle lasted "less than half an hour."

During the firefight, five Americans were wounded and three captured (one of which was "slightly wounded") and soon released.

== Aftermath ==
Nicaraguan losses were either 56 killed outright and 70 wounded (12 of whom would later die) or 68 killed and 60 wounded. The day following the incident (September 20, 1912), Zeledón's emissary delivered apologies to the Americans, claiming that the attack was "unauthorized." However, the Masaya ambush, called "an act of treachery on the part of General Zeledón," was allegedly "premeditated" and "carefully planned." Butler's forces continued on to Granada, where they would convince rebel commander Luis Mena to surrender and go into exile in Panama. U.S. forces would later on in the civil war return to the Masaya area to storm Coyotepe hill.
