= National Congress of Nicaragua =

Former bicameral legislature of Nicaragua

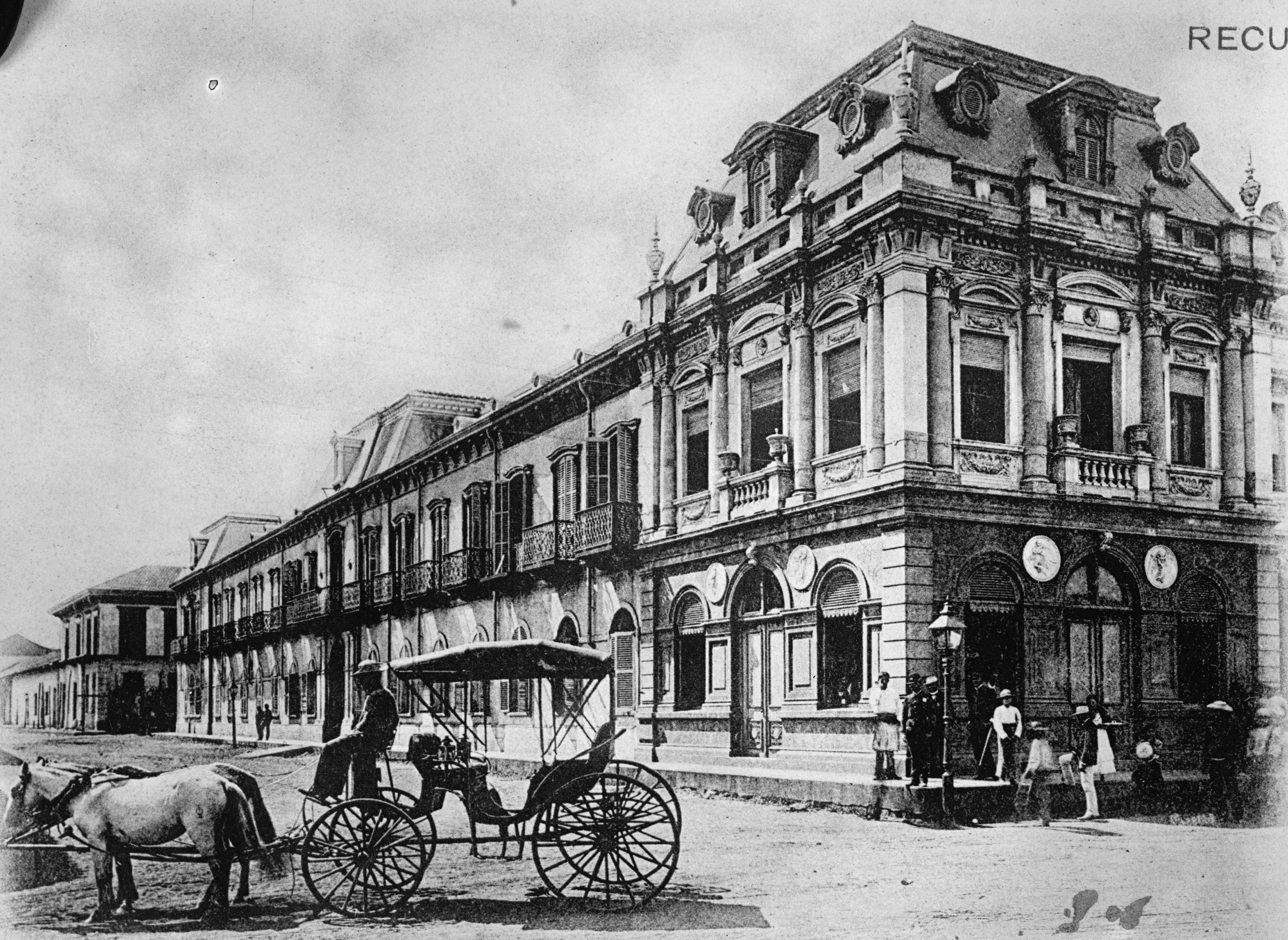
National Palace in early 1900s, the sitting place of the National Congress

The National Congress of Nicaragua (Spanish: Congreso Nacional) was the legislature of Nicaragua before the Nicaraguan Revolution of 1979.

The congress was bicameral, and consisted of Chamber of Deputies (Cámara de Diputados) and Senate (Cámara del Senado).

The Chamber of Deputies had 42 members (in 1968). They were popularly elected at-large, with one deputy for each 30 000 citizens. The Chamber of Deputies was the stronger chamber, all legislation was introduced there. The Senate was able block bills from the Chamber of Deputies with two-thirds majority.

The Senate had 18 senators (in 1968). There was one senator for each of the 16 national departments, and senators-for-life (former Presidents of the Republic), and one senator who was the runner-up in the latest presidential elections.

One-third representation of the major opposition party was guaranteed in both houses.

The congress met in the National Palace.

== Presidents of the Chamber of Deputies before 1979 ==
Name	Term	Notes
Pedro Solis	1838-1839	
Benito Rosales	1839-1841	
Brigadier Tomás Valladares	1841-1843	
Juan de Dios Orozco	1843-1845	
José León Sandoval	1845-1846	
Norberto Ramírez Áreas	1846	
Justo Abaunza Martínez	1846-1847	
Eduardo Castillo	1847-1848	
Pío José Bolaños Thomeu	1848	
General Ponciano Corral Acosta	1848-1849	
Rosalío Cortés Sánchez	1849	
José Laureano Pineda	1849	
Toribio Terán	1849-1852	
General Fulgencio Vega	1852-1853	
José León Sandoval	1853-1854	
José María Estrada	1854-1855	
Pedro Zeledón Mora	1855-1858	
Hermenegildo Zepeda Fernández	1858-1859	
José Antonio Mejia	1859-1860	
Colonel Agustin Avilez Alfaro	1860-1861	
Hermenegildo Zepeda Fernández	1861-1868	
Pedro Navas	1868	
Hermenegildo Zepeda Fernández	1868-1869	
General Pedro Joaquín Chamorro Alfaro	1869-1870	
José Argüello Arce	1870-1872	
Emiliano Cuadra	1872-1874	
Francisco Alemán	1874-1875	
Santiago Morales	1875	
Seferino González	1875-1877	
Francisco del Castillo	1877-1879	
Adán Cárdenas del Castillo	1879-1881	
General Pedro Joaquín Chamorro Alfaro	1881-1882	
Benjamin Guerra	1882-1883	
General Pedro Joaquín Chamorro Alfaro	1883	
José Francisco Aguilar Sacasa	1883-1885	
Adán Cárdenas del Castillo	1885-1886	
Adrián Zavala	1886-1887	
Salvador Castrillo	1887-1889	
Vicente Navas Fonseca	1889-1890	
Domingo Salinas	1890-1891	
Agustin Duarte	1891-1892	
Salvador Santana Romero	1892-1893	
Francisco Baca (hijo)	1893	
Fernando Sánchez Salinas	1893	
Francisco de Montenegro	1893-1896	
José Madriz Rodríguez	1896	
Celedonio Morales	1896	
José Madriz Rodríguez	1896-1905	
General Julián Irías	1905-1906	
Fernando Abaunza	1906-1909	
General Aurelio Estrada Morales	1909	
Santiago Argüello Barreto	1909	
José Madriz Rodríguez	1909-1910	
General Juan José Estrada	1910	
Manuel Maldonado	1910-1911	
José María Estrada	1911	
Ignacio Suárez	1911	
Adán Cárdenas	1911-1912	
Luís Correa	1912-1913	
Salvador Zamora	1913	
Salvador Chamorro	1913-1914	
Narciso Lacayo Lacayo	1914-1915	
General Miguel Cárdenas	1915	
César Pasos	1915-1917	
Hernán Jarquín	1917	
General Isidro Urtecho	1917	
Mariano Zelaya	1917-1918	
General Sebastián Uriza	1918	
Pedro González	1918-1923	
Eduardo Castillo C.	1923-1924	
General Alfonso Estrada	1924-1925	
Juan José Martínez	1925-1926	
Demetrio Cuadra Pasos	1926-1929	
Domingo Calero Blandino	1929-1931	
Francisco Baltodano	1931-1933	
Coronado Urbina	1933-1934	
Benjamín Lacayo Sacasa	1934	
Onofre Sandoval	1934-1935	
Simeón Rizo Gadea	1935-1936	
Humberto Alvarado	1936	
Carlos Alberto Brenes	1936	
Guillermo Sevilla Sacasa	1936-1937	
Fernando Sánchez Salinas	1937-1938	
Manuel Cordero Reyes	1938-1939	
Aurelio Montenegro	1939-1940	
Roberto González Dubón	1940-1944	
Aurelio Montenegro	1944-1946	
C. A. Bendaña	1946-1948	
Pedro J. Nuñez	1948	
Francisco Baltodano	1948-1950	
Mariano Argüello Vargas	1950-1952	
Manuel Fernando Zurita	1952-1953	
Luis Somoza Debayle	1953-1954	
Ulises Irías	1954-1955	
Luis Somoza Debayle	1955-1956	
Alejandro Abáunza Espinoza	1957-1959	
Aurelio Montenegro	1959	
Juan José Morales Marenco	1959–1961	
Orlando Montenegro Medrano	1961-1962	
Ulises Irías	1962-1963	
Juan José Morales Marenco	1963–1964	
Victor Manuel Talavera	1964-1965	
Orlando Montenegro Medrano	1965-1966	
José Maria Briones	1966-1967	
Adolfo Martínez Talavera	1967–1968	
Orlando Montenegro Medrano	1968-1969	
Orlando Tijerino Medrano	1969-1970	
Orlando Montenegro Medrano	1970–1972	
Cornelio H. Hüeck	1972–1976	
Orlando Montenegro Medrano	1976	
Luis Pallais Debayle	1976-1978	
Francisco Urcuyo Maliaños	1978–July 1979	

== Presidents of the Senate before 1979 ==
Name	Term	Notes
M. J. Cordero	1913–1914	
Pedro González	1914–1915	
José Demetrio Cuadra	1915–1916	
Sebastián Uriza	1916	
Pedro González	1916–1917	
Agustin Pasos	1917–1918	
Sebastián Uriza	1918–1922	
Hernán Jarquín	1922–1923	
José Demetrio Cuadra	1923–1924	
Gil Arévalo	1924–1925	
Federico Sacasa	1925–1926	
Sebastián Uriza	1926–1927	
J. Leopoldo Salazar	1927–1928	
José Demetrio Cuadra	1928	
J. Leopoldo Salazar	1928–1929	
Víctor Manuel Román y Reyes	1929–1930	
Francisco Paniagua Prado	1930–1931	
Leopoldo Ramírez Mairena	1931–1932	
Hildebrando A. Castellón	1932	
José Demetrio Cuadra	1932–1933	
Hildebrando A. Castellón	1933–1934	
Onofre Sandoval	1934–1935	
José D. Estrada	1935–1936	
Francisco Somarriba	1936	
José D. Estrada	1936–1939	
Onofre Sandoval	1939–1942	
José María Moncada	1942–1943	
Carlos A. Velázquez	1943–1944	
Carlos A. Morales	1944–1945	
Crisanto Sacasa	1945	
Onofre Sandoval	1945	
Mariano Argüello Vargas	1945–1946	
Juan José Martínez	1946–1947	
Mariano Argüello Vargas	1947–1948	
Pedro A. Blandón	1948–1949	
Lorenzo Guerrero	1949–1950	
Alberto Argüello Vidaurre	1950–1951	
Alejandro Abáunza Espinoza	1951–1952	
Mariano Argüello Vargas	1952–1953	
Lorenzo Guerrero	1953–1954	
Mariano Argüello Vargas	1954–1955	
Alejandro Abáunza Espinoza	1955–1956	
Mariano Argüello Vargas	1956–1957	
Lorenzo Guerrero	1956–1957	
Luis Manuel Debayle	1957–1958	
Alejandro Abáunza Espinoza	1958–1959	
Leonardo Somarriba	1959	
Pablo Rener	1959–1960	
Fernando Delgadillo Colé	1960–1961	
José María Zelaya Cardoza	1961–1962	
Lorenzo Guerrero	1962	
José María Zelaya Cardoza	1962–1963	
Mariano Argüello Vargas	1963	
José Frixione	1963	
Victor Manuel Talavera	1963–1964	
Adrián Cuadra	1964–1965	
Luis Arturo Ponce Sotomayor	1965	
Humberto Castrillo Morales	1965	
Luis Somoza Debayle	1965–1966	
Mariano Argüello Vargas	1966	
Pablo Rener	1966–1967	
Humberto Castrillo Morales	1967–1968	
Constantino Mendieta R.	1968–1969	
Cornelio H. Hüeck	1969–1970	
Gustavo F. Chávez	1970–1971	
Humberto Castrillo Morales	1971–1972	
Pablo Rener	1972–July 1979	

== Presidents of the Legislature during Federal Republic of Central America ==
Name	Term	Notes
Juan Manuel Zamora	1825	
Juan Argüello del Castillo	1825	
Francisco Reñasco	1825	
Gregorio Porras	1825-1826	
Pedro Muñoz	1826-1827	
Pío José Bolaños Thomeu	1827	
Manuel Mendoza	1827-1829	
José María Estrada	1829-1832	
José de Montenegro	1832-1833	
Evaristo Berríos	1833-1837	
Joaquin Barrios	1837-1838	
Pedro Aguirre	1838	

== See also ==
- National Assembly (Nicaragua) – Unicameral legislature since 1986
- History of Nicaragua
