= List of United States invasions of Latin American countries =

This list is a chronology of major U.S. military interventions and occupations in Latin American countries from the 1800s to the present. It covers direct military action by U.S. armed forces (not covert coups, indirect assistance of other fighting forces or other non-military interventions in the target country’s political processes). However, in many cases, the lines between these activities are blurred. The list of outright U.S. military incursions includes at least 15 operations of various sizes and durations:

== 19th century ==
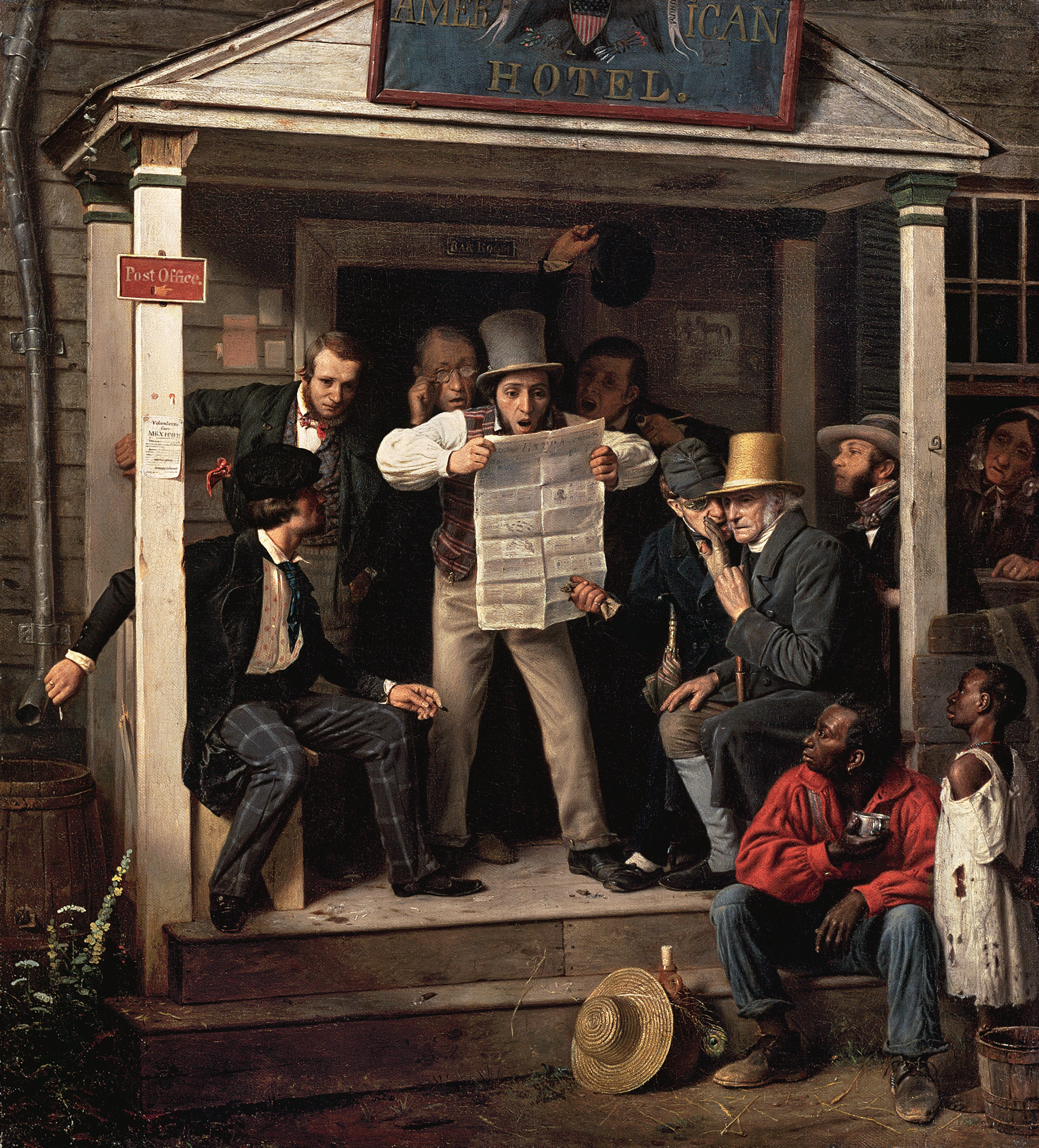
War News from Mexico (1848). The Mexican-American War was closely followed by Americans and was the first to be covered by American correspondents based abroad.

- 1846–1848 – Mexican-American War: U.S. forces invaded Mexico under President James K. Polk. The invasion followed the 1845 American annexation of Texas, which Mexico considered its territory because it refused to recognize the Treaties of Velasco, signed by President Antonio López de Santa Anna after he was captured by the Texian Army during the 1836 Texas Revolution. Mexico was forced to cede more than half its territory (including California and New Mexico) under the Treaty of Guadalupe Hidalgo.
- 1885 – Panama Crisis of 1885: This show of force involved an intervention by the U.S. navy during a rebellion in Panama. At the time, Panama was part of Colombia and the French had started building the Panama Canal. The U.S. sent its navy to keep order, invoking its obligations under the 1846 Mallarino–Bidlack Treaty. On 7 April 1885, the USS Shenandoah arrived in Panama City. Three days later, other American ships started arriving in Colón, Panama. On 27 April, a force of marines landed in Panama City to help suppress rebels who had taken over the city after local troops moved out to deal with a revolt in Colón. In response to the American intervention, Chile sent the Esmeralda to Panama City, arriving on 28 April. By the time the Esmeralda arrived in Panama, however, the conflict had already been resolved, with the U.S. withdrawing and the Colombian government retaking control of the city on 30 April.
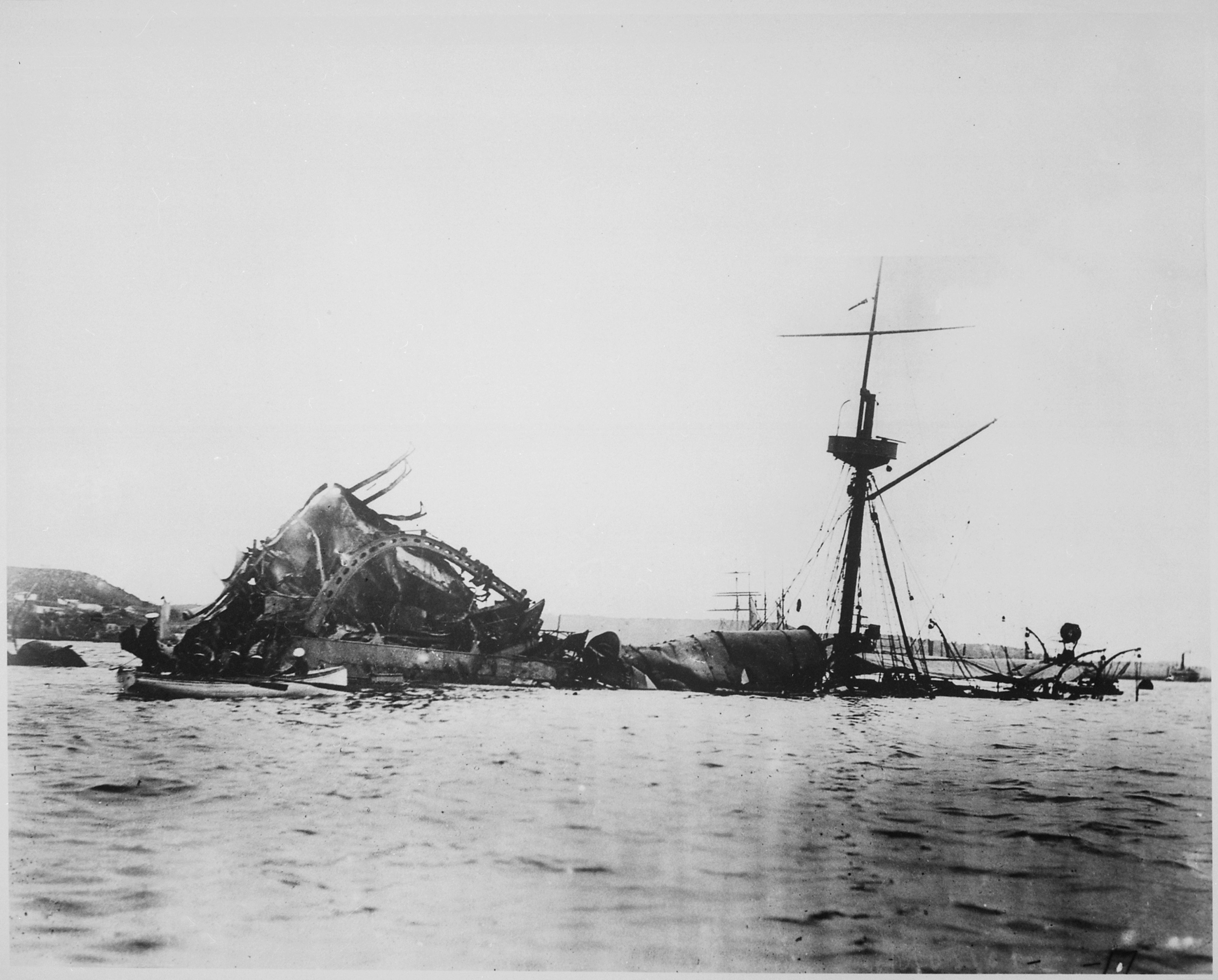
- The wreck of the USS Maine in Havana Bay in 1898
  1898 – Spanish-American War (Cuba/Puerto Rico) : This conflict with Spain began in February 1898 with the sinking of the USS Maine in Havana Harbor in Cuba. U.S. forces entered Cuba and Puerto Rico; Cuba was occupied and later became nominally “independent,” with the U.S. exerting heavy control via the Platt Amendment. The war formally ended with the 1898 Treaty of Paris, signed on December 10 with terms favorable to the U.S. The treaty ceded ownership of Puerto Rico, Guam, and the Philippines to the U.S., and set Cuba up to become an independent state in 1902, although in practice it became a U.S. protectorate.

== 20th century ==
- 1903 – U.S. support for the secession of Panama from Colombia: The U.S. backed Panama’s independence from Colombia to build and secure the Panama Canal Zone. This was not a full invasion but a decisive U.S. navy-backed political takeover. The U.S. sought to take over the canal project from the French, but the legislature of Colombia rejected a proposed treaty. Panama then declared independence from Colombia and negotiated a treaty granting the U.S. the right to construct the canal. The United States was the first country to recognize its independence, sending the U.S. Navy to prevent Colombia from retaking the territory. In exchange for its role in defending the Republic, and for building the canal, the U.S. was granted a perpetual lease on the land around the canal, known as the Panama Canal Zone.
- 1911–1912 – Occupation of Nicaragua: U.S. Marines occupied Nicaragua intermittently to protect U.S. geopolitical interests and suppress insurgents. Nicaragua assumed a quasi-protectorate status under the 1916 Bryan–Chamorro Treaty. On January 2, 1933, President Hoover ended this arrangement in accordance with the Good Neighbor policy, which favored non-intervention in the domestic affairs of Latin America. The last U.S. Marines left Nicaragua after Juan Bautista Sacasa's inauguration as the country's president.
- 1914 – Battle of Veracruz (Mexico): U.S. forces landed and occupied the Mexican port city of Veracruz for several months during the Mexican Revolution. The incident occurred in the midst of tensions between Mexico and the United States related to the ongoing Mexican Revolution. It began with an occupation in response to the Tampico Affair of April 9, 1914, where Mexican forces had detained nine American sailors.
- 1916–1917 – Pancho Villa Expedition (Mexico): The U.S. Army entered northern Mexico pursuing revolutionary leader Pancho Villa after his raid on the town of Columbus, New Mexico, an incident in the larger Mexican Border War. The U.S. response was a major cross-border military expedition. Despite locating and defeating the main contingent responsible for the Columbus raid, US forces were unable to prevent Villa's escape. The military expedition remained in Mexico until February 1917 to encourage Carranza's government to pursue Villa and prevent further raids across the border.
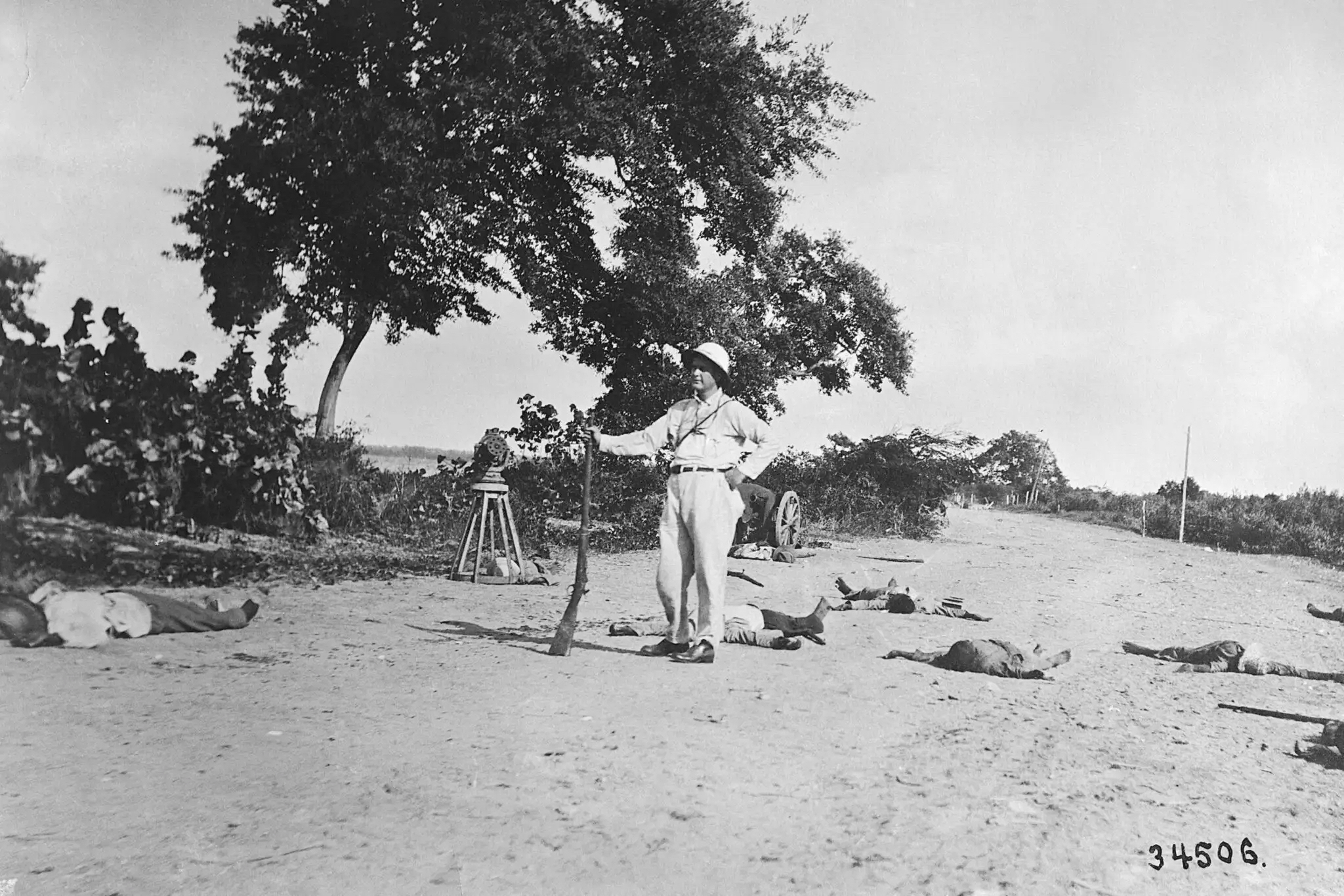
- American poses with dead Haitians killed by US Marine machine gun fire in 1915.
  1915–1934 – U.S. Occupation of Haiti: U.S. Marines occupied Haiti, controlling governance and finances to secure U.S. interests. The occupation began on July 28, 1915, when 330 U.S. Marines landed at Port-au-Prince, Haiti, after the National City Bank of New York (now Citibank) convinced U.S. President Woodrow Wilson to take control of the country's political and financial interests. A corvée system of forced labor was used by the U.S. for infrastructure projects, resulting in hundreds to thousands of deaths. The occupation abolished the constitutional ban on foreign ownership of land, which had existed since the foundation of Haiti. The occupation ended on August 1, 1934, after Franklin D. Roosevelt reaffirmed an August 1933 disengagement agreement.
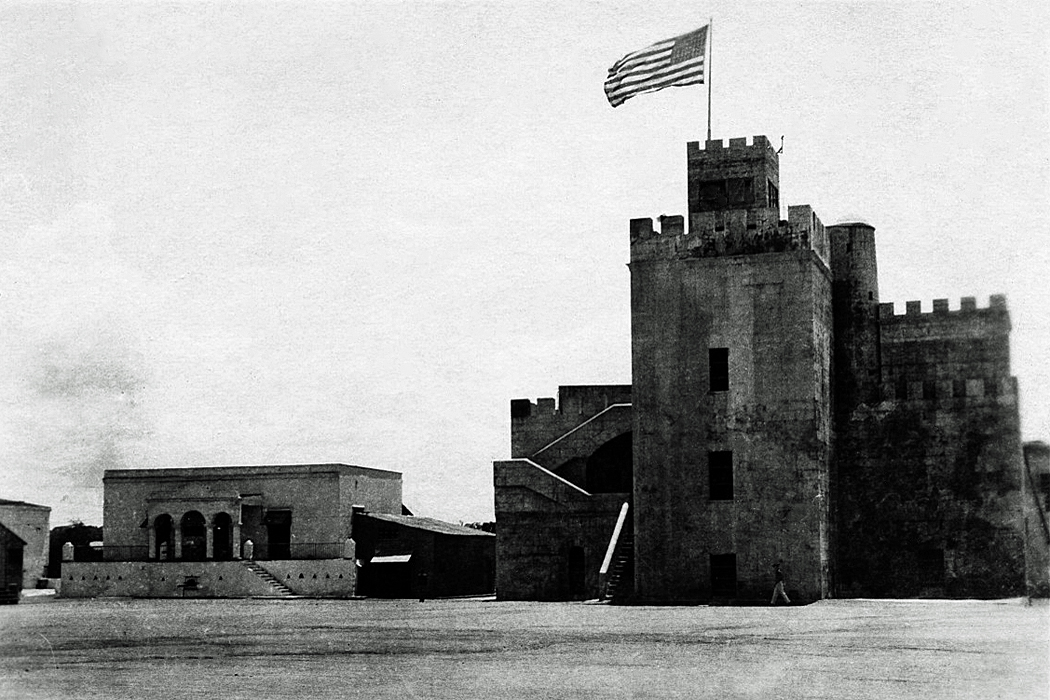
- The flag of the United States waving over Ozama Fortress in Santo Domingo, c. 1922
  1916–1924 – Occupation of the Dominican Republic : Marines occupied the country to consolidate U.S. influence. The U.S. aimed to force the Dominicans to repay their large debts to European creditors, whose governments threatened military intervention. On May 13, 1916, Rear Admiral William B. Caperton forced the Dominican Republic's Secretary of War Desiderio Arias to leave Santo Domingo by threats of naval bombardment. The Marines landed two days later and established effective control of the country within two months.
- Period of Gunboat diplomacy. There were also smaller landings and interventions in Honduras, Cuba, Panama, and other countries. These military actions were initiated mainly in support of US business interests.
- 1961 – Bay of Pigs Invasion (Cuba): A CIA-backed force of Cuban exiles – supported by U.S. aircraft and naval assets – invaded Cuba to overthrow Fidel Castro’s government; the invasion failed. The landing operation took place on the southwestern coast of Cuba in April 1961, at the height of the Cold War. Its failure influenced relations between Cuba, the United States, and the Soviet Union.
- A child hides under a jeep near American soldiers in Santo Domingo in 1965.
  1965 – Second invasion of the Dominican Republic; Operation Power Pack: Thousands of U.S. troops landed to intervene in a civil war, ostensibly to prevent a perceived communist takeover. The U.S. invasion later became an Organization of American States occupation by the Inter-American Peace Force.
- 1983 – Invasion of Grenada; Operation Urgent Fury: U.S. forces invaded to topple the revolutionary government and protect American citizens. Cuban workers and Soviet-aligned forces were expelled. The invasion was triggered by strife within the People's Revolutionary Government, which led to the house arrest and execution of the Prime Minister of Grenada and to the establishment of a Revolutionary Military Council. Following the invasion, an interim government was appointed, and general elections held in December 1984.
- 1989–1990 – Invasion of Panama; Operation Just Cause: U.S. forces invaded to depose Gen. Manuel Noriega, who was later extradited to the U.S. to face charges. The operation ended in late January 1990 with the surrender of Noriega. The Panama Defense Forces were dissolved, and President-elect Guillermo Endara was sworn into office.

== 21st century ==
- 2026 – Military operation in Venezuela; Operation Absolute Resolve: In early 2026, U.S. forces seized Venezuelan President Nicolás Maduro during a controversial military operation that was subsequently condemned by many governments as violating sovereignty and international law. The US Armed Forces bombed infrastructure across northern Venezuela to suppress air defenses as a special operations force attacked Maduro's compound in Caracas. Maduro and his wife, Cilia Flores, were flown to New York City by U.S. forces to face trial there.

== See also ==
- Banana Wars
- CIA activities by country
- Foreign interventions by the United States
- Assassinations and targeted killing by the CIA
- Latin America–United States relations
- Manifest Destiny
- Monroe Doctrine
- South American Long Peace
- United States involvement in regime change
