= José Dolores Estrada (politician) =

Nicaraguan politician

José Dolores Estrada Morales
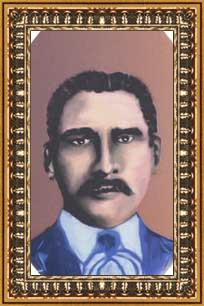

President of Nicaragua (Acting)
- In office 20 August 1910 – 27 August 1910
- Preceded by: José Madriz (Acting)
- Succeeded by: Luis Mena (Acting)

Personal details
- Born: José Dolores Estrada Morales; 16 January 1869 Villa El Carmen, Nicaragua
- Died: 6 April 1939 (aged 70) New York City, United States
- Party: Democratic Party
- Relatives: Juan José Estrada (Brother)
- Occupation: politician

José Dolores Estrada Morales (1869–1939), in the wake of the turmoil following José Santos Zelaya's fall, briefly served as acting President of Nicaragua for a week from 20 to 27 August 1910, before handing power to his brother, Juan José Estrada.

Estrada was the president of the upper chamber of National Congress of Nicaragua twice between 1935 and 1939. He died during a trip to New York in 1939.

Political offices
Preceded by José Madriz	President of Nicaragua; 1910	Succeeded by Juan José Estrada
