= Rener =

Rener is a surname and a given name. Notable people with the surname include:

- Pablo Rener, Nicaraguan politician
- Zvi Rener (1920–1990), Israeli politician
- Rener Gracie (born 1983), Brazilian-American martial artist and entrepreneur

== See also ==
- Renner
- Rehner
- Renier
