= Nicaragua–United States relations =

- Nicaragua: United States

Diplomatic mission
- Embassy of Nicaragua, Washington, D.C.: Embassy of the United States, Managua

Bilateral relations now exist between Nicaragua and the United States. However, in the 19th and 20th centuries, tensions were high and American intervention was frequent. In the 1980s, due to Red Scare paranoia and an attempt to put down communism and socialism in Latin America, the U.S proceeded to wage an unprovoked war against the left-wing Sandinista movement by funding the Contra groups until it was defeated in the election in 1990. With the re-election of Daniel Ortega in 2006, relations between the US and Nicaragua have been tense.

== History ==
The United States Marine Corps first landed in Nicaragua in 1852. According to Captain Harry Allenson Ellsworth, a Marine Corps historian, their presence was "for the protection of American lives and interests." One occasion was to protect an American mining company where workers were threatening a strike. Another time they just stayed long enough to burn down San Juan del Norte because – seven years earlier – the American minister to Nicaragua had been kept there overnight against his will before he was released just the following morning. Most Marine landings involved supporting one Nicaraguan faction against another.

=== Walker's 1855 filibustering ===
In the traditional historiography by historians in the United States and in Latin America, William Walker's filibustering represented the high tide of antebellum American imperialism. His brief seizure of Nicaragua in 1855 is typically called a representative expression of Manifest destiny with the added factor of trying to expand slavery into Central America. Historian Michel Gobat, however, presents a strongly revisionist interpretation. He argues that Walker was invited in by Nicaraguan liberals who were trying to force economic modernization and political liberalism. Walker's government comprised those liberals, as well as Yankee colonizers, and European radicals. Walker even included some local Catholics as well as indigenous peoples, Cuban revolutionaries, and local peasants. His coalition was much too complex and diverse to survive long, but it was not the attempted projection of American power, concludes Gobat.

=== 1909 Nicaragua revolution ===
In 1909, Zelaya was ousted from office in a rebellion led by conservative Juan José Estrada who was aided by the U.S. government.

=== American protectorate 1913 to 1933 ===
According to Benjamin Harrison, Wilson was committed in Latin America to the fostering of democracy and stable governments, as well as fair economic policies. Wilson was largely frustrated by the chaotic situation in Nicaragua. Adolfo Díaz won the presidency in 1911 and replaced European financing with loans from New York banks. Facing a Liberal rebellion, in 1913 he called on the United States for protection and President Woodrow Wilson obliged. Nicaragua assumed a quasi-protectorate status under the Bryan–Chamorro Treaty. Under the treaty Nicaragua promised it would not declare war on anyone, would not grant territorial concessions, and would not contract outside debts without Washington's approval. It permitted the US to build a naval base at Fonseca Bay, and gave the US the sole option to construct and control an inter-oceanic canal. The Panama Canal opened in 1914 and the US had no intention of building another canal, but wanted the guarantee that no other nation could do so. The US paid Nicaragua $3 million for this option. The original draft also asserted the duty of the United States to intervene militarily in case of domestic turmoil – but that provision was rejected by Democrats in the Senate. Nevertheless the US did send in Marines to protect the government and suppress local uprisings such as that of Augusto César Sandino after 1927. The treaty was extremely unpopular in the Caribbean region, but it was observed by both sides until 1933. Díaz was now able to serve out his entire term; he retired in 1917, and moved to the United States. (He returned briefly to power in 1926–1929). According to George Baker, the main effect of the treaty was a higher degree of both political and financial stability in Nicaragua. President Herbert Hoover (1929–1933) opposed the relationship. Finally in 1933 President Franklin D Roosevelt, invoking his new Good Neighbor policy ended American intervention.

=== World War II ===
The entry of the U.S. into World War II in December 1941 led Nicaragua to declare war on Japan, Germany and Italy. Nicaragua invited the U.S. to build naval and air bases in Nicaragua. Nicaraguan exports trebled in value during the war.

=== Nicaraguan Revolution ===
In the 1970s the FSLN began a campaign of kidnappings which led to national recognition of the group in the Nicaraguan media and solidification of the group as a force in opposition to the Somoza Regime, which ruled Nicaragua since 1937. The Somoza Regime, which included the Nicaraguan National Guard, a force highly trained by the U.S. military, declared a state of siege, and proceeded to use torture, extrajudicial killings, intimidation and censorship of the press in order to combat the FSLN attacks. This led to international condemnation of the regime and in 1978 the administration of U.S. president Jimmy Carter cut off aid to the Somoza regime due to its human rights violations (Boland Amendment). In response, Somoza lifted the state of siege in order to continue receiving aid.

=== Contra War ===
Upon their inauguration in January, 1981, the Reagan Administration supported a strong anti-communist strategy in Latin America. The CIA funneled logistical, military, and financial support to Contras in neighboring Honduras, waging a guerrilla war to topple the Sandinista Administration in Nicaragua. In 1984, the CIA's 'Unilaterally Controlled Latin Assets' (UCLA) mined many Nicaraguan harbors, leading to several Nicaraguan and foreign ships being damaged or sunk, and the passing of the Boland Amendment by US Congress. Though the Boland Amendment made it illegal, the Reagan Administration continued to fund and arm the Contras through the Iran-Contra affair.

In April 1984, Nicaragua submitted a case to the International Court of Justice, known as "Military and Paramilitary Activities in and against Nicaragua" or Nicaragua v. United States of America in response to the US actions . In 1986, the court ruled the United States as guilty, citing "The Court concludes that the United States of America, by training, arming, equipping, financing and supplying the contra forces, has acted, against the Republic of Nicaragua, in breach of its obligation under customary international law not to use force against another State." They demanded the United States cease their illegal operations and pay reparations to Nicaragua; however, the United States refused to comply. They instead continued its military action in Nicaragua without paying any reparations. In the United Nations, Nicaragua worked to submit a resolution to the United Nations Security Council in attempt to get the US to comply with the court's rulings. However, the US was the only country in the council to veto, on both July and October 1986, and due to the US being a Permanent 5 member, the resolution was not passed. This has added to the strain between Nicaragua and US relations, and Nicaragua still continues to criticize the US, with letters sent in 2023 and 2024 still demanding for the needed reparations.

In July 1988, the Sandinista government expelled US Ambassador Richard Melton and several embassy staff, prompting reciprocal actions by the United States. According to The New York Times, following Melton's expulsion, only personnel with "rudimentary Spanish" was left behind, complicating contacts between the embassy and opposition figures. During this time, the 40 members of the embassy were routinely followed around by Nicaraguan police officers, and, according to US officials, frequently stopped and harassed. A visa freeze for new US diplomats in Nicaragua was put in place from July 1988 to January 21, 1989, when US President George H. W. Bush was inaugurated.

In December 1989, in the aftermath of the United States invasion of Panama, the US embassy in Managua was encircled by Sandinista troops and T-55 tanks, in response to the United States doing the same to the Nicaraguan embassy in Panama. Despite the military buildup, the personnel of the US Embassy in Managua kept working as usual, with tensions cooling down the following day, when both Nicaragua and the United States reduced their military presence around each other's embassies in Managua and Panama City.

=== Recent history ===
After being condemned for terrorism, the U.S has aimed to support the consolidation of the democratic process in Nicaragua with the 1990 election of President Chamorro. The United States has promoted national reconciliation, encouraging Nicaraguans to resolve their problems through dialogue and compromise. It recognizes as legitimate all political forces that abide by the democratic process and eschew violence. U.S. assistance is focused on strengthening democratic institutions, stimulating sustainable economic growth, and supporting the health and basic education sectors.

Until recently, the resolution of U.S. citizen claims arising from Sandinista-era confiscations and expropriations still figured prominently in bilateral policy concerns. Section 527 of the Foreign Relations Authorization Act (1994) prohibits certain U.S. assistance and support for a government of a country that has confiscated U.S. citizen property, unless the government has taken certain remedial steps. After the Secretary of State had twenty times issued annual national interest waivers of the Section 527 prohibition, in August 2015 the U.S. Embassy in Managua announced a decision that the waiver was no longer needed, in a statement that included "The United States recognizes the work of the current government administration ‘to resolve pending claims in an expeditious and satisfactory manner.’"

Other key U.S. policy goals for Nicaragua are:

- Improving respect for human rights and resolving outstanding high-profile human rights cases;
- Developing a free market economy with respect for property and intellectual property rights;
- Ensuring effective civilian control over defense and security policy;
- Increasing the effectiveness of Nicaragua's efforts to combat trans-border crimes, including narcotics trafficking, money laundering, illegal alien smuggling, international terrorist and criminal organizations, and trafficking in persons; and
- Reforming the judicial system and implementing good governance.

Since 1990, the United States has provided over $1.2 billion in assistance to Nicaragua. About $260 million of that was for debt relief, and another $450 million was for balance-of-payments support. The U.S. also provided $93 million in 1999, 2000, and 2001 as part of its overall response to Hurricane Mitch. In response to Hurricane Felix, the United States provided over $400,000 in direct aid to Nicaragua to support recovery operations from the damage inflicted in September 2007. Aside from funding for Hurricanes Mitch and Felix, the levels of assistance have fallen incrementally to reflect the improvements in Nicaragua. Assistance has been focused on promoting more citizen political participation, compromise, and government transparency; stimulating sustainable growth and income; and fostering better-educated and healthier families. The Millennium Challenge Corporation signed a 5-year, $175 million compact with Nicaragua on July 14, 2005. The Millennium Challenge Compact is intended to reduce poverty and spur economic growth by funding projects in the regions of León and Chinandega aimed at reducing transportation costs and improving access to markets for rural communities; increasing wages and profits from farming and related enterprises in the region; and increasing investment by strengthening property rights.

In June 2026, the United States imposed visa restrictions on more than 100 Nicaraguan officials and their family members. Secretary of State Marco Rubio said the measures were announced following the death of Brooklyn Rivera, an Indigenous opposition leader and head of the Yatama movement. According to the U.S. Department of State, the restrictions targeted officials associated with the government of Daniel Ortega and Rosario Murillo. Announcing the measures, Rubio described the "Murillo-Ortega dictatorship" as "an enemy of humanity" and said the Trump administration would not ignore its alleged role in Rivera's death.

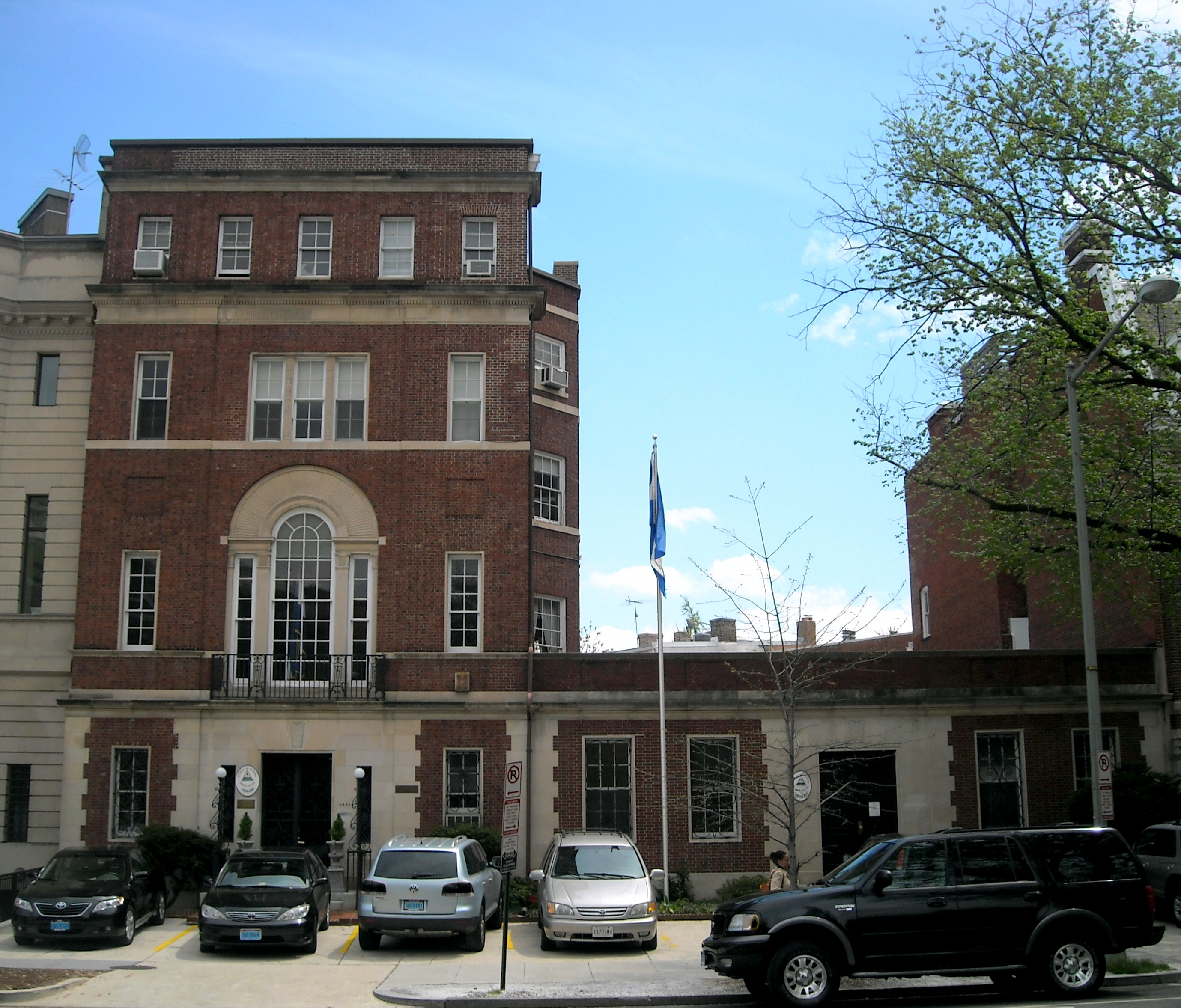
Embassy of Nicaragua in Washington, D.C.

=== NICA Act ===
In 2016, the Nicaragua Investment Conditionality Act of 2016 (NICA) was passed by the United States House of Representatives. It was unable to be approved by the Senate or the president due to the 2016 presidential election. The bill would, as a response to the alleged election fraud committed by president Daniel Ortega during the 2016 election, prevent Nicaragua from taking additional loans until they are willing to "[take] effective steps to hold free, fair and transparent elections." The bill was reintroduced to the House of Representatives again during a new session in 2017.

The Nicaraguan government and every single political party (including those who originally voiced concern over the election) opposed this bill, with Nicaraguan Vice President Rosario Murillo calling it a “reactionary and interventionist" action that would “undermine the right of Nicaragua to continue developing the socialist model.”. All ALBA member states are opposed to the bill. An international group of prominent trade unionists have also voiced their opposition to the bill by signing a solidarity statement in support of the Government of Nicaragua:

On December 20, 2018, U.S. President Donald Trump signed the NICA Act into law after it was unanimously approved by Congress. This enactment comes eight months after the beginning of the 2018–2021 Nicaraguan protests.

=== School of the Americas and Fr. Roy Bourgeois ===
In 1987, United States Senator Bob Dole visited Managua and criticized President Daniel Ortega for two of Nicaragua's political prisoners. Ortega offered to free the two political prisoners, who were opposition lawyers, in exchange for the freedom of the founder of School of the Americas Watch, Roy Bourgeois.

In 2012, Nicaragua ended relations with the School of the Americas, refusing to send any more trainees to the institute. In a news release, it stated that the School of the Americas has victimized Nicaragua (likely referring to the Contras, who were trained at the institute).

== See also ==
- Foreign relations of Nicaragua
- Foreign relations of the United States
- Embassy of Nicaragua, Washington, D.C.
- Embassy of the United States, Managua
- Ambassadors of the United States to Nicaragua
- Latin America–United States relations
- U.S. support for the Contras
- CIA activities in Nicaragua
