= Vigoroux =

Vigoroux is a surname. Notable people with the surname include:

- Eduardo Castillo Vigouroux, (born 1950), Chilean politician
- Lawrence Vigouroux (born 1993), Chile international footballer
