= Luis Pallais Debayle =

Luis Pallais Debayle (born in 1930) is a Nicaraguan Somoza-era politician and cousin of President Anastasio Somoza Debayle. He was a close collaborator of Somoza.

Pallais was born in 1930 in the city of León, as a son of lawyer Noel Ernesto Pallais and Margarita Debayle Sacasa. He graduated from a US institution as an engineer, but never practiced his profession. After the graduation, he returned to Nicaragua, and the Anastasio Somoza Debayle appointed him as director of the family newspaper Novedades, which he led until the end of Nicaraguan Revolution.

Pallais was also spokesperson of the Nationalist Liberal Party. He was later elected to the National Congress of Nicaragua, and elected president of the Chamber of Deputies of National Congress from 1976 to 1978. He was one of the deputies kidnapped in Commander Edén Pastora's successful Operation Chanchera to storm the National Palace on 22 August 1978.

Pallais was with Anastasio Somoza Debayle until the last moments of Nicaraguan Revolution in July 1979, when he hastily left the country on the same plane as Somoza. He relocated to Miami He married first Thelma Sevilla, and later Nadia Leets (Miss Nicaragua International), with whom he has had several children, who are reportly living in exile in Miami.
