= Gregorio Juárez =

President of Nicaragua

Gregorio Juárez was the 35th President of Nicaragua; he ruled from 19 October to 15 November 1857, jointly with Rosalío Cortés in a government junta.
