= Eduardo Castillo =

Eduardo Castillo may refer to:

- Eduardo Castillo Pino (born 1970), Ecuadorian prelate of the Roman Catholic Church, archbishop of Portoviejo since 2019
- Eduardo Castillo Vicuña (1861–1930), Chilean judge and politician
- Eduardo Castillo Vigouroux (born 1950), Chilean lawyer and politician

== See also ==
- Eduardo del Castillo (born 1988), Bolivian lawyer and politician
