= Cornelio Hüeck =

Nicaraguan politician (died 1979)

Cornelio Hendrik Hüeck Salomón (died in 1979) was a Nicaraguan politician and an ardent Somoza supporter from Nationalist Liberal Party.

Hüeck was President of the Senate of National Congress of Nicaragua from 1969 to 1970. In 1972 he became the secretary of Liberal-Conservative Junta. He was President of the Chamber of Deputies of National Congress of Nicaragua from 1972 to 1976, and in this position he was the second-in-line to succeed Anastasio Somoza Debayle because vice presidency was abolished in 1972. Hüeck was purged from the position of power by Somoza.

It has been alleged that he was executed in 1979 following the Nicaraguan Revolution. His body was buried fifteen years later in August 1994.
