= Rosalío Cortés =

Former President of Nicaragua

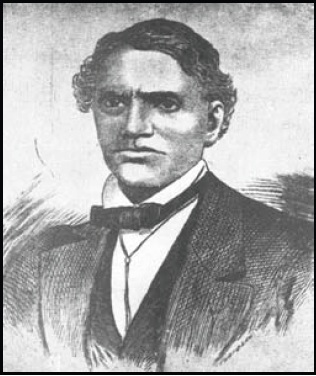
Rosalío Cortés Sánchez

Rosalío Cortés Sánchez (1820–1884) was the 35th President of Nicaragua, serving from 19 October to 15 November 1857; he ruled jointly with Gregorio Juárez in a government junta.

Cortés was born in 1820 in León, Nicaragua and died in 1884 in Masaya. He was president of the Nicaraguan Congress in 1849. He and Juárez, both Afro-Nicaraguans from León, were the most trusted advisors to General, and later President, Tomás Martínez, who succeeded them in the presidency.
