= Battle of Coyotepe Hill =

1912 battle during the US occupation of Nicaragua

Coordinates: 11.995°N 86.097°W

- Part of the Nicaraguan civil war (1912), Occupation of Nicaragua, Banana Wars
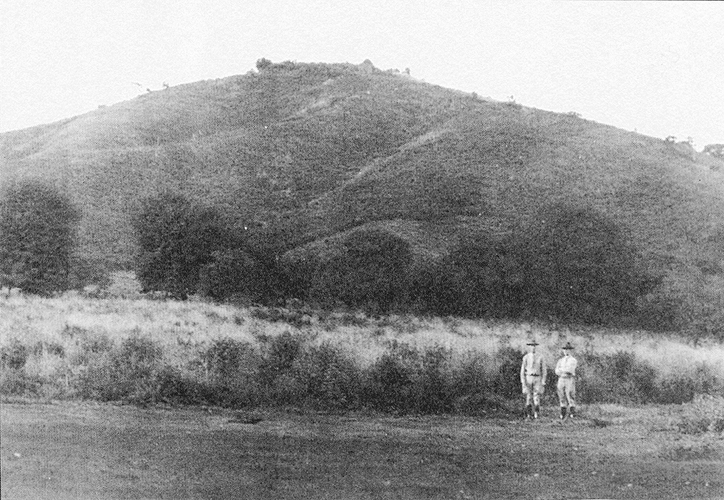
- Two Marines with Coyotepe Hill in the background in October 1912.
Date	3–4 October 1912
Location	near Masaya, Nicaragua
Result	American victory

Belligerents
United States	Rebels

Commanders and leaders
(United States) Joseph H. Pendleton (United States) Smedley Butler	Benjamín Zeledón

Strength
850 marines 100 sailors 2 artillery pieces	350 militia 4 artillery pieces 2 forts

Casualties and losses
4 killed 10 wounded	32 killed

The Battle of Coyotepe Hill was a significant engagement during the United States occupation of Nicaragua from August through November 1912 during the insurrection staged by Minister of War General Luis Mena against the government of President Adolfo Díaz.

Coyotepe is an old fortress located on a 500-foot hill overlooking the strategic railroad line near Masaya roughly halfway between Managua and Granada, Nicaragua.

== Battle ==
On 2 to 4 October 1912, a Nicaraguan rebel force led by General Benjamín Zeledón occupying Coyotepe and another hill, Barranca fort, overlooking the strategic rail line, refused to surrender to government troops under President Adolfo Díaz. U.S. Marine Major Smedley Butler's Marine battalion, with whom Zeledón's rebels had skirmished on September 19, returned from its capture of Granada, Nicaragua on 3 October and shelled the rebel stronghold on Coyotepe.

During pre-dawn hours on 4 October Butler's battalion, in concert with two Marine battalions and one from the USS California led by Marine Colonel Joseph H. Pendleton converged from different positions to storm the hill and capture it. Zeledón was killed during the battle, probably by his own men.

== Aftermath ==
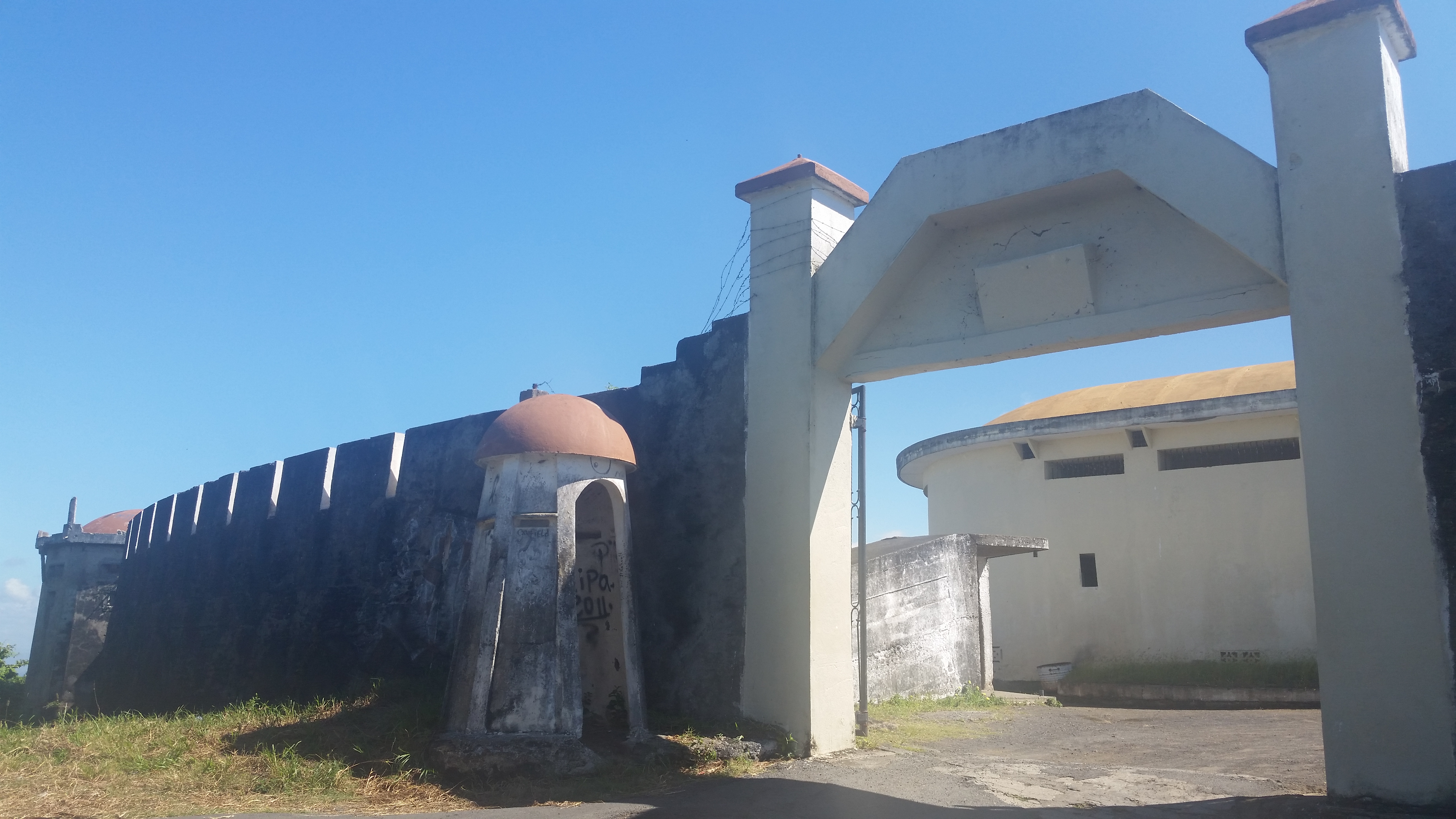
Coyotepe Fortress entrance

With the capture of León, Nicaragua two days later by U.S. Marines and the recapture of Masaya by Nicaraguan government troops, the Nicaraguan revolution of 1912 was essentially over. During the Somoza dictatorship the fortress was used as a prison. Occasionally dissidents imprisoned there would be taken from the fortress in a helicopter and dropped into a nearby volcano.

== See also ==
- Battle of Fort Dipitie
