= Benjamín Zeledón =

Nicaraguan politician (1879–1912)

Benjamín Francisco Alexander
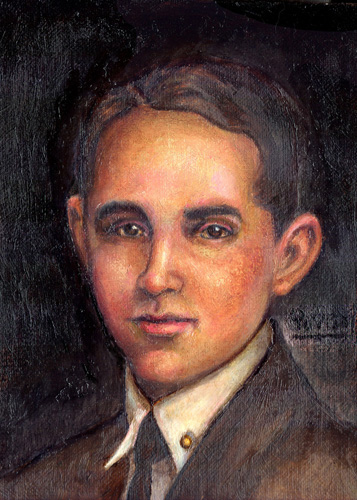
- Born: October 4, 1879; La Concordia, Jinotega, Nicaragua
- Died: October 4, 1912 (aged 33); Catarina, Masaya, Nicaragua
- Occupation: Lawyer
- Military career
- Allegiance: Nicaragua
- Service years: 1907 – 1912
- Rank: General
- Conflicts: Battle of Namasigüe, Battle of Masaya
- Awards: National Hero of Nicaragua

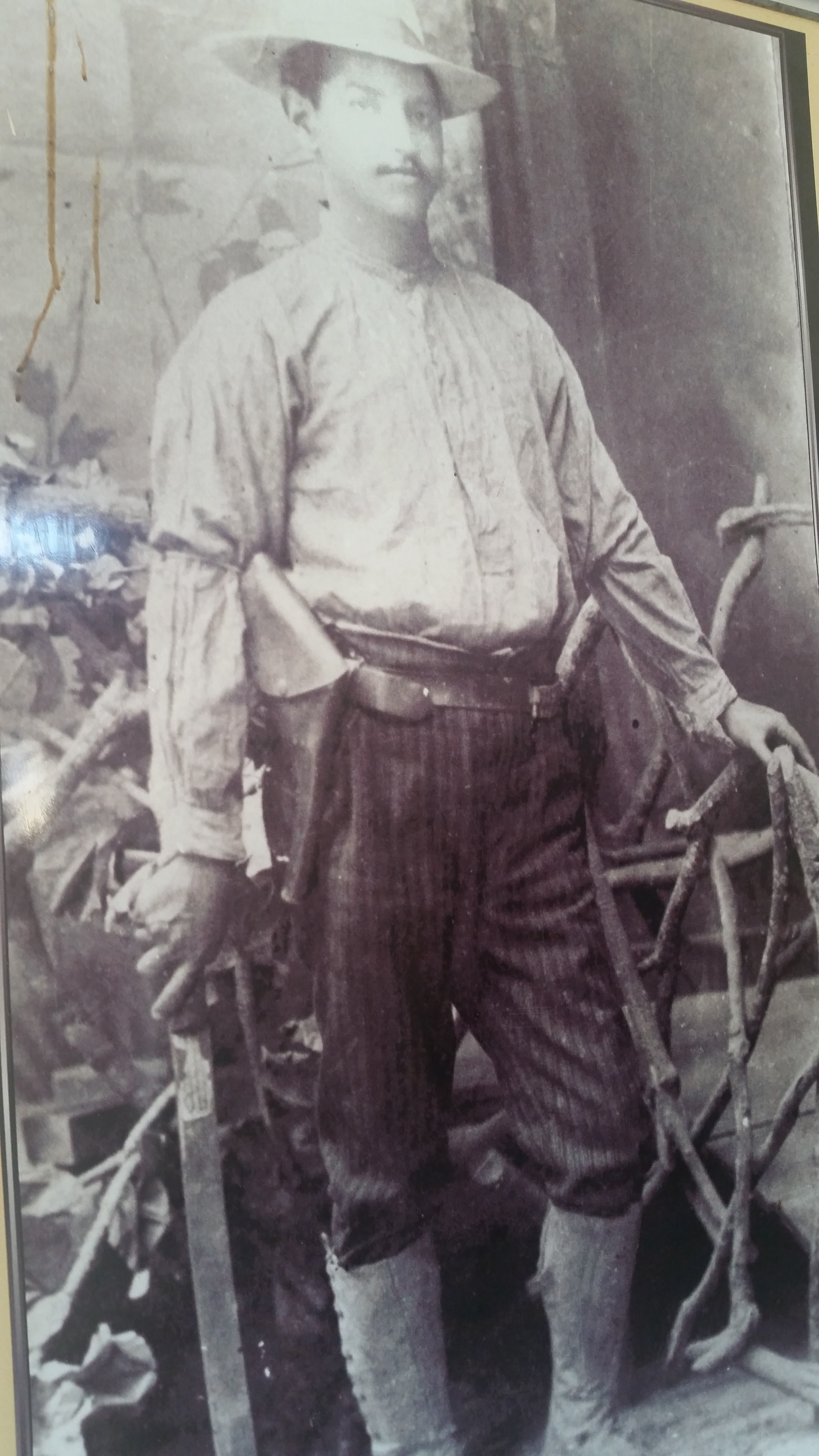
General Benjamin Zeledon image in the Coyotepe Fortress historical marker

Benjamín Francisco Zeledón Rodríguez (October 4, 1879 – October 4, 1912) was a Nicaraguan lawyer, politician and soldier known under the posthumous title of "National Hero of Nicaragua".

He was born on 4 October 1879 in Jinotega Department to Don Marcelino Zeledón Ugarte and Doña Maria Salomé Rodriguez. After receiving a bachelor's degree in Tegucigalpa, he returned to Nicaragua in 1900 and received a law degree in 1903. In 1905 he married Esther Ramírez Jerez. He was promoted to colonel on 9 Aug. 1907 after the Battle of Namasigüe.

== Liberal-Conservative Revolution 1912 ==
He was one of the leaders of an uprising against President Adolfo Díaz. His rebel forces opened fire on American Marines and sailors at Masaya on September 19, 1912. After the surrender of General Luis Mena on September 23, Zeledón assumed the supreme command of the Revolution thus became Supreme Leader of the Government in rebellion. He was killed during the Battle of Coyotepe Hill, when United States Marines recaptured Fort Coyotepe and the city of Masaya from rebels. His body was carried on an oxcart by the Marines to be buried in Catarina. This image greatly impacted future Nicaraguan revolutionary Augusto César Sandino.

Political offices
Preceded by Luis Mena	President of Nicaragua (rebel); 23 September 1912 - 4 October 1912	Succeeded by Emiliano Chamorro Vargas
