= Pablo Rener =

Nicaraguan politician

Pablo Rener Valle is a Nicaraguan politician and an ardent Somoza supporter and treasurer of the Nationalist Liberal Party, and the last President of the Senate of Nicaragua in July 1979.

Rener is of German origin. He was President of the Senate of National Congress of Nicaragua from 1959 to 1960, from 1966 to 1967, and from 1972 until July 1979, when Somoza was toppled in the Nicaraguan Revolution.

In July 1979, Somoza was allegedly ready to resign in favor of Rener, who at that time was the President of the Senate. However, Rener fled alongside Somoza to Florida, United States.
