= Vicente Navas Fonseca =

Nicaraguan statesman and education reformer (1837–1892)

Vicente Navas Fonseca (1837 – 1892) was a Nicaraguan statesman, educator, and government minister, remembered for his role in advancing Nicaragua's public education system and for his cultural and political influence during the 19th century. Notably, he was President of the Chamber of Deputies of Nicaragua from 1889-1890. He was a member of the Conservative Party of Nicaragua.

== Early life and career ==
Navas Fonseca was born in 1837 in León, Nicaragua to Rafael Navas and Cesaria Fonseca. Details of his early life are limited, but he rose to national prominence during a period of liberal reform in Nicaragua. He served as a government minister, actively engaged in the promotion of public education and cultural development.

Under Joaquín Zavala's rule he received criticism for his aide in expelling Jesuits from León. Navas is referenced as appearing late to the conference held by Central American leaders regarding if the entry of the Jesuits should be allowed. By the time of his arrival the other leaders already came to an agreement.

One of his most significant contributions was the recruitment of European professors to teach in Nicaragua, part of a broader liberal effort to modernize state institutions along secular and scientific lines. Navas was successful in getting Salvador Calderón y Arana to teach in León.

== Death and national mourning ==
Vicente Navas Fonseca died on October 4, 1892 in Paris, France, while engaged in diplomatic or academic matters. News of his death was reported in the Costa Rican newspaper Prensa Libre, which published an article on October 17, 1892 noting his passing and prominent role in Nicaraguan public life.

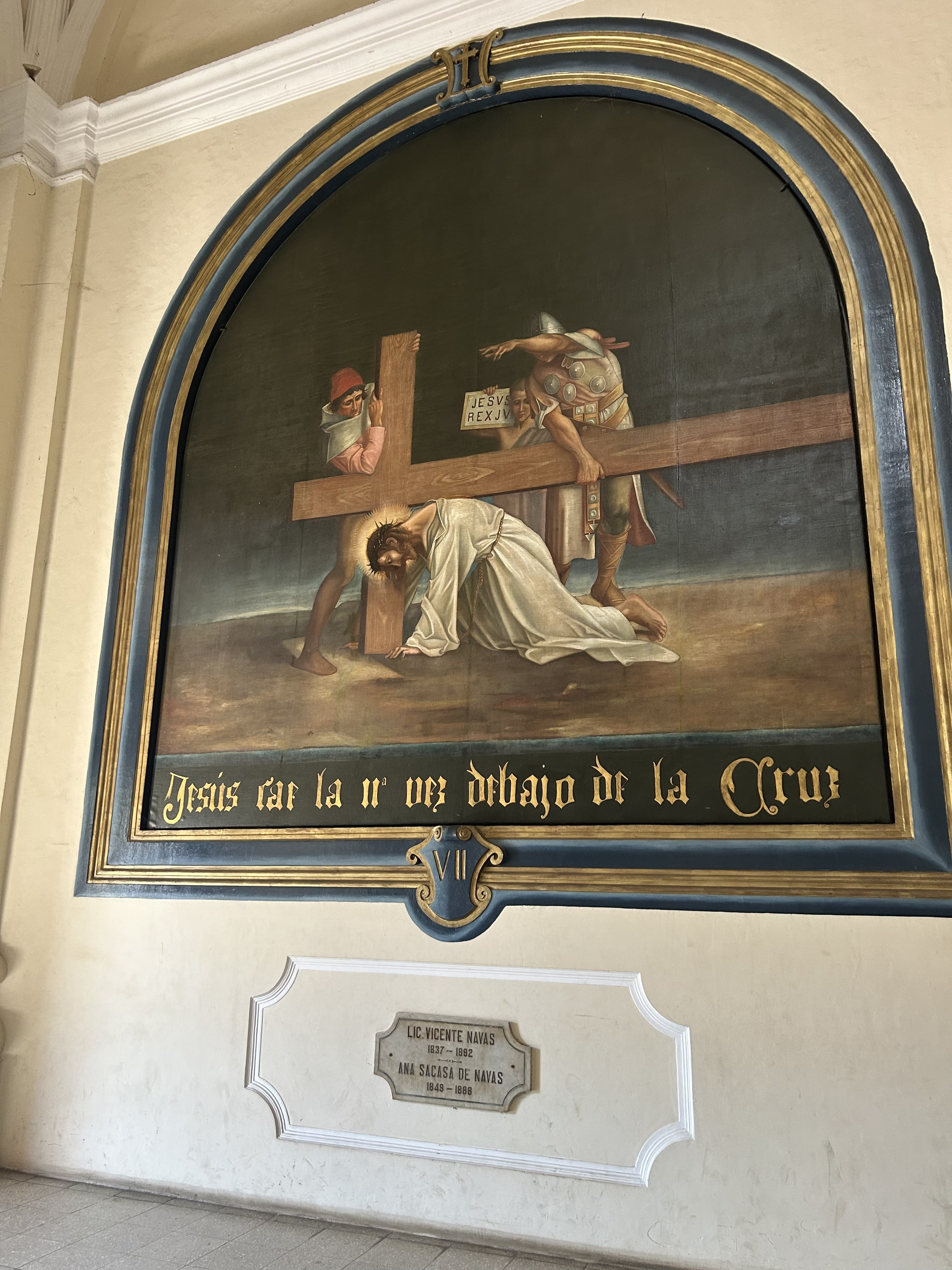
Buried under the seventh painting of the Via Crucis collection is Vicente Navas Fonseca. Also, his 2nd wife Ana Sacasa Sarria.

In recognition of his service, the Nicaraguan government declared a period of national mourning and financed the repatriation of his remains from Paris. He was buried with full honors in the Cathedral of León, a site reserved for national figures. His plaque can be found under the seventh painting out of the collection of 14 parts of the Via Crucis which was created by the Nicaraguan artist Antonio Sarria. He is buried alongside his second wife, Ana Sacasa Sarria, 1849-1888. She was the sister of Nicaraguan president Roberto Sacasa.

== Friendship with Rubén Darío ==
The poet Rubén Darío, a celebrated literary figure in the Spanish-speaking world, wrote a public eulogy for Navas Fonseca. The poem was delivered at a commemorative ceremony at the National Autonomous University of Nicaragua at León and later published in the newspaper El Monitor Occidental. A scanned copy of the original text is preserved in the Biblioteca Virtual Miguel de Cervantes. Darío was interrupted while giving the eulogy, in this moment he received news of his wife's state of health. He left and was unable to finish his reading of the eulogy. This showcases the complexity of their friendship, Navas once even tried to arrest Darío. Navas had called Darío's writing of poetry as a form of laziness.

Fidelina Santiago de Castro shared her first hand account about Darío's attendance at a party which took place on March of 1884. This party was thrown in honor of Navas Fonseca's return from his diplomatic duties in Costa Rica.

== Legacy ==
Navas Fonseca's efforts to reform Nicaraguan education and government made him have regard among political and literary figures, earning him a place among the country's respected historical figures. His burial in León Cathedral and the tribute by Rubén Darío reflect the esteem in which he was held at the time of his death.

== See also ==
- Education in Nicaragua
- Rubén Darío
- Cathedral of León (Nicaragua)
