= 3-inch gun =

A 3-inch gun is a gun with a 3-inch bore. Examples include:

- 3-inch M1902 field gun also M1904, M1905
- 3-inch gun M1903 - US coast defense gun, also M1898, M1902 seacoast gun
- 3"/50 caliber gun - US dual purpose naval gun
- 3"/23 caliber gun - US dual purpose naval gun
- QF 3 inch 20 cwt - British anti-aircraft gun
- 3-inch Gun M1918 - US anti-aircraft gun
- 3-inch Gun M5 - US anti-tank gun
