= National Palace of Culture, Managua =

Historic building in Managua, Nicaragua

Coordinates: 12.1555°N 86.2721°W

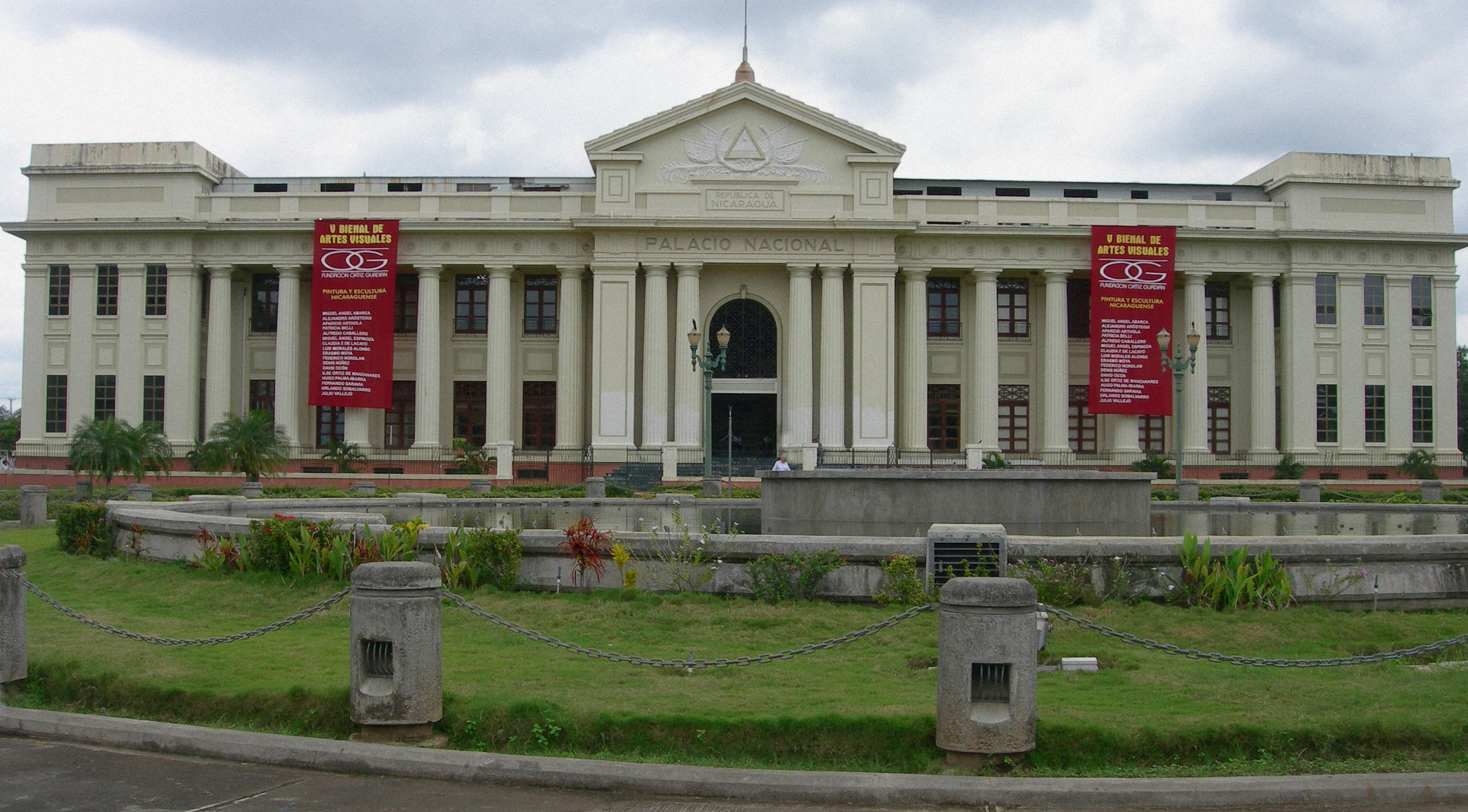
The National Palace in 2011.

The National Palace of Culture (Spanish: Palacio de la Cultura) is one of the oldest buildings in Managua, the capital city of Nicaragua. It is home to the country's national museum and art gallery, hosting works of artists Arnold Belkin, Armando Morales and Leoncio Saénz. The Nicaraguan Institute of Culture is housed within the same building.

== History ==
It was commissioned by President Juan Bautista Sacasa in 1935 and built by architect Pablo Dambach, who also built the St. James Cathedral. For more than 50 years, the National Palace housed the National Congress of Nicaragua. Today, it houses the National Archive, the National Library, as well as the National Museum which is open to the public. The museum features pre-Columbian paintings, statues, ceramics, etc. Also part of the exhibit is the Hall of National History and the Hall of National Symbols. The National Palace was one of the few buildings that survived the 1972 earthquake.

== Events ==
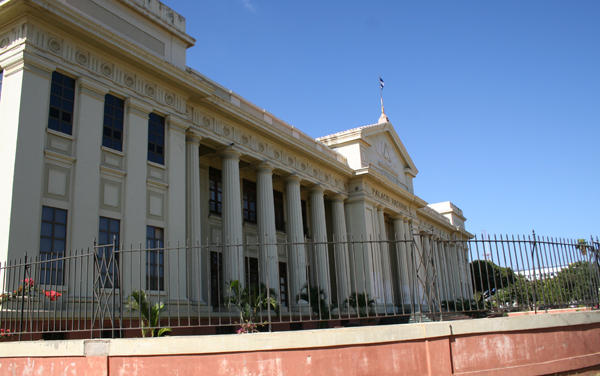
Façade of the palace in 2007.

- On 5 December 1950, the wedding procession of Anastasio Somoza Debayle and his cousin Hope Portocarrero left the palace lobby for the Old Cathedral of Managua to get married.
- 22–24 August 1978: During the Nicaraguan Revolution, Sandinista rebels led by Eden Pastora seized the National Palace in Managua while during a session of Congress, taking 2,000 hostages. Pastora demanded money, the release of Sandinista prisoners, and, "a means of publicizing the Sandinista cause." After two days, the government of Anastasio Somoza Debayle agreed to pay $500,000 and to release certain prisoners, ending the siege.

== See also ==
- Palace of Culture
