= Eduardo Castillo Vigouroux =

Chilean lawyer (born 1950)

Eduardo Castillo Vigoroux
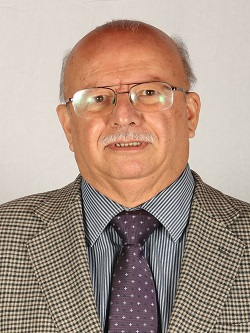

Member of the Constitutional Convention
- In office 4 July 2021 – 4 July 2022
- Constituency: 23rd District

Personal details
- Born: 25 June 1950 (age 76) Santiago, Chile
- Party: Party for Democracy
- Education: University of Chile (LL.B); Temuco Catholic University (LL.M)
- Profession: Lawyer

Eduardo Castillo Vigouroux (born 25 June 1950) is a Chilean lawyer, academic, and politician affiliated with the Party for Democracy (PPD).

He served as a member of the Constitutional Convention, representing the 23rd electoral district of the Araucanía Region. He previously served as a municipal councillor of Temuco (1992–1996) and Padre Las Casas (1996–2004), and acted as coordinator of the Convention’s Transitional Provisions Committee.

In 2013, he was appointed as dean of the Faculty of Law of the Temuco Catholic University.

== Biography ==
Castillo Vigoroux was born on 25 June 1950. He is the son of Salustio Javier Castillo López and Estela Evencia Vigouroux Meneses.

He completed his secondary education at Colegio San Ignacio in Santiago. He studied law at the University of Chile, qualifying as a lawyer in 1979. He later obtained a Master’s degree in Constitutional Law from the Temuco Catholic University (UCT) and holds a postgraduate diploma in Applied Political Science from the University of Chile.

Professionally, he has worked at the Vicariate of Solidarity of the Archdiocese of Santiago, the Indigenous Institute Foundation of the Diocese of Temuco, and as head of legal affairs of the Regional Government of Araucanía. He has also been affiliated with human rights organizations such as the Chilean Commission of Human Rights and Amnesty International (Chilean section). He is a professor of Administrative Law and served for four years as dean of the Faculty of Legal Sciences at the UCT.

== Political career ==
Castillo is a member of the PPD and was one of its founders in the Araucanía Region. He served as a municipal councillor of Temuco from 1992 to 1996 and of Padre Las Casas from 1996 to 2004.

In the elections held on 15–16 May 2021, he ran as a candidate for the 23rd electoral district of the Araucanía Region as part of the Lista del Apruebo electoral pact. He received 5,695 votes, corresponding to 3.5% of the validly cast votes.
