= José Madriz =

President of Nicaragua from 1909 to 1910

José Madriz Rodríguez
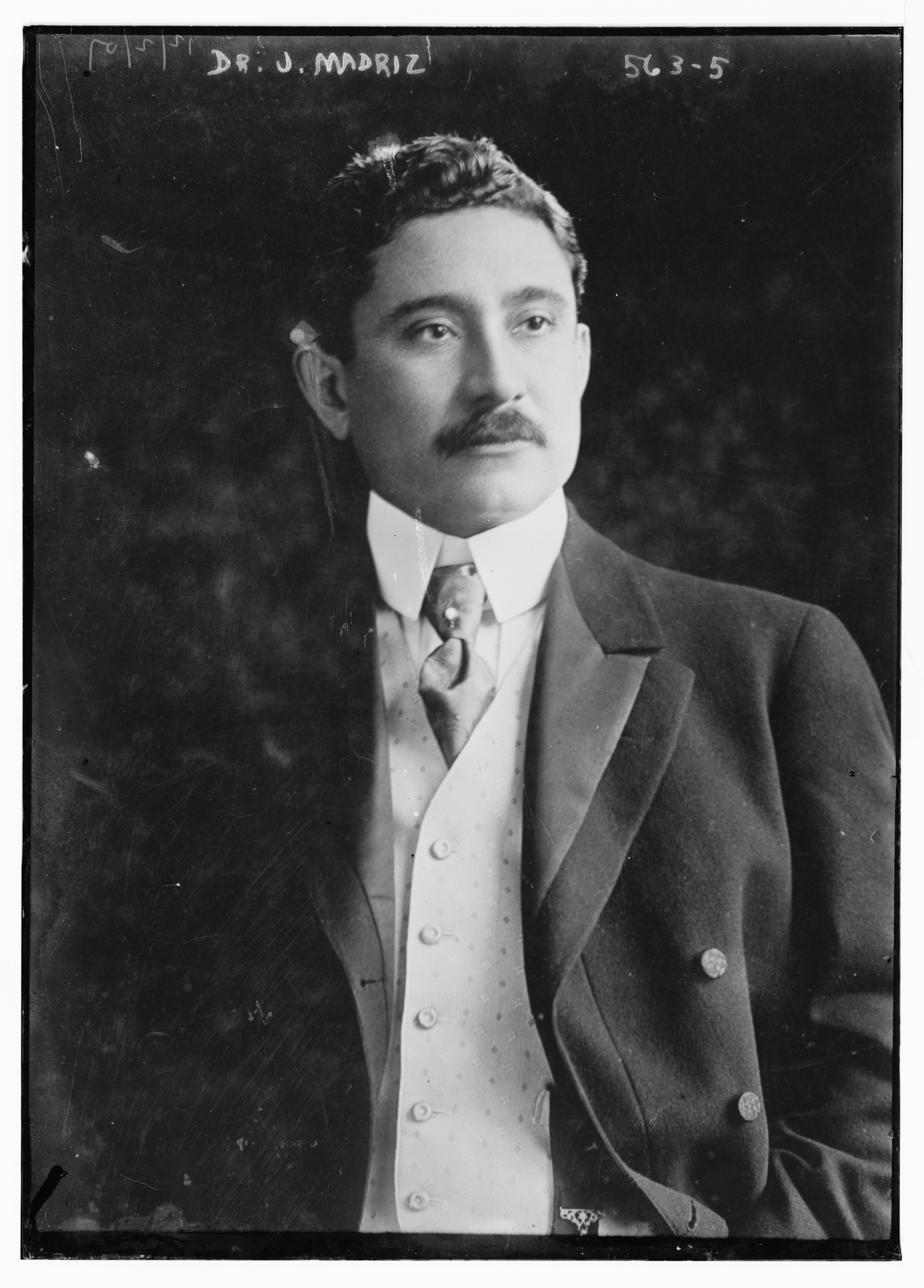

President of Nicaragua Acting
- In office 21 December 1909 – 20 August 1910
- Preceded by: José Santos Zelaya
- Succeeded by: José Dolores Estrada (Acting)

Personal details
- Born: José Santos Madriz Rodríguez; 21 July 1867; León, Nicaragua
- Died: 14 May 1911 (aged 43); Mexico City, Mexico
- Political party: Democratic Party
- Occupation: Politician, Lawyer

José Madriz Rodríguez (21 July 1867 – 14 May 1911) was the President of Nicaragua from 21 December 1909 to 20 August 1910.

Madriz was born on 21 July 1867, in León, Nicaragua. He was president of the Nicaraguan Congress 1896, 1896-1905 and 1909-1910. After President José Santos Zelaya resigned on December 21, 1909 in the face of an armed Counter-Revolution and United States opposition, Madriz assumed the presidency as a designate by the congress. Madriz attempted to establish an Anti-Imperialist struggle against USA interests, but active North American intervention in favor of the Oligarchic politicians proved insurmountable, and he went into exile in August 1910. He died in Mexico City on 14 May 1911.

In 1936, the newly created Madriz Department was named in his honor.

Political offices
Preceded by José Santos Zelaya	President of Nicaragua; 1909–1910	Succeeded by José Dolores Estrada
