= Juan José Estrada =

President of Nicaragua from 1910 to 1911

Juan José Estrada Morales
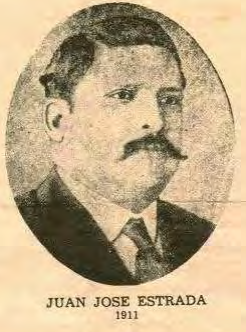

President of Nicaragua (Acting)
- In office 30 August 1910 – 9 May 1911
- Preceded by: Luis Mena (Acting)
- Succeeded by: Adolfo Díaz

Personal details
- Born: 1 January 1872 Managua, Nicaragua
- Died: 11 July 1947 (aged 75) Managua, Nicaragua
- Party: Democratic Party
- Spouse: Salvadora Avilés

Juan José Estrada Morales (1 January 1872 – 11 July 1947) was the President of Nicaragua from 29 August 1910 to 9 May 1911. He came to power after ousting President José Santos Zelaya in 1909. He was liberal.

== Biography ==
Juan José Estrada Morales was a Nicaraguan military and political figure who acted as President of Nicaragua from August 29, 1910, to May 9, 1911.

Estrada was a member of the Liberal Party of Nicaragua. In 1909 he began a rebellion against the liberal government of José Santos Zelaya, who soon resigned. He was president of the Nicaraguan Congress in 1910. In August 1910 the unstable liberal government that succeeded him fell, and on Aug. 29 Estrada became president after his brother José Dolores Estrada Morales transferred the command to him, with his new Conservative government supported by the United States. During the conservative regime that followed his presidency for over 15 years, US Marines had a presence in Nicaragua.

Estrada was born and died in Managua. He came from a humble family of handcrafters of liberal ideology that produced four military men, a colonel and three generals, who became outstanding in Nicaraguan military history. These were José Dolores Estrada Morales, Aurelio, Irineo and himself, who were known as Los Gracos in honor to the Roman Gracchi family.

His three brothers were mayors of Managua: Irineo in 1899, José Dolores in 1901, and Aurelio in 1903. The last was Generalissimo in the victory of the Battle of Namasigüe in 1907. They were all progressive and popular mayors, who built the Parque Central and planted trees all around the city. Estrada died on 11 July 1947 at the age of 75.

Political offices
Preceded by José Dolores Estrada	President of Nicaragua; 1910–1911	Succeeded by Adolfo Díaz
