= Luis Mena (Nicaraguan politician) =

President of Nicaragua from 27 to 30 August 1910

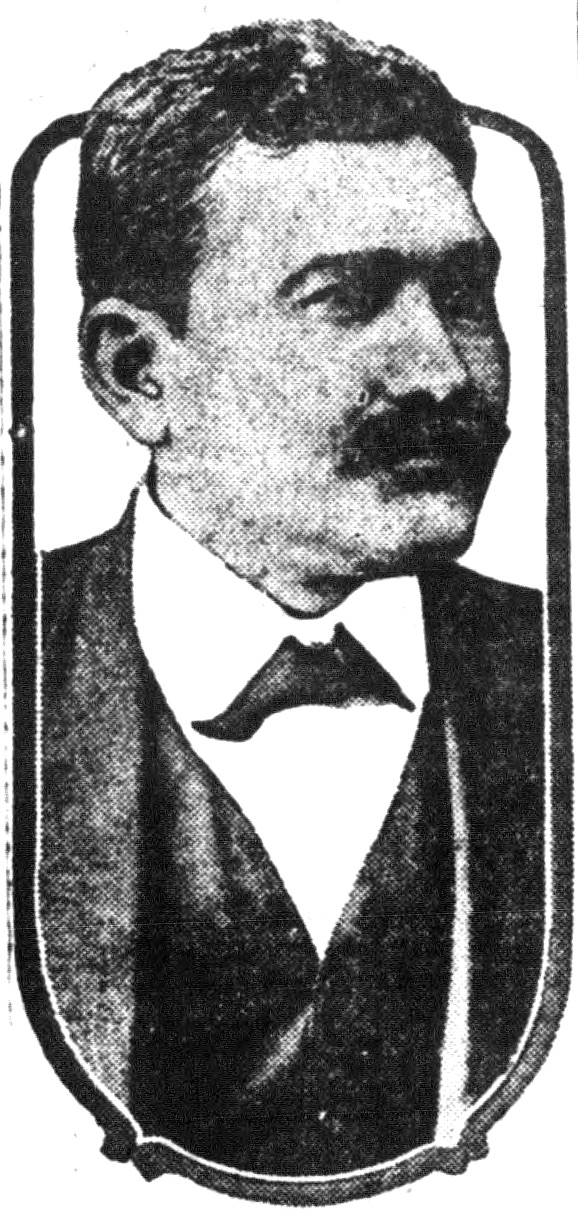

President of Nicaragua (Acting)
- In office 27 August 1910 – 30 August 1910
- Preceded by: José Dolores Estrada (Acting)
- Succeeded by: Juan José Estrada (Acting)

Personal details
- Born: c. 1865 Nandaime, Nicaragua
- Died: 20 May 1928 (aged 62–63) Granada, Nicaragua
- Party: Conservative
- Spouse: Margarita Montiel Leiva
- Children: 1

Luis Mena Vado (c. 1865 – 20 May 1928) was the President of Nicaragua from 27 to 30 August 1910, after the fall of the government of General José Santos Zelaya. He later became acting President in rebellion. Mena was a conservative, part of the coalition government that also included liberal Juan José Estrada and conservatives Emiliano Chamorro Vargas and Adolfo Díaz.

== Liberal-Conservative Revolution 1912 ==
He was one of the leaders along with Benjamin Zeledon and Marcelo Castañeda On 23 September, General Mena, then the top leader of the revolutionaries, surrendered without a fight to the high command of the marines in the city of Granada and was sent into exile in Panama.

Political offices
| Preceded by José Dolores Estrada | President of Nicaragua; 1910 | Succeeded by Juan José Estrada |
