= José Santos Zelaya =

President of Nicaragua from 1893 to 1909

Jose Santos Zelaya
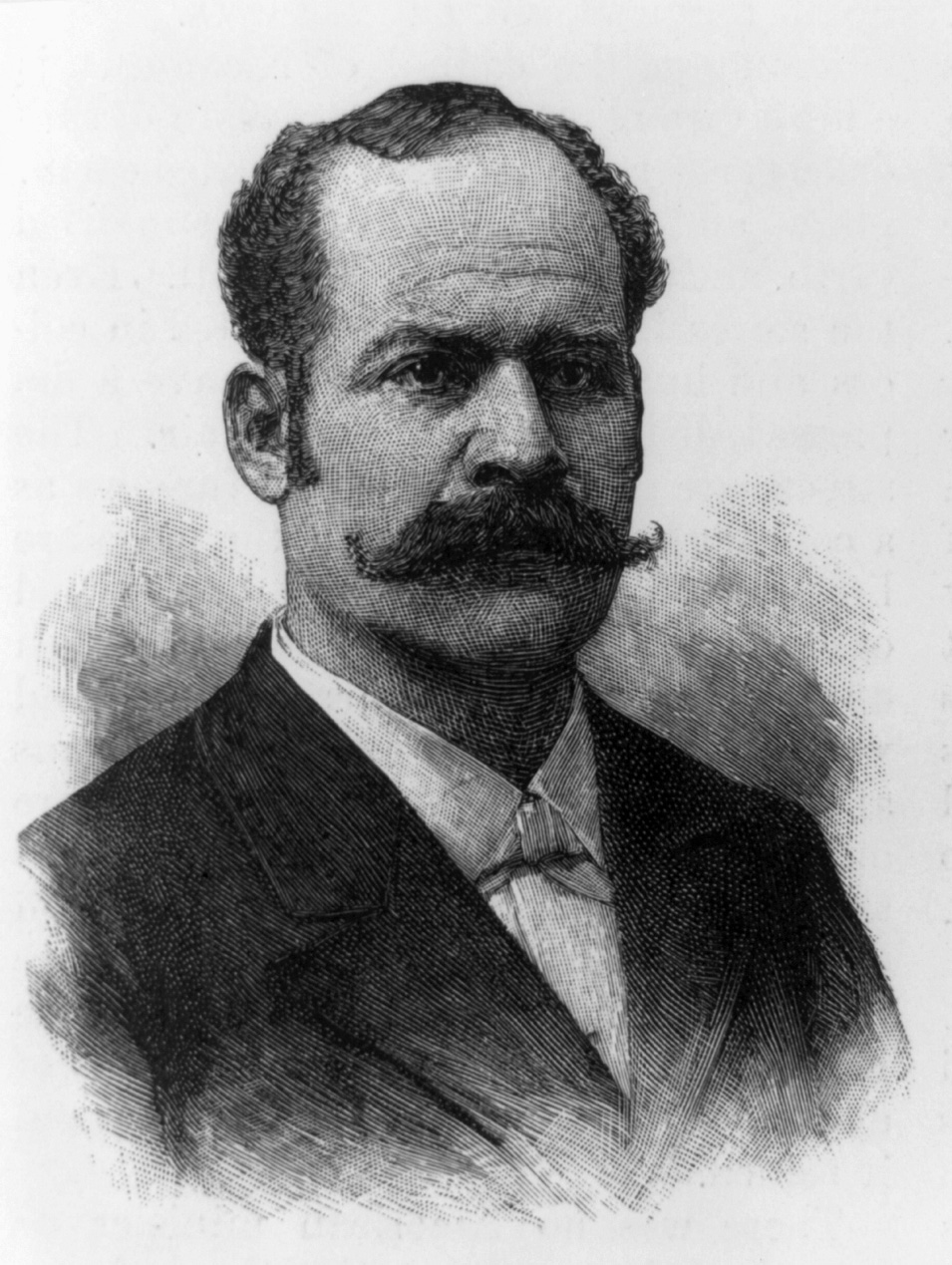

President of Nicaragua
- In office 25 July 1893 – 21 December 1909
- Vice President: Anastasio J. Ortiz 1893–1894 Francisco Baca 1894–1896
- Preceded by: Joaquín Zavala (Acting)
- Succeeded by: José Madriz (Acting)

Personal details
- Born: José Santos Zelaya López; 1 November 1853 Managua, Nicaragua
- Died: 17 May 1919 (aged 65) New York City, U.S.
- Party: Democratic Party

José Santos Zelaya López (1 November 1853 – 17 May 1919) was the President of Nicaragua from 25 July 1893 to 21 December 1909. He was liberal.

In 1909, Zelaya was ousted from office in a rebellion led by liberal Juan José Estrada who was aided by the U.S. government and Nicaraguan conservatives. The overthrow of Zelaya led to a civil war which was brought to an end with the U.S. occupation of Nicaragua in 1912.

== Early life ==
He was a son of José María Zelaya Irigoyen, who was originally from Olancho, Honduras, and his mistress Juana López Ramírez. His father José María was married to Rosario Fernández.

== Politics ==
Zelaya was of Nicaragua's Liberal party and enacted a number of progressive programs, including improved public education, railroads, and established steam ship lines. He also enacted constitutional rights that provided for equal rights, property guarantees, habeas corpus, compulsory vote, compulsory education, the protection of arts and industry, minority representation, and the separation of state powers. However, his desire for national sovereignty often led him to policies contrary to foreign investors.

In 1894, he took control of the Mosquito Coast by military force; it had long been the subject of dispute, and was home to a native settlement claimed as a protectorate by the British Empire. Indeed, Nicaragua (and before that Spain) had always claimed the Caribbean Coast, but "Zambos" (former African runaway slaves mixed with local Indians) and part of the Misquito Indians (probably with the Sumos and Ramas as well), together with the military support of the British Marines, tried to create a free, English-speaking settlement under British protection (Greytown, now San Juan de Nicaragua). This is similar to the cases of Belize and Guatemala, except that Belize has been an independent nation since 1981. Zelaya's aggressive attitude paid off, and the United Kingdom, which probably did not wish to go to war over this distant land, recognized Nicaraguan seizure of the area. The strategic value of this land led to the name "Vía del Tránsito" ("Route of Traffic"). Both the United Kingdom and US wanted the control of this route, which connected the Caribbean Sea to the Pacific Coast across the San Juan River and Lake Nicaragua. At this point, the Panama Canal did not exist, and the US was rising as a new continental power.

Zelaya harbored liberal Honduran dissidents, helping one of them (Policarpo Bonilla) attempt to oust Honduran president Domingo Vásquez.

== Reelection, possibility of a canal, and response from the US ==
José Santos Zelaya was reelected president in 1902 and again in 1906.

The possibility of building a canal across the isthmus of Central America had been the topic of serious discussion since the 1820s, and Nicaragua was long a favored location. When the United States shifted its interests to Panama, Zelaya negotiated with Germany (who happened to be in the middle of a cold war with the U.S. over Caribbean ports) and Japan in an unsuccessful effort to have a canal constructed in his state. Fearful that President Zelaya might generate an alternative foreign alignment in the region, and because of his heavy-handed repression of his opposition and his land seizures, he was opposed by the U.S.

José Zelaya had the project of reuniting the Federal Republic of Central America, with, he hoped, himself as national president. With this aim in mind, he gave aid to factions favouring this project in other Central American nations. This threatened to blow up into a full scale Central American war which would endanger the United States Panamanian canal and give European nations, such as Germany, an excuse to intervene to protect the collection of their bank's payments in the region or if failing that then demand a land concession.

The Zelaya administration had growing friction with the United States government, for example while the French government had inquired to the U.S. whether a loan to Nicaragua would be deemed unfriendly, the U.S. Secretary of State required the loan to be conditional on U.S. relations. After the loan was pending on the Paris stock exchange, the U.S. further isolated Nicaragua by pointing out any money Zelaya would receive "would be without doubt spent to purchase munitions to oppress his neighbors" and in "hostility to peace and progress in Central America." The US State Department also demanded that all investments in Central America would also need be approved by the U.S. as a means to protect U.S. interests, peace and liberal institutions. According to a French minister, there was also a desire to overthrow Zelaya.

The U.S. started giving financing aid to his Conservative and Liberal opponents in Nicaragua who broke out in open rebellion in October 1909, led by Liberal General Juan José Estrada. Nicaragua sent its forces into Costa Rica to suppress Estrada's pro U.S. rebel forces, but U.S. officials deemed the incursion as an affront to Estrada's aims and attempted to persuade Costa Rica into acting first against Nicaragua, but Foreign Minister Ricardo Fernández Guardia assured Calvo that Costa Rica was determined "not to enter such dangerous actions as those proposed by Washington." It "considered the joint action proposed contrary to the Washington treaty and desired to maintain a neutral attitude." Costa Rican officials considered the United States a more serious threat to Central American peace and harmony than attacks from Zelaya's Nicaragua. Costa Rica Foreign Minister Fernández Guardia insisted, "We do not understand here what interests can the Washington government have that Costa Rica assumes a resolutely aggressive position against Nicaragua, with the danger of compromising the observation of the...conventions of December 20, 1907.... It is in Central America's interest that U.S. action with respect to Nicaragua should assume the character of an international conflict and in no sense the character of an intervention tolerated and even less solicited or supported by the other signatory republics of the Washington Treaty. So Costa Rica's uneasiness meant that it never was a help to USA Policy against Nicaragua's aggressive policy towards it in those times. On the contrary, some Liberals from Costa Rica exiled in Nicaragua during Zelaya's regime. Liberals returned to the Government in Costa Rica with the polemic President Ascensión Esquivel Ibarra (1902–1906), who was born in Nicaragua and later with the first Government of President Ricardo Jiménez Oreamuno (1910–1914). Liberal returned in Civil and a Democratic way to Costa Rica with the popular and progressive Government of Alfredo González Flores (1914–1917), overthrow by the short Dictatorship (1917–1919) of Federico Tinoco Granados, during World War I.

== US sets up base of operations in Nicaragua ==
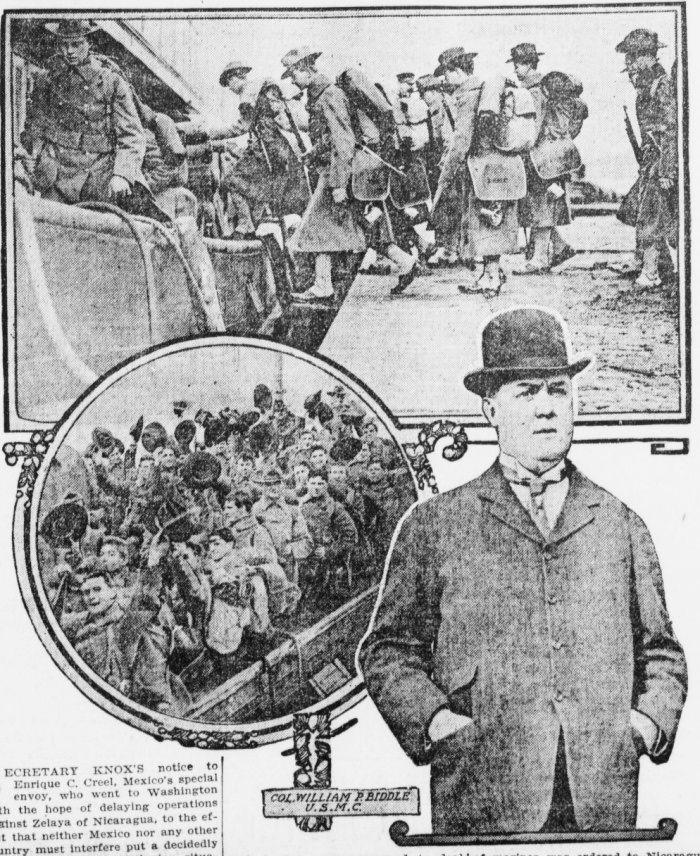
U.S. Marines leaving New York City in 1909 for deployment in Nicaragua. Then-Colonel William P. Biddle, in charge of the detachment, is in civilian clothes at right.

Officers of Zelaya's government executed some alleged rebels; two United States volunteers (Cannon and Groce) were among them, and the U.S. government declared their execution grounds for a diplomatic break between the countries which later led to formal intervention.

At the start of December, United States Marines landed in Nicaragua's Bluefields port, to create a neutral zone to protect foreign lives and property but which also acted as a base of operations for the anti-Zelayan rebels. On 17 December 1909, Zelaya turned over power to José Madriz and fled to Spain. Madriz called for continued suppression of the uprising, but in August 1910 diplomat Thomas Dawson obtained the capitulation of the government and the withdrawal of Madriz. Thereafter the U.S. called for a popular voice in the government and a constituent assembly was called to write a constitution for Nicaragua. The vacant presidency was filled by a series of Conservative politicians including Adolfo Diaz. During this time, through free trade and loans, the U.S. influenced the expanding prosperity and development of the country.

== Family ==
His son, named after the King of Spain, was pianist Don Alfonso Zelaya. He was educated in Europe before his father sent him to America to pursue a military career. He was a graduate of West Point, 1910, and served four years in the U.S. Army, including the World War I years. In 1911 he married his first wife, American-born Marguerite Lee, grandniece of General Robert E. Lee. They had a son they named José Santos.

As a pianist he played with the San Francisco and Minneapolis symphony orchestras. With a repertoire of 300 classical pieces, his performances were not limited to the concert stage, for he also enjoyed bringing classical music to the vaudeville (Keith-Orpheum Circuit) stage. According to the Spokane (Washington) Spokesman-Review (Mar. 4, 1932):

"...what is unique about this most affable and rotund Castilian is that he plays classical music and makes vaudeville audiences like it. He has a certain humor, a philosophical way of presenting his music that makes his audiences clamor for more and more."

Beginning in 1933 he made sporadic film appearances playing bit parts. He is best known today as the Mexican who gives involved and incomprehensible Spanish-language directions to the Three Stooges in their 1942 short, "What's the Matador?" His last role was as "Gimpy", the piano player in Macao (1952). Don Zelaya died in North Hollywood on December 14, 1951.
