= Chinchilla (disambiguation) =

A chinchilla is a fur-bearing mountain rodent native to South America.

Chinchilla may also refer to:

== Fur ==
- Chinchilla rabbit, three breeds whose coat resembles that of chinchillas
- Chinchilla rat or chinchillones, of the family Abrocomidae
- A fur color determined by cat genetics

== People ==
- Daisy Bertenshaw (born 1996), English singer, songwriter and rapper known as Chinchilla.
- Alfredo Chinchilla (born 1962), Costa Rica-born Norwegian judoka
- Carlos Samayoa Chinchilla (1898–1973), Guatemalan writer
- Édgar Chinchilla (born 1987), Guatemalan footballer
- Laura Chinchilla (born 1959), President of Costa Rica
- Marvin Chinchilla (born 1977), Costa Rican football player
- Maya Chinchilla, Guatemalan-American poet
- Norma Chinchilla, (born 1945) American sociologist
- Óscar Chinchilla (born 1969), Guatemalan politician
- Pablo Chinchilla (born 1978), Costa Rican footballer

== Places ==
=== Australia ===
- Chinchilla, Queensland, a town
  - Chinchilla Airport
  - Chinchilla Digger Statue, a heritage-listed memorial
  - Chinchilla railway station
  - Shire of Chinchilla, a former local government area

=== Spain ===
- Chinchilla de Montearagón, a municipality in Albacete, Castile-La Mancha, Spain
  - Castle of Chinchilla
- Villar de Chinchilla, Albacete, Castile-La Mancha, Spain

=== United States ===
- Chinchilla, Pennsylvania

== Other uses ==
- Chinchilla (band), a heavy metal band
- Chinchillas (lava dome), Chile and Argentina
- Chinchilla (cloth), a napped fabric
- Chinchilla is a language model developed by DeepMind.
