= Azarías Pallais =

Azarías de Jesús Pallais or Azarías H. Pallais (November 3, 1884 – September 6, 1954) is regarded as one of Nicaragua's greatest poets. He was born in León. Pallais's father was a medical doctor and his mother was a niece of liberal statesman Máximo Jerez. He was a descendant of Henri Pallais (hence the middle initial H.), a Frenchman who settled in Nicaragua at the turn of the nineteenth century.

== Career in the priesthood ==
In 1900 Pallais joined the San Ramon seminary. In 1905, President Zelaya expelled an entire section of the Nicaraguan clergy, including Pallais, then aged 20, who moved to Paris and joined the Saint-Sulpice seminary to continue his theological studies. He was ordained as a Roman Catholic priest in 1908. Pallais studied at the Catholic University of Leuven in Belgium and received a PhD in theology. In 1911 he returned to his hometown of León in Nicaragua. In that same year his preaching scandalized the conservative local clergy, resulting in his suspension a divinis (the gravest canonical sanction) by the bishop. Monsignor Pereira annulled the sanction sometime later that year.

== Literary career ==
Pallais remained in León until 1940, living at his mother’s house in the old La Recoleccion barrio. During that time he became the most popular Nicaraguan poet after Rubén Darío. In a series of poetry books, Pallais joined the Modernist revolution in literature and contributed greatly to its development in the Spanish-speaking world.

Books published during this period include: A la sombra del agua (In the shadow of the water) (1917), Espumas y Estrellas (Foam and stars) (1919) and Caminos (Paths) (1921).

In 1923 Pallais's speech Socialist Words, addressed for the first time in the country the burning social issues of the day from a Christian perspective. Then in 1927 he published The Book of Evangelical Words, and joined his literary efforts with those of the emerging literary vanguard (Pablo Antonio Cuadra, José Coronel Urtecho and Joaquín Pasos).

In 1928 he published his major work of poetry: Bello Tono Menor (Beautiful Minor Tone), an international success. In 1929 he was made a member of the Nicaraguan Literary Academy. The period between 1930 and 1936 was filled with financial and other hardships. His reputation suffered under the government of Moncada, an old enemy. Nevertheless, he managed to write and publish his Glosas (Comments), a highly politicized critique of the government, in various newspapers throughout Nicaragua.

Upon the accession to power of dictator Anastasio Somoza García, Pallais initially supported him, then had a major falling out which resulted in the loss of all his privileges. In 1940 he was made a simple parish priest in the port town of Corinto, 75 miles north of the capital, Managua, where he remained until his death. His intensive work as a preacher, social activist, protector of the poor and destitute earned him great local admiration. In 1951 he published his last book of poetry: Piraterias (Piracies).

After his death he was enshrined by the literary establishment as one of Nicaraguan poetry’s "Three Great Ones" (the others being Alfonso Cortés and Salomón de la Selva).
