= León Cathedral, Nicaragua =

Cathedral in Nicaragua

Cathedral of the Assumption of Mary, León Catedral de la Asuncíon de María de León (in Spanish)
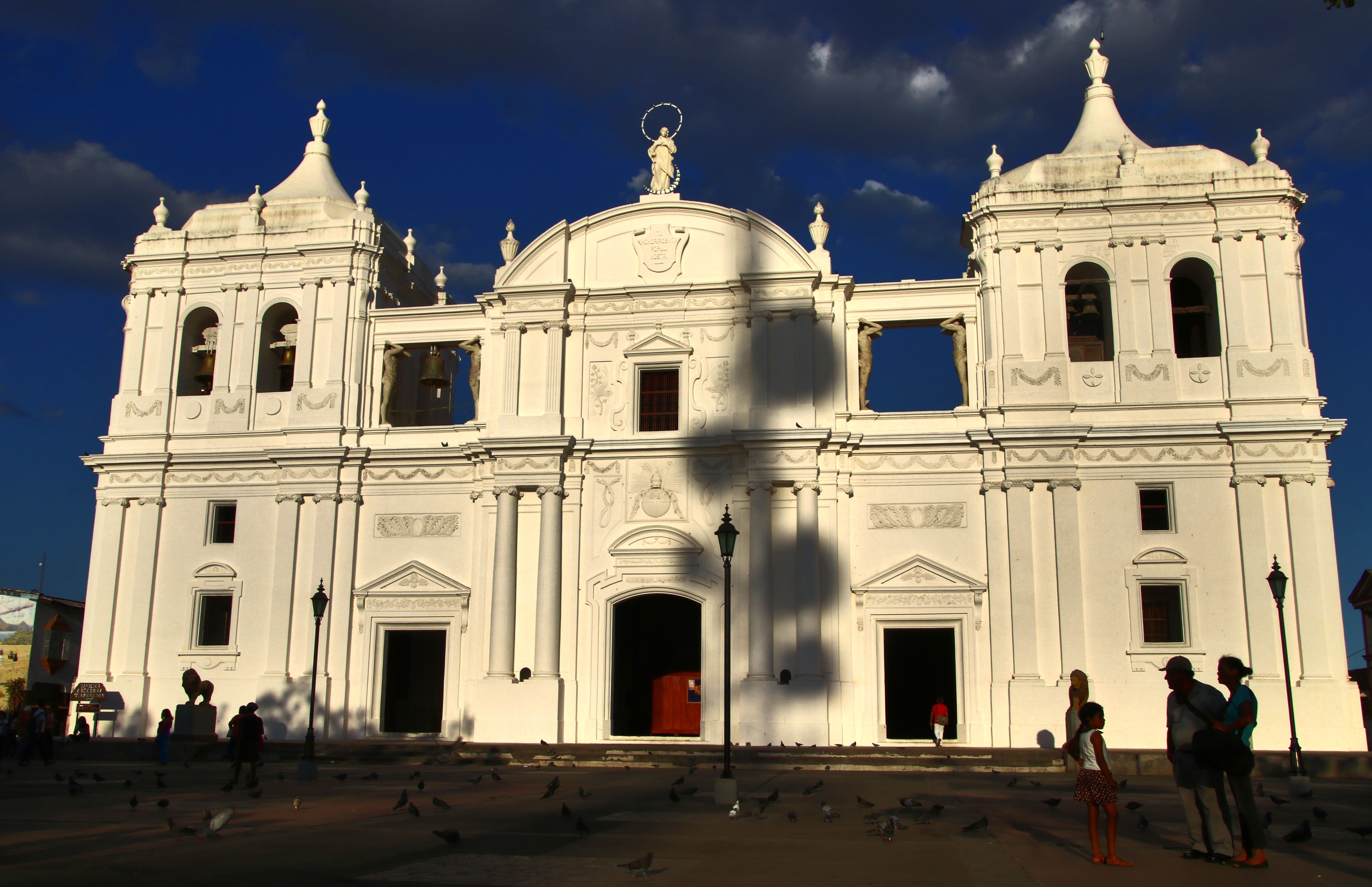

Religion
- Affiliation: Roman Catholic
- Province: Diocese of León
- Year consecrated: 1860

Location
- Location: León, Nicaragua
- Interactive map of Cathedral of the Assumption of Mary, León; Catedral de la Asuncíon de María de León (in Spanish)
- Coordinates: 12°26′6″N 86°52′41″W

Architecture
- Architect: Diego José de Porres Esquivel
- Style: Baroque and Neoclassical
- Groundbreaking: 1747
- Completed: 1814
- UNESCO World Heritage Site
- Official name: León Cathedral
- Type: Cultural
- Criteria: ii, iv
- Designated: 2011 (35th session)
- Reference no.: 1236rev
- State Party: Nicaragua
- Region: Latin America and the Caribbean

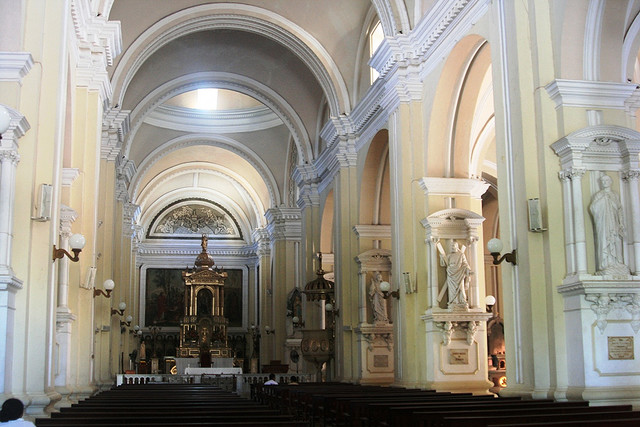
The interior of the cathedral

The Cathedral of the Assumption of Mary, also known as the "Royal and Renowned Basilica Cathedral of the Assumption of the Blessed Virgin Mary" (Spanish: Real e Insigne Basílica de la Asunción de la Bienaventurada Virgen María), is a significantly important and historic landmark in León, Nicaragua. The cathedral was awarded World Heritage Site status with the United Nations Educational, Scientific and Cultural Organization (UNESCO). The site's nomination is Nicaragua's third cultural landmark, following the ruins of León Viejo and El Güegüense.

== Construction ==
The cathedral's construction lasted between 1747 and 1814 and was consecrated by Pope Pius IX in 1860. Cathedral has maintained the status of being the largest cathedral in Central America and one of the best known in the Americas due to its distinct architecture and special cultural importance.

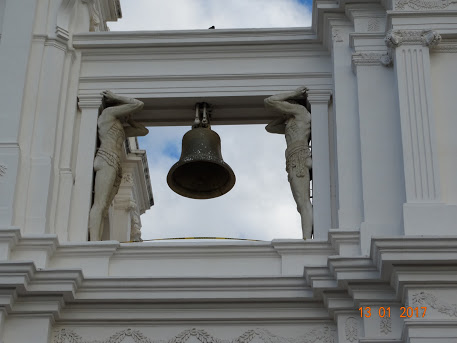
Titans on the pediment of the cathedral

== Architecture ==
The architectural design was developed in 1762 by the Guatemalan architect Diego José de Porres Esquivel. It blends the Baroque and Neoclassicism styles with some influences from Gothic, Renaissance and Mudéjar styles. Thus the building can be categorized as belonging to the Eclecticism style. The cathedral has a rectangular plan, of a type general in those centuries and similar to those of the cathedrals of Lima and Cuzco, Peru. The towers and the facade are mainly Neoclassical. The cathedral has a nave and four aisles, ten arched bays and two towers in the facade, flanking a central round pediment marking the position of the nave. The sacrarium, whose salient breaks the rectangular symmetry of the building on the South side, is located almost parallel to the biggest altar. Their interior is roomy and its columns cruciform; the central nave is divided by columns from the lateral aisles and the structure is finished off over the crossing by a great dome. The facade, elevated on a terrace, combines Baroque show with the neoclassical style. The windows are arched and the two towers have Chinese domes. Due to the robustness of its walls, the cathedral has survived tremors, volcanic eruptions of the Cerro Negro volcano and wars.

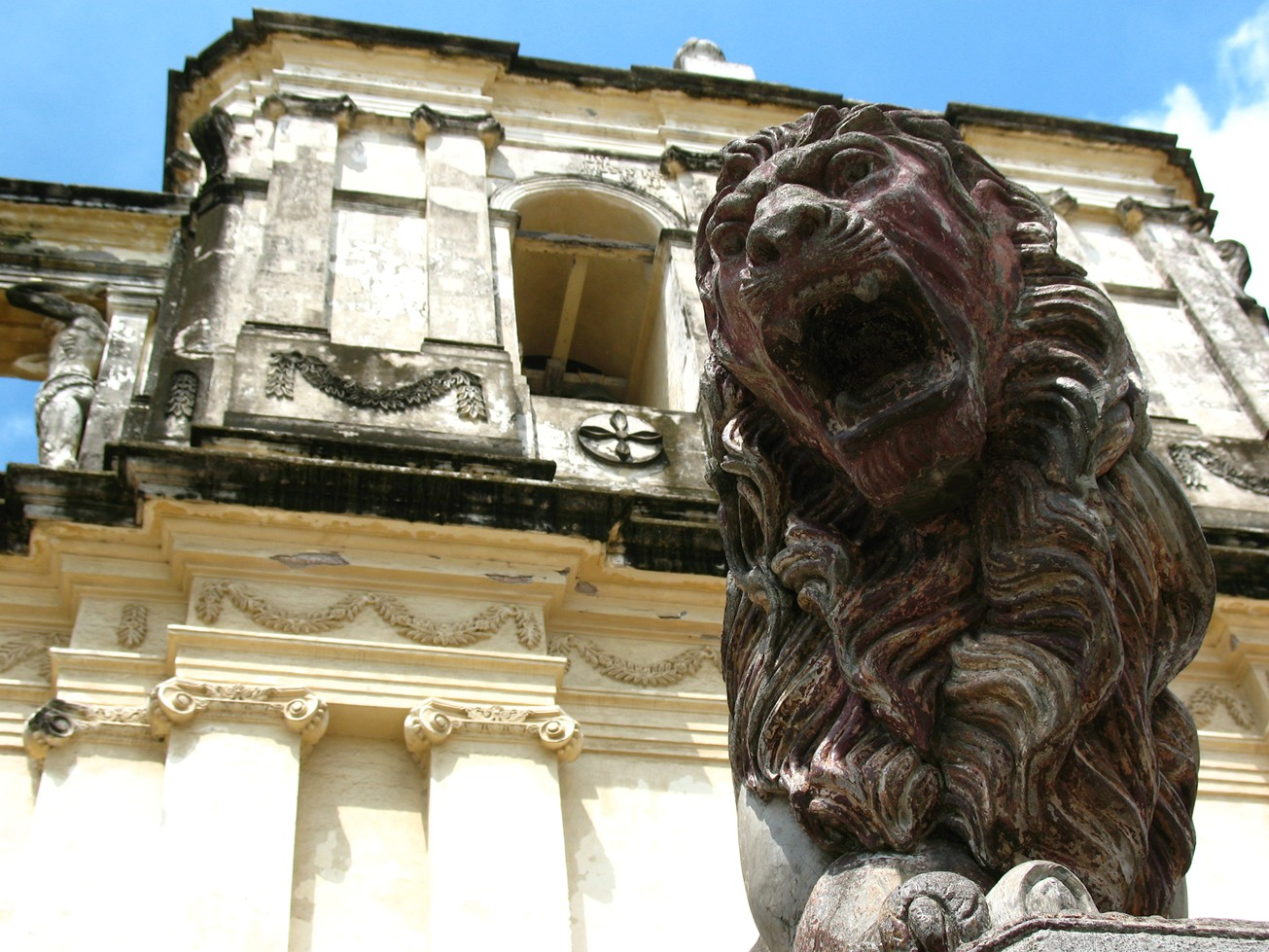
Lion at the facade of the cathedral

Seven tunnels start under the church and lead to the other churches in the city. The church has seven cellars; they provide stability in the event of earthquakes. One of these cellars leads to the tunnels that make their way to the other churches in the city. Above ground, the church has 34 domes which help provide both ventilation and light; "the building is one of the best naturally illuminated cathedrals in America". People were offered the possibility to be buried below the cathedral, helping to fund the construction and maintenance of the building.

== Historical value ==
The cathedral has the historical value of being the Episcopal first diocese of the Catholic Church in Nicaragua, founded in 1531 and therefore one of the oldest dioceses in America. It is currently the headquarters of the Diócesis of León.

Beneath the cathedral, in crypts designed to survive earthquakes, the mortal remains of 27 people rest, among them 10 bishops, 5 priests, an eminent leader of the independence movement, three poets, a musician, six notables and a slave.

Here are buried prominent Nicaraguan people, such as Miguel Larreynaga, poets Rubén Darío, Salomón de la Selva and Alfonso Cortés, the musician José de la Cruz Mena, doctor Luis H. Debayle, professor Edgardo Buitrago, the first bishop of León and last bishop of all of Nicaragua, Monsignor Simeón Pereira, Bishop Castellón and Monsignor Marcelino Areas Poveda.

The tomb of Darío, father of the Modernist movement in Spanish-language literature and considered Prince of Castilian letters, is to the foot of the statue of San Pablo.

At the beginning of the 20th century, the Bishop, Monsignor Simón Pereira y Castellón (the same who presided over the funeral of Darío the 13 February 1916) commissioned the Granadan sculptor Jorge Navas Cordonero to make the statue of the Virgin Mary crowning the central pediment of the facade, and the Atlantes between the pediment and the towers. Navas also sculpted the Neoclassical statues of the Twelve Apostles next to the columns of the central nave, the lion of Dario's tomb, very similar to the Lion of Lucerne, Switzerland (carved by the Danish sculptor Bertel Thorvaldsen, 1770–1844), the sculpture of Christ marking Monsignor Pereira's tomb, and several other decorations inside the Cathedral and its Chapel of the Sacrarium.

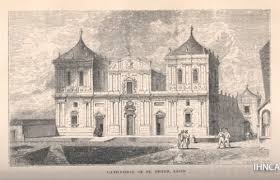
Cathedral of León in 1852

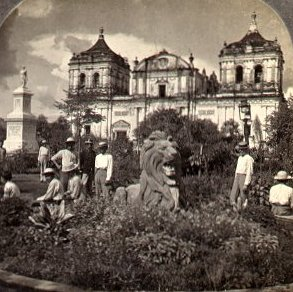
León Cathedral in 1900

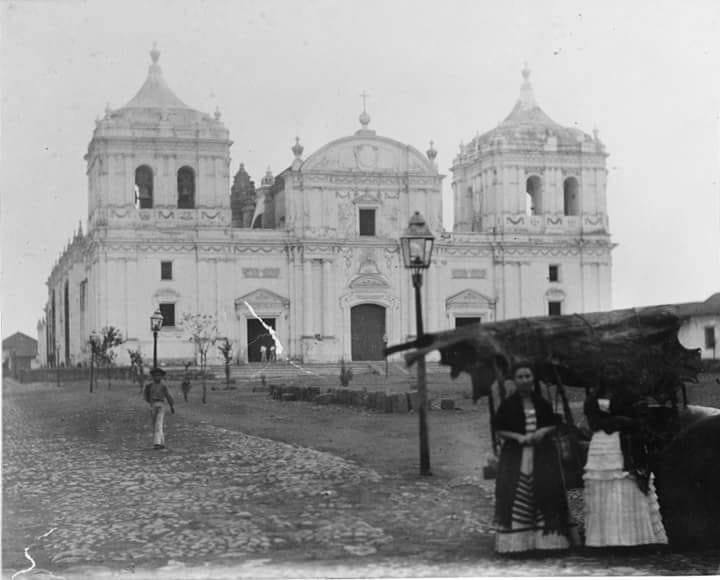
Cathedral of León in 1907

It is also home to a splinter of the original cross upon which Jesus died.

== Illustrious figures buried in the Cathedral ==
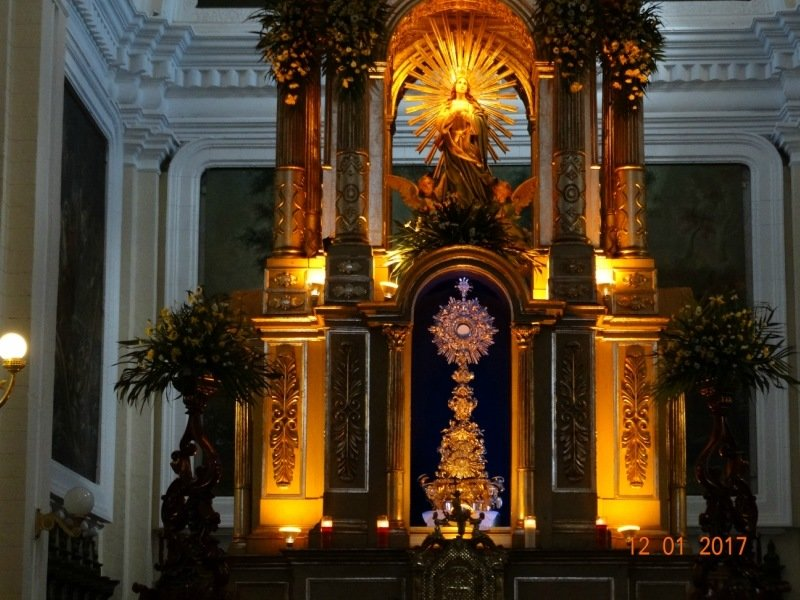
Altar

- Bishops: Diego Alvaréz de Osorio, Francisco de Mendavia and Antonio de Valdivieso, the first three bishops of Nicaragua, whose remains were transferred from León Viejo on February 26, 2008. Juan Benito Garret y Arlovi, Domingo Antonio Zattarain, José Antonio Flores de Ribero, Juan Carlos Vílchez y Cabrera, Nicolás García Jerez, Simeón Pereira y Castellón, Agustín Nicolás Tigerino y Loáisiga and Cesár Bosco Vivas Robelo.
- Priests: José Desiderio de la Quadra, Remigio Casco, Rafael Jerez (brother of the independentist hero Máximo Jerez and the painter Toribio Jerez), Félix Pereira y Castellón and Marcelino Areas.
- Independence hero Miguel Larreynaga (1772–1847), rather, his offspring, whose ashes were brought from Guatemala in the 1970s.
- The poets: Rubén Darío (1867–1916), Salomón de la Selva (1893–1959) and Alfonso Cortés (1893–1969).
- The musician José de la Cruz Mena, whose ashes were transferred from the Guadalupe Cemetery on May 3, 1998.
- Notable: Alfonso Ayón, Pedro Argüello, mayor of León. Leocadia del Prado Arguello; the wise doctor Luis H. Debayle and his wife Casimira Sacasa; Professor Edgardo Buitrago. Politician Mariano Montealegre Fuentes-Sanson and his wife Dolores Sacasa Sarria.
- A saint slave, according to Ernesto Cardenal's collection of facts.

== World Heritage ==
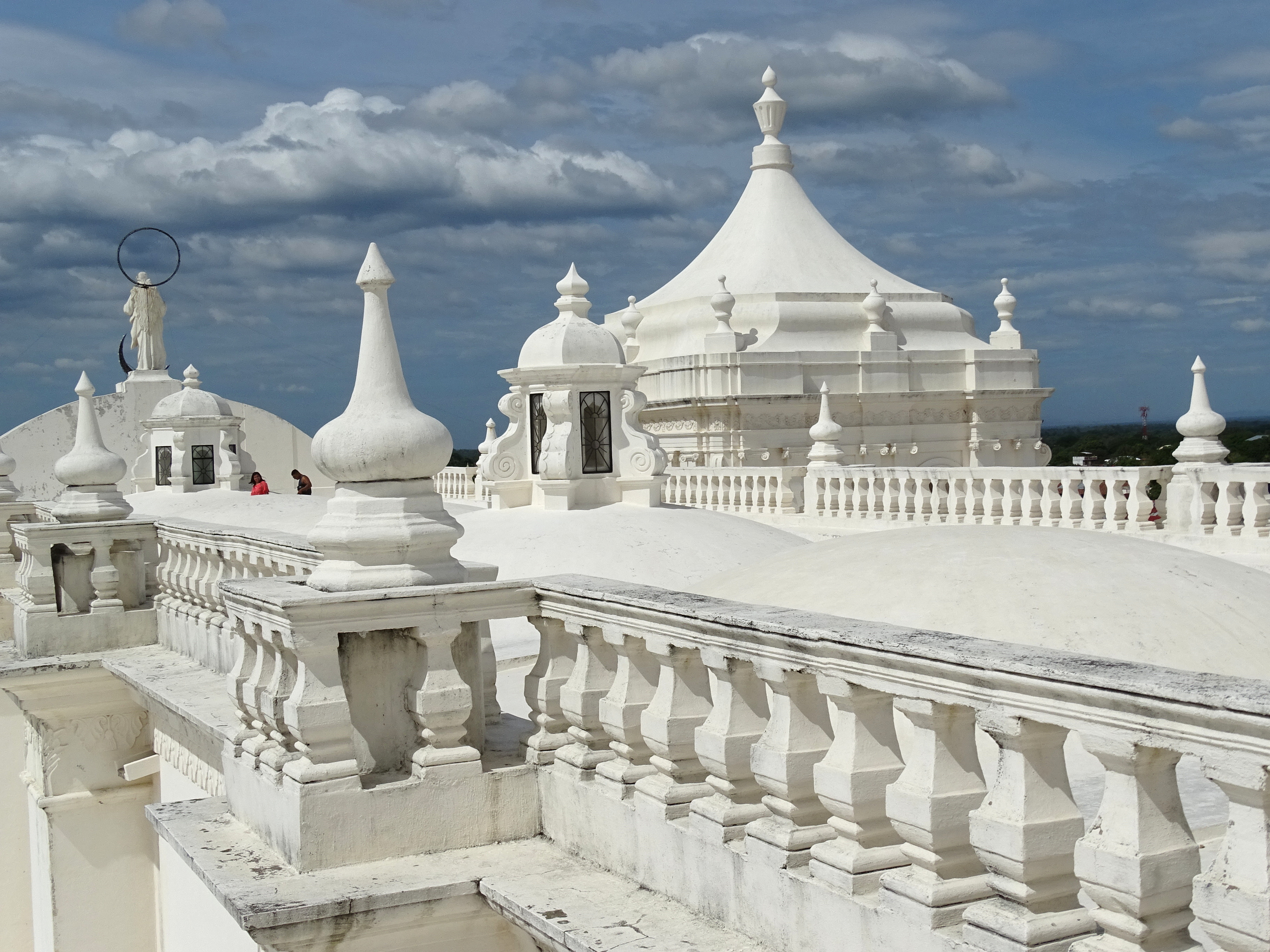
View of cathedral from roof

Due to its great artistic, cultural and historical value, on June 28, 2011, it was elevated by the United Nations Educational, Scientific and Cultural Organization (UNESCO) to the category of World Heritage Site, being the second in the history of this country.

In its statement, UNESCO described the Nicaraguan architectural sight as follows:

The cathedral of León in Nicaragua was built between 1747 and the beginning of the 19th century with designs by the Guatemalan architect Diego José de Porres Esquivel. It expresses the transition from baroque to neoclassical architecture and its style can be considered eclectic. The cathedral is characterized by the sobriety of its interior decoration and the abundance of natural light. The vault of the sanctuary presents a very rich ornamentation. The cathedral has in its interior important works of art, including a Flemish altar and paintings of the 14 stations of the Via Crucis by the Nicaraguan artist Antonio Sarria.
