= Claudia Lars =

Salvadoran poet

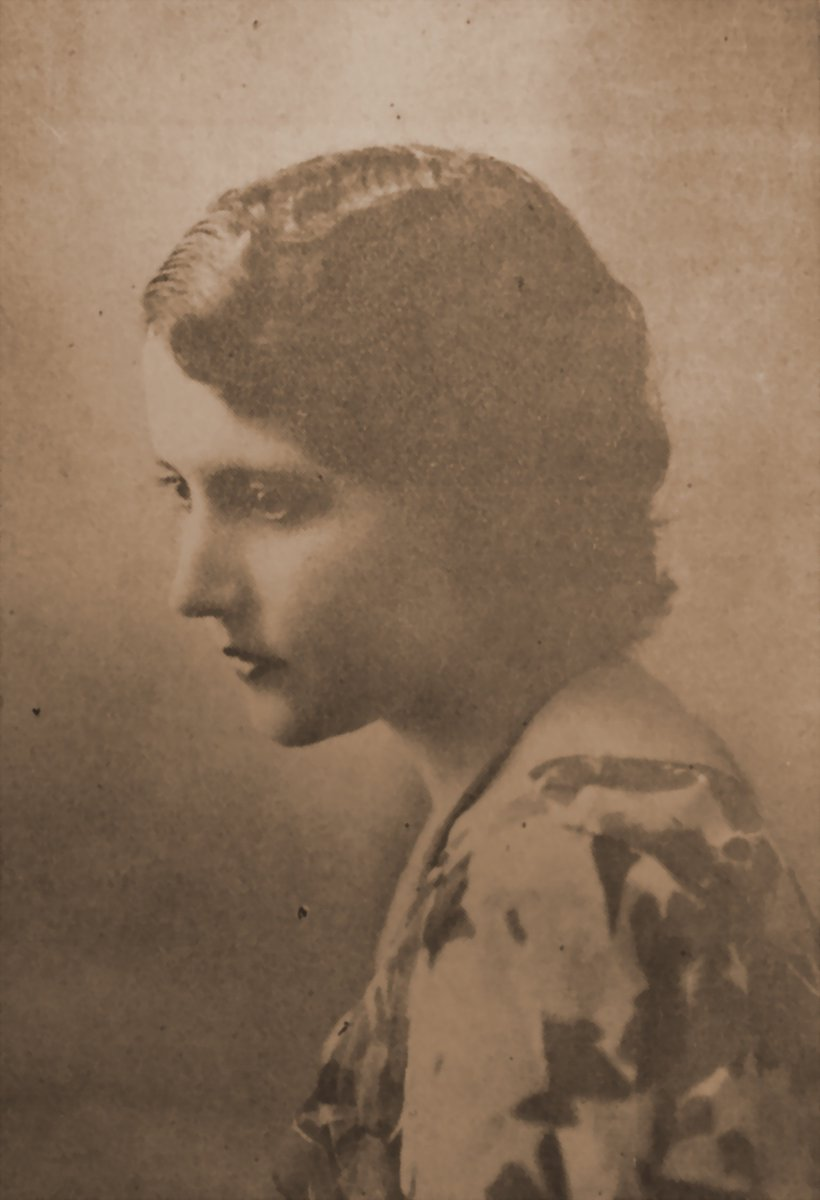
Poet Claudia Lars; Diplomat, writer & feminist

Claudia Lars, born in Armenia, El Salvador on December 20, 1899 as Margarita del Carmen Brannon Vega, was a Salvadoran poet. She died in San Salvador in 1974. She was the daughter of Peter Patrick Brannon and Carmen Vega Zelayandía.

== Early life ==
Her parents were Peter Patrick Brannon (Irish) and Carmen Brannon Vega Zelayandía (Salvadoran). During her early years, she was friends with Consuelo Suncín, the future wife of Antoine de Saint-Exupéry. She started her education at home, and later studied at the Colegio La Asunción de Santa Ana as a teenager.

General Juan José Cañas, who got a booklet of poems written by her, published the book, without Claudia's authorization, under the title of "Triste Mirajes".

In 1919, Claudia started a relationship with Nicaraguan poet Salomón de la Selva, but her parents ended the relationship, by sending Claudia to the United States. In the United States Claudia met her first husband: Leroy F. Beers Kuehn. Claudia worked as a Spanish Teacher at the famous Berlitz School in Brooklyn.

== Travels and publications ==
Claudia returned to El Salvador with her husband in 1927, after Leroy was appointed United States consul, the same year she gave birth to her only son Roy Beers Brannon.

Claudia became friends with other poets and writers in El Salvador, among those were Salarrué, Alberto Guerra Trigueros, Serafin Quiteño and Alberto Masferrer. In 1933 she began using the pseudonym Claudia Lars. In 1934 her first book was published: "Stars in the Well"

At the beginning of the next decade, Claudia Lars won second place in the 1941 Floral Games in Guatemala thanks to her work "Sonnets of Michael". Then came "The Glass House" (Santiago de Chile, 1942); "Romances of North and South (1946), "City under my Voice" *(1947), which was the winner of the events commemorating the fourth centenary of the city of San Salvador.

Claudia was appointed as cultural attaché to the Embassy of El Salvador in Guatemala. She went to Guatemala in 1948, where she met her second husband Carlos Samayoa Chinchilla, who was divorced in 1967. However, before getting married, she endured a hectic life in which she worked packing peaches in the United States, translating stories for Walt Disney and Salvadorans working together on anti-fascist newspapers.

== Selected works ==
- Estrellas en el Pozo, (1934).
- Cancion Redonda, (1934)
- Romances de Norte y Sur, (1946).
- Donde Llegan los pasos, (1953).
- Fábula de una Verdad, (1959).
- Tierra de Infancia, (1959) tr. as Land of Childhood, Writers Club Press (2003), ISBN 0-595-27353-X
- Presencia en el Tiempo, (1960).
- Girasol, (1961).
- Sobre el Angel y el Hombre, (1962).
- Del fino Amanecer, (1964).
- Nuestro Pulsante Mundo (apuntes sobre una nueva edad), (1969).
- Poesía Última, (1972).
