= León, Nicaragua =

Second-largest city in Nicaragua

León
- Municipality
- Santiago de los Caballeros de León
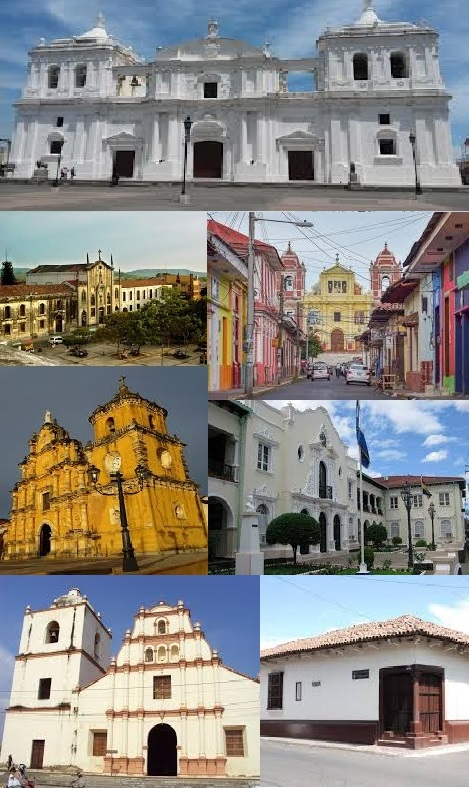
- Left to right: The León Cathedral · La Asunción Catholic school · El Calvario church · La Recolección church · UNAN-León · San Juan Bautista de Sutiaba church · Rubén Darío museum

- Flag Seal

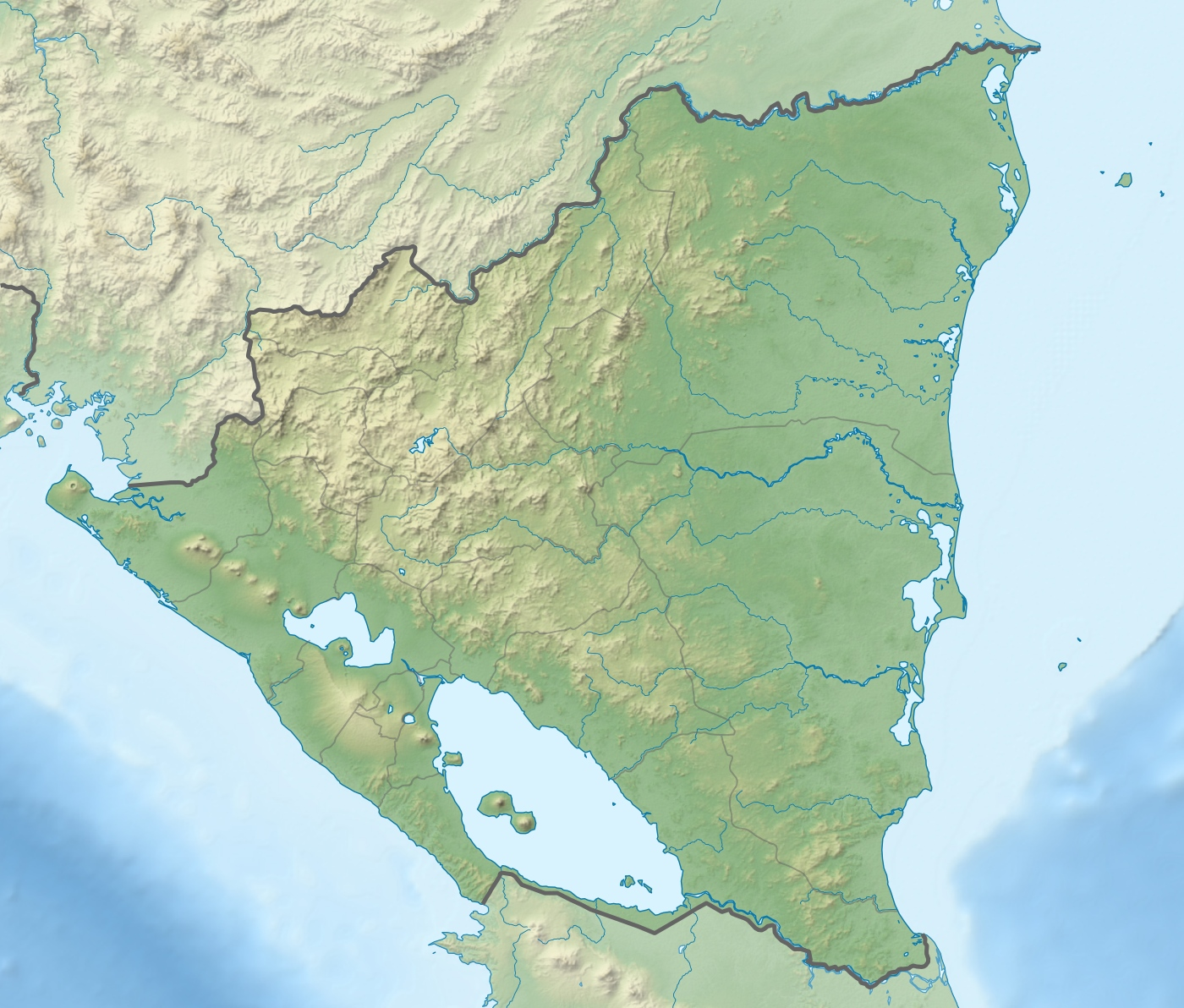
- Location in Nicaragua León (Central America)
- Coordinates: 12°26′0″N 86°53′12″W
- Country: Nicaragua
- Department: León
- Founded: 15 June 1524; 502 years ago

Government
  - Mayor: Roger Gurdián Vijil

Area
  - Municipality: 820 km^{2} (320 sq mi)
- Elevation: 109.21 m (358.3 ft)

Population (2022 estimate)
  - Municipality: 213,718
  - Density: 260/km^{2} (680/sq mi)
  - Urban: 176,171 (2nd in Nicaragua)
- Demonym(s): Leonés, -esa
- Time zone: UTC-6 (Central (CST))

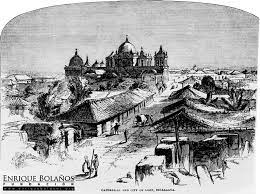
The city of León, Nicaragua in 1857.

León (Spanish pronunciation: [leˈon]) is the second largest city in Nicaragua, after Managua. Founded by the Spanish as Santiago de los Caballeros de León, it is the capital and largest city of León Department. As of 2022, the municipality of León has an estimated population of 213,718.

León is located along the Río Chiquito (Chiquito River), some 90 kilometres (56 miles) northwest of Managua, and some 18 km (11 miles) east of the Pacific Ocean coast. León has long been the political and intellectual center of the nation and its National Autonomous University of Nicaragua (UNAN) was founded in 1812, making it the second oldest university in Central America. León is also an important industrial, agricultural, and commercial center for Nicaragua, exporting sugar cane, cattle, peanut, plantain, and sorghum. The city has been home to many of Nicaragua's most noteworthy poets including Rubén Darío, Alfonso Cortés and Salomón de la Selva.

== History ==
The first city named León in Nicaragua was founded in 1524 by Francisco Hernández de Córdoba about 30 kilometres (20 mi) east of the present site. The city was abandoned in 1610 after a series of earthquakes spawned by a volcanic eruption. The ruins of that city are known as León Viejo and were excavated in 1960. In the year 2000, León Viejo was declared a UNESCO World Heritage Site.

León had been the capital of Nicaragua since colonial times. So naturally, when Nicaragua withdrew from the United Provinces of Central America in 1839, León became the capital of the new nation. For some years, the capital shifted back and forth between León and the city of Granada. Liberal administrations preferred León while Conservative administrations preferred Granada, until as a compromise proposed by the then Supreme Director of Nicaragua, Fulgencio Vega, Managua was agreed upon to be the permanent capital in 1852.

In 1950, the city of León had a population of 31,000 people. Nicaraguan president Anastasio Somoza García was shot and mortally wounded in León on 21 September 1956.

== Heritage ==
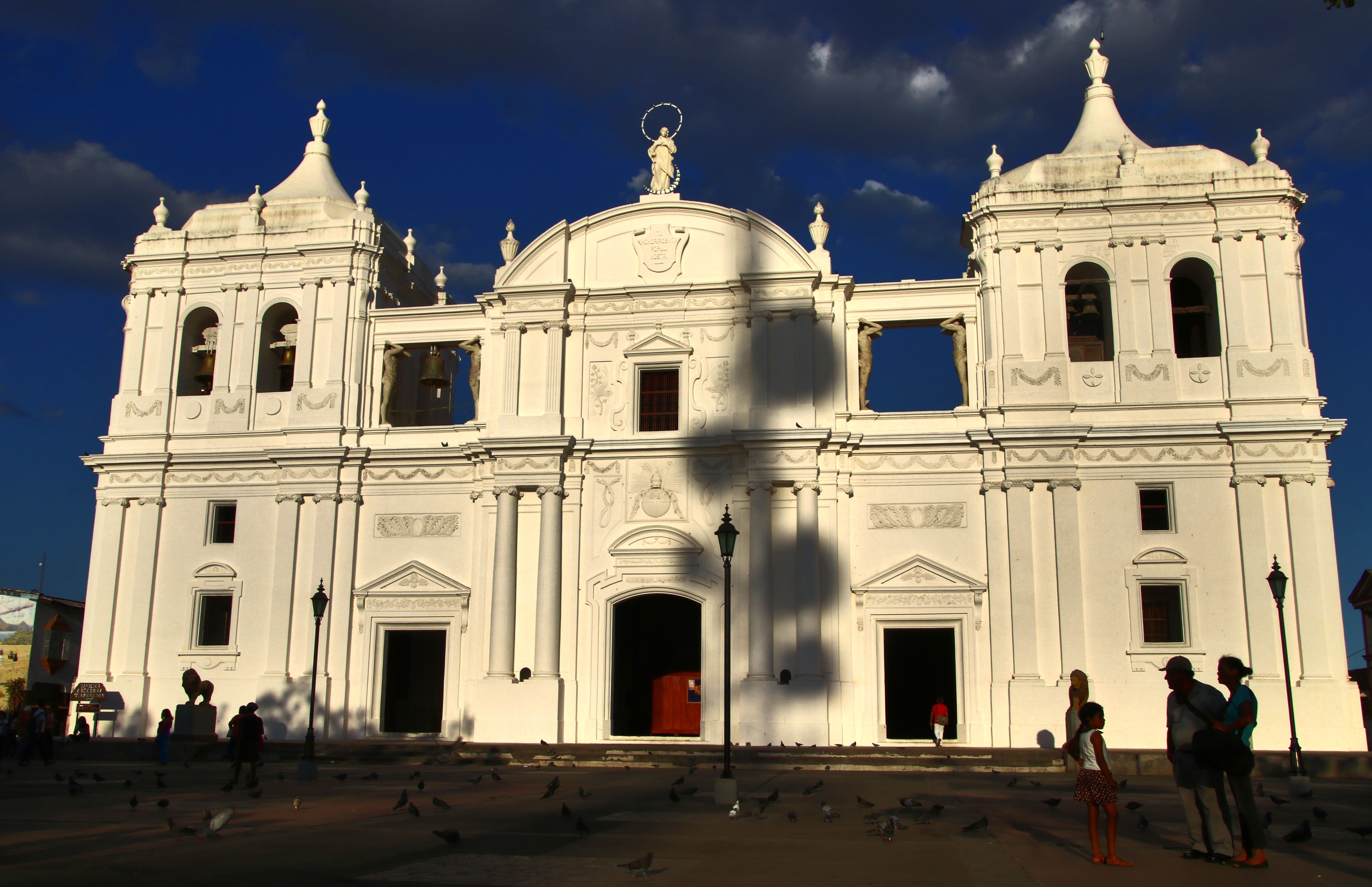
León Cathedral, a UNESCO World Heritage Site

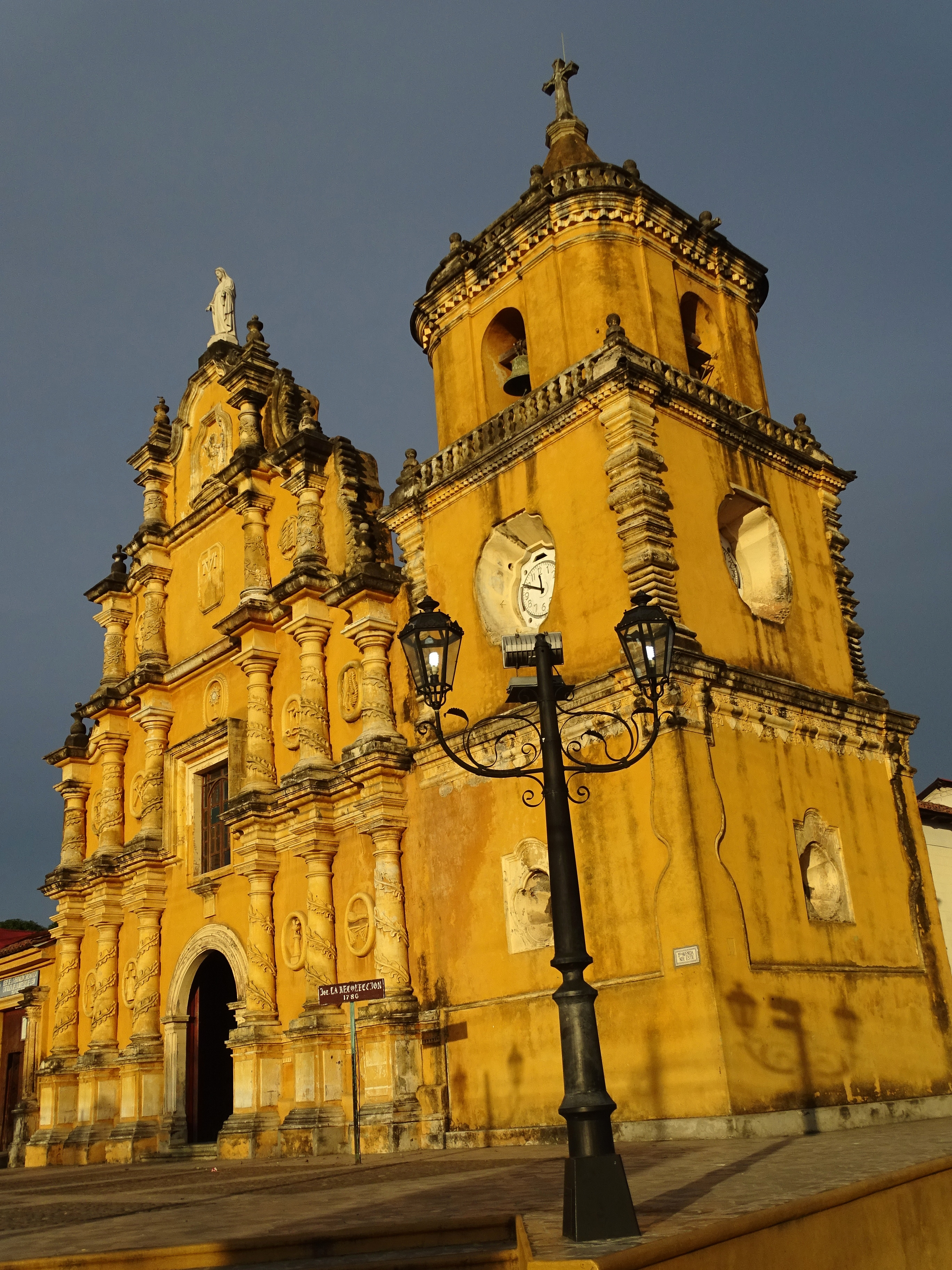
La Recolección Church

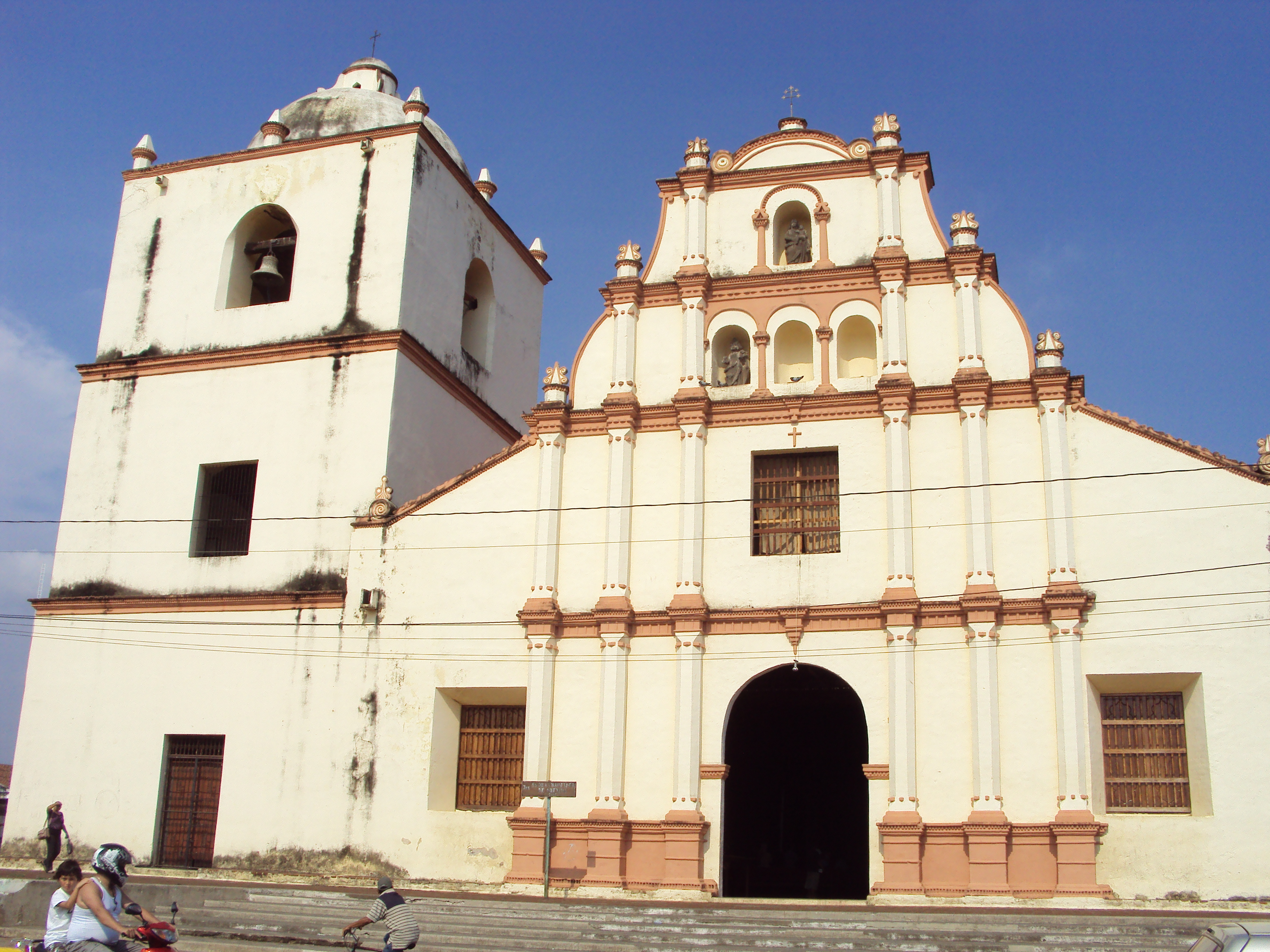
Iglesia San Juan Bautista Sutiava

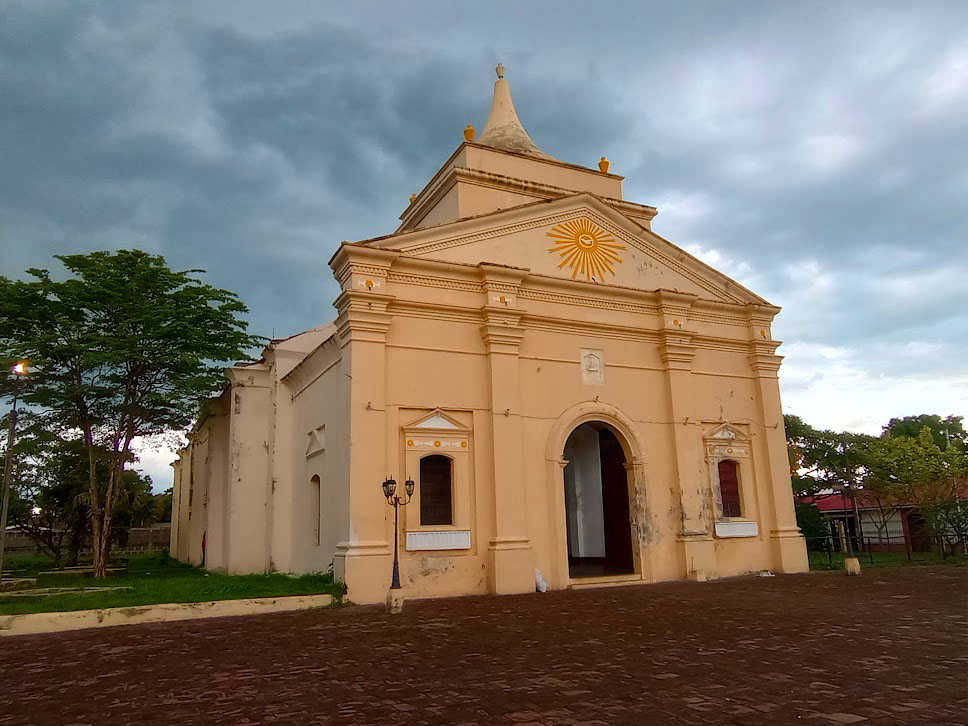
San Felipe Church

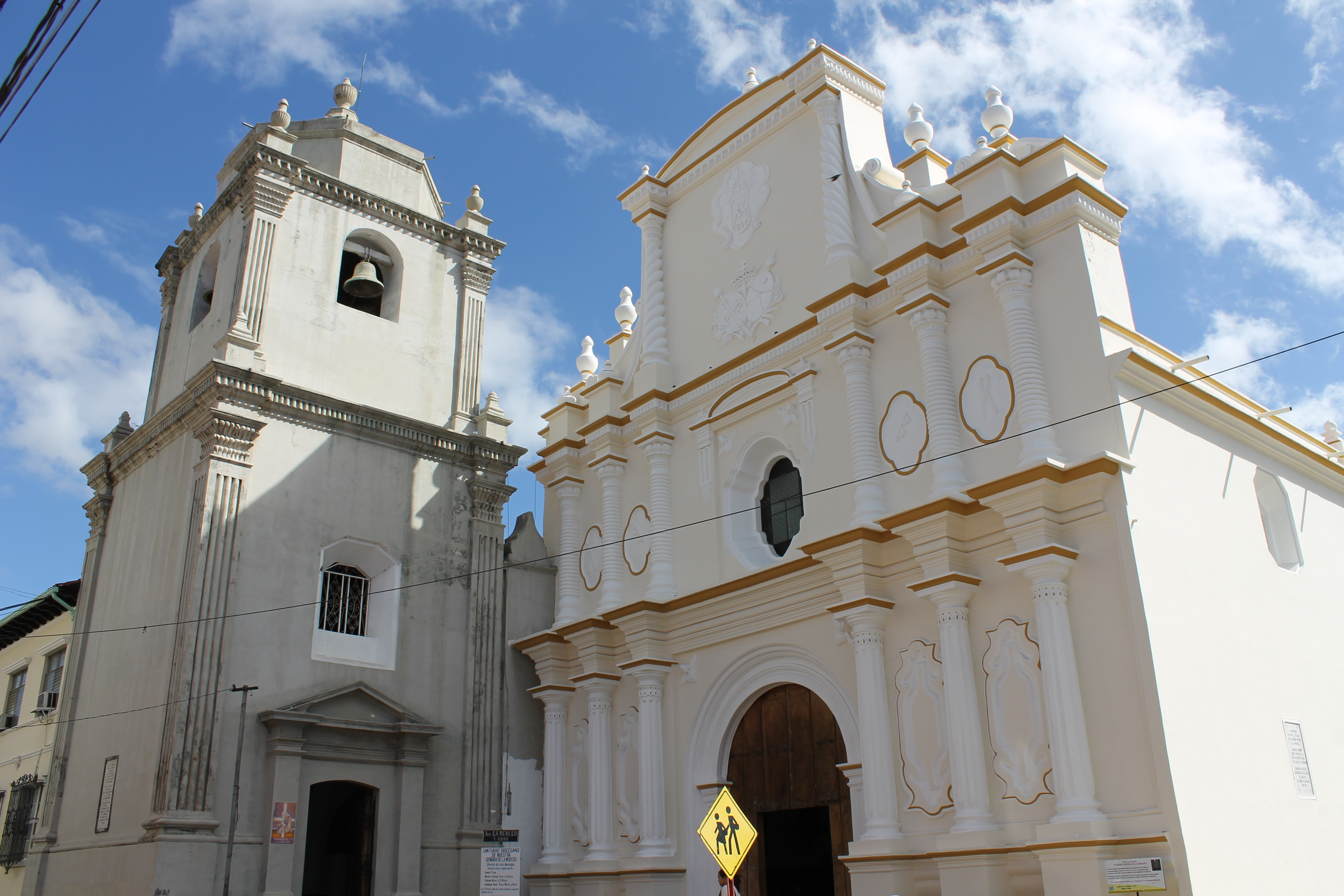
Nuestra Señora de La Merced Church

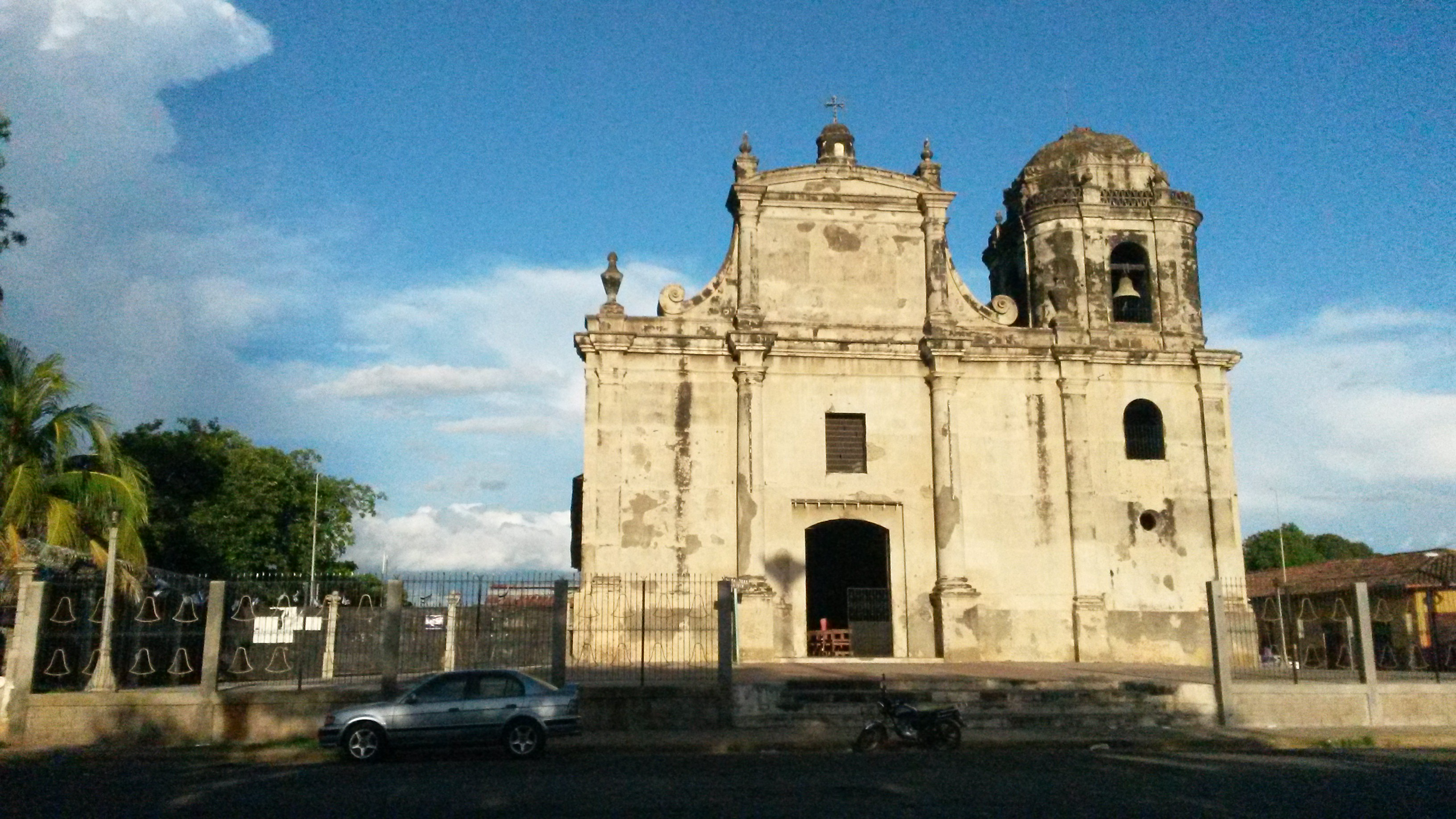
San Juan Apóstol church

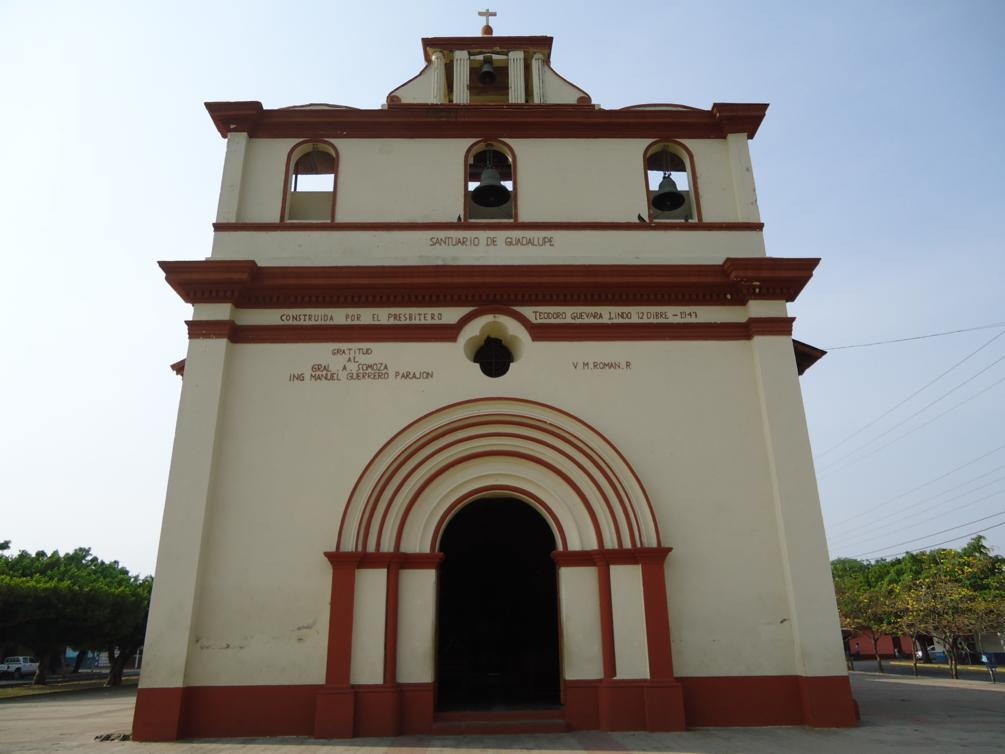
Guadalupe Church

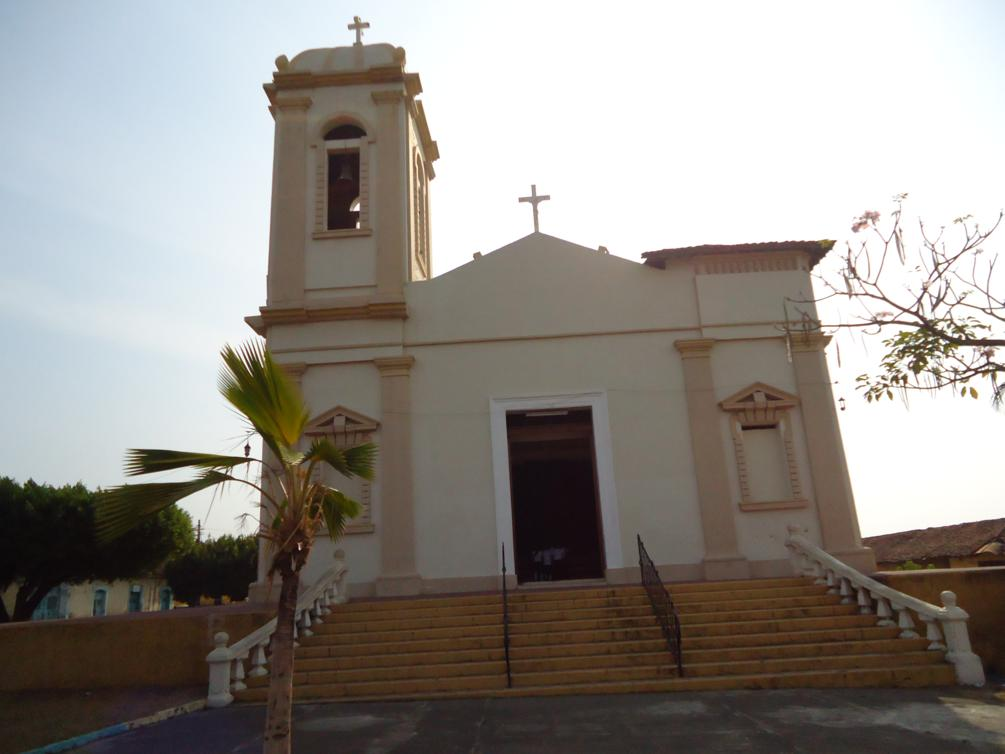
El Laborio Church

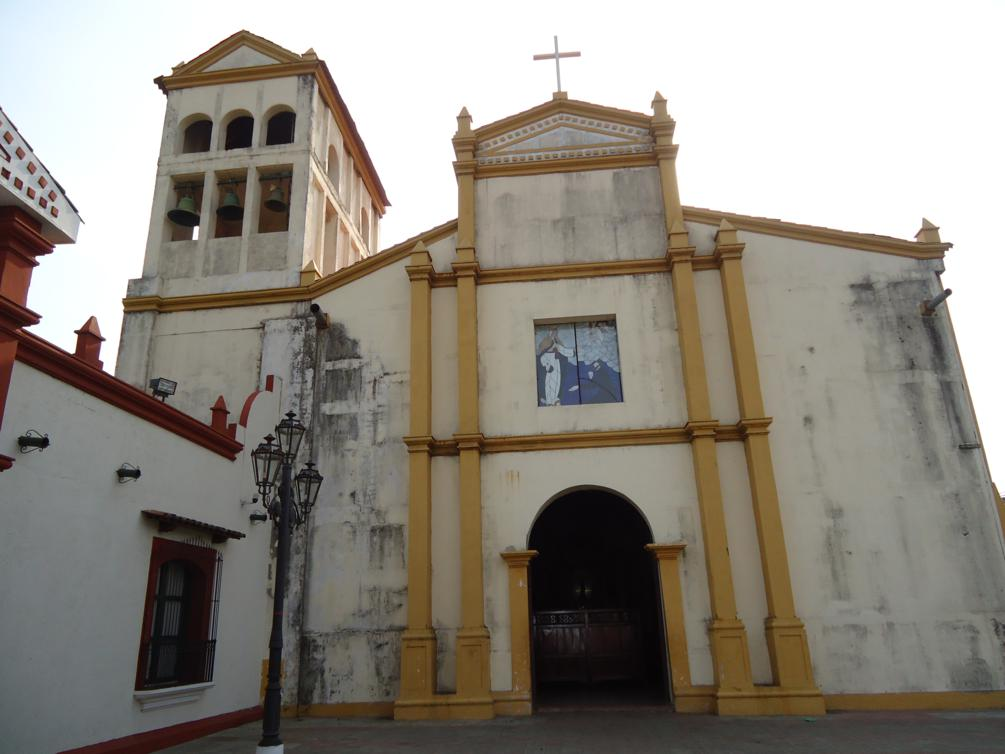
San Francisco Church

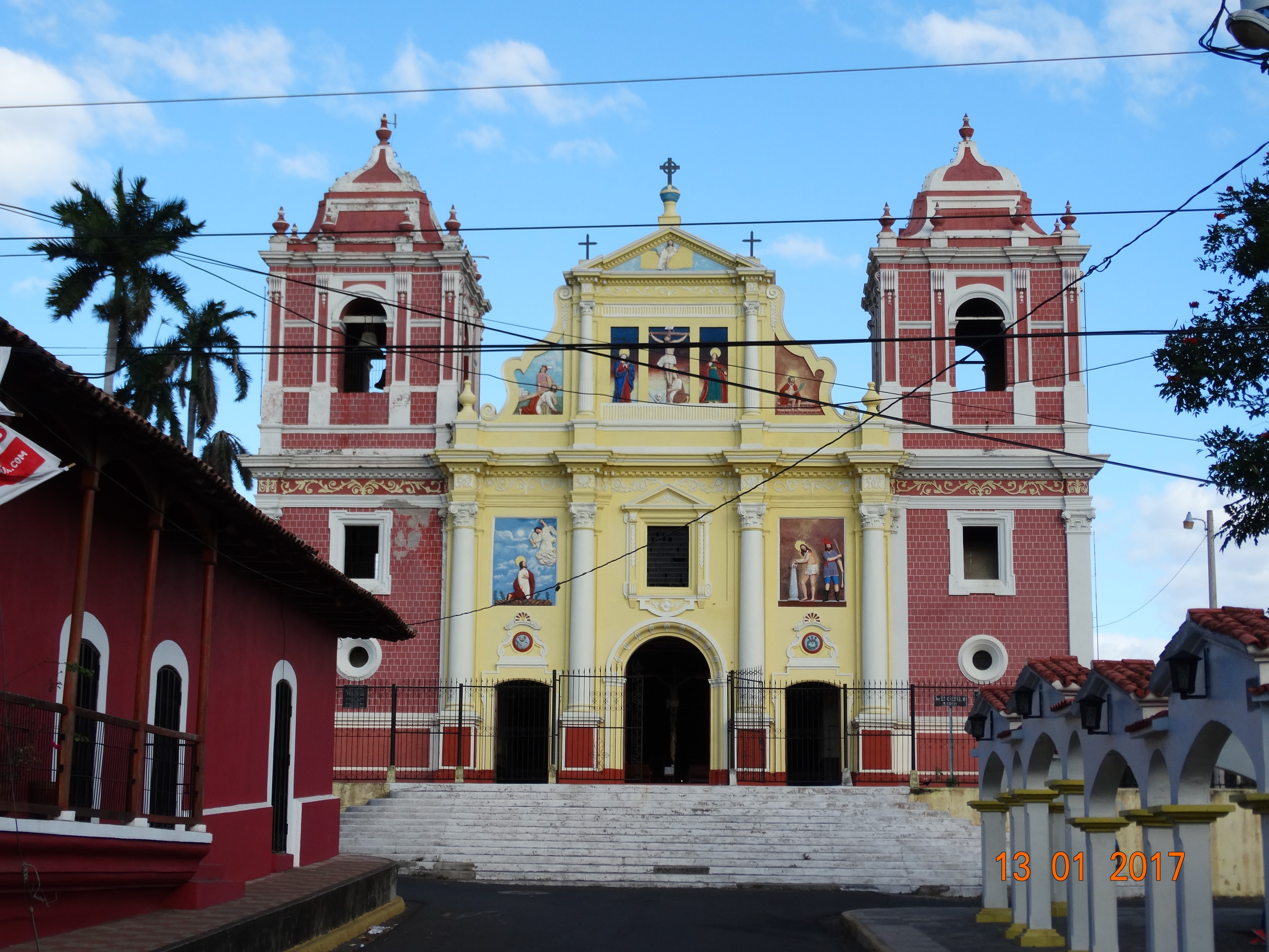
El Calvario church

León is rich in both monuments and historical places. Some architectural monuments include:

- Cárcel la 21 (Prison 21) was a jail located in the San Sebastian neighborhood of Leon. It was a detention center which housed political prisoners and was a symbol of torture. Construction began in 1910 and it was first occupied in 1921. The National Heroine Blanca Aráuz was incarcerated in the facility during the guerrilla insurgency following the Constitutionalist War. During the Somoza regime, it housed political prisoners and those who were "disappeared" by the Guardia Nacional. The façade of the building was destroyed during fighting between the National Guard and Sandinistas in 1979. Since 2000 the jail has served as an art museum, which also attracts visitors interested in the macabre.
- Cathedral Basilica of the Assumption of León, a typical colonial baroque building built between 1747 and 1814. Because of its solid, anti-seismic construction, its walls have endured earthquakes, eruptions of the Cerro Negro volcano, and bombings during civil wars. Several cannons were placed on the roof both during the siege of the city by conservative forces in 1824 and during the revolution of 1979 against president Anastasio Somoza Debayle.

The Assumption is the largest cathedral in Central America and has been the first episcopal seat of Nicaragua since 1531, making it one of the oldest dioceses in the Americas. In the cathedral's crypts are buried several illustrious figures, such as poet and diplomat Rubén Darío at the foot of the statue of St. Paul. Darío was the leading figure of the Modernism Poetic Movement of the late 1800s to early 1900s, and was declared the Prince of Spanish Letters by literary figures of the Spanish-speaking world. Other illustrious figures buried in the cathedral are the poets Salomón de la Selva and Alfonso Cortés, the father of Nicaragua's independence Miguel Larreynaga, classical composer and musician José de la Cruz Mena, and several bishops.

There are a number of tunnels that connect the cathedral with other temples that were used as hideouts or escape routes during attacks by British, Dutch, and French pirates. However, the tunnels are not accessible to the public, as some have been converted to the sewer system service. In the early 20th century, the first bishop of Leon and the last in Nicaragua, Archbishop Simeón Pereira y Castellón (the same who presided over the funeral of Darío on February 13, 1916) commissioned Granadan sculptor Jorge Navas Cordonero to make a statue of the Virgin Mary to crown the top the façade, and two pairs of Atlantean figures to support the beams that connect the central gable to the flanking bell towers. Navas also sculpted the statues of the twelve apostles inside, along with the columns of the central nave, and the lion at the tomb of Dario, which resembles the Lion of Lucerne in Switzerland. He also created several moldings in the interior walls and built the Tabernacle Chapel.

- Church of Sutiava is the oldest intact church in Leon considered the main temple after the cathedral. Its construction began in 1698, during magistrate Diego Rodríguez Menéndez's administration, and was completed 24 August 1710. In 1844, during a war with El Salvador, the tower dome was destroyed, but it was rebuilt in the early 20th century. The name of the church was formerly spelled "Subtiava" or "Subtiaba", but the neighborhood officially changed the spelling to "Sutiava" since people believed "sub" meant it was inferior. Architecturally, the church features a notable timber alfarje ceiling showcasing indigenous carpentry craft, incorporating a carved solar motif that reflects early colonial syncretism within the historic indigenous district.
- Church of San Francisco is part of the convent of San Francisco, one of the oldest in Nicaragua, founded in 1639 by Friar Pedro de Zúñiga. In the interior remain two good examples of plateresque altars. However, its main attraction is the courtyard. Built in pure, Leonese colonial style, this is a grassy expanse with an ashlar fountain at the center from which four radiating walkways, flanked by manicured lemon trees, lead to the surrounding porticoes where some of the columns are covered in red bougainvilleas. Towards the south, a line of royal palms shade the roof and complete the peaceful ensemble.
- Church of la Recolección, construction began on 5 December 1786, by Bishop Juan Félix de Villegas thanks to contributions made by parishioners. Its Mexican baroque façade is considered one of the most important in the city. The interior also contains one of the best baroque altarpieces in the city highlighted with paintings and silver engravings.
- Church of la Merced, in 1762 the Mercedarian fathers built the first convent and church, but these were later demolished. In the 18th century, the present Church of la Merced was erected with drawings attributed to Mercedario Friar Pedro de Ávila and conducted by master builder Pascual Somarriba. Adjacent to the north side of la Merced is the Paraninfo (former Mercedarion convent) built in beautifully delicate baroque style, which is now UNAN's main administrative building.
- Church of el Calvario, a fantasy of textures and colors of pure Leonese baroque. The façade consists of a central body, painted off-yellow with white trimming supported by white, half columns. The gable contains high reliefs of the passion of Christ. The two flanking bell towers painted Burgundy red and highlighted with white grooving, are made up of reliefs representing bricks. The central body contains a central Roman arch door flanked by two smaller, flat ones. They are all separated by columns, topped by a frieze covered in white garlands. The interiors are a pleasant soft white to keep them cool during the long, hot, and dry Leonese summers. The ceiling, also white, is highlighted by red and yellow outlining in the shape of crosses, leaves, and flowers. Built by the illustrious Mayorga family, el Calvario dates from the first half of the 18th century and it is one of Leon's architectural jewels at the east end of calle Real or "Main Street".
- Ruins of the Church of San Sebastián, built in the late 17th century as a chapel of the Cathedral, San Sebastián's was one of the first religious buildings in the city. Rebuilt in the late 18th century by Colonel Joaquín Arrechavala, it was bombed during the revolution in 1979. Since it was built with adobe bricks, San Sebastián was easily destroyed, unlike other churches built of brick or stone which endured shootings and bombings.
- Church of Guadalupe, built in the late 19th century under the auspices of father Villamil replacing an 18th-century hermitage, it is of simple construction, in keeping with the sobriety of the Franciscans.
- Church of Zaragoza, with an atrium and lateral corridor, its construction began in the late 19th century and ended in the mid-20th century by Bishop Salmerón; the façade was designed by Dr. Francisco Mateo.
- Church of San Felipe, a large building that occupies an entire block, it was built in 1685 for blacks and mulatto worshipers. In 1859, it underwent an extensive expansion that gave it its present form, whereas the tower was restored in 1983.
- Church Hermitage of San Pedro, a small building with typical late, colonial architecture of the 18th century. It was built between 1706 and 1718 by mayor Bartolomé González Fitoria, replacing the original church of San Pedro that was part of a set of four primitive hermitages in Subtiava.
- Church of San Nicolás Tolentino del Laborío, Philip III of Spain ordered its construction in 1618. It was built in very light, Colonial baroque style.
- Chapel of la Asunción, part of the school of the same name, it was built in 1679 by Bishop Andrés de las Navas y Quevedo, and used as an episcopal palace. Later it was occupied by the Mothers of the Assumption. In 1935 it underwent deep alterations that led to its current appearance: a mix of early colonial baroque for the side wings, and neo-Gothic for the central chapel.
- Hotel Esfinge building designed by Nicaraguan architect José María Ibarra as an upscale hotel.
- Esquivel House, built in the 19th century, it belonged to Father Mariano Dubón. Architectural details and decorations around the house makes it a unique structure in the city. It now belongs to the Esquivel Family and it is categorized as a high-class residence.
- Colegio de San Ramón, of symmetrical façade and Renaissance influences, it has been rebuilt several times after being damaged by earthquakes. Although historically a seminary college since the 1600s, it has now been incorporated to UNAN.
- City Hall, built in 1935, it was damaged during the revolution of 1979. The building was designed in Art Deco style by architect Marcelo Targa, and was built during the administration of then president Juan Bautista Sacasa. It is a building of important architectural value.

Other remarkable buildings and places include: the walls of Guadalupe Cemetery, Guadalupe Bridge, the Debayle Museum, the Diocesan Archives, the Mena Theater, the Posada Colonial (a baroque structure in business since 1823), the old Train Station, the San Vicente Hospital, and the Subtiava Rural House.

- León Viejo, the ruins of the original city of León which was buried by an eruption of the Momotombo volcano in 1610. It was founded in 1524 by Francisco Hernández de Córdoba, and is situated 30 kilometres (19 miles) from the actual city of León. It is a World Heritage Site and its founder is buried there, in a crypt beneath his statue, along with other figures including Pedrarias Dávila who had ordered his assassination.
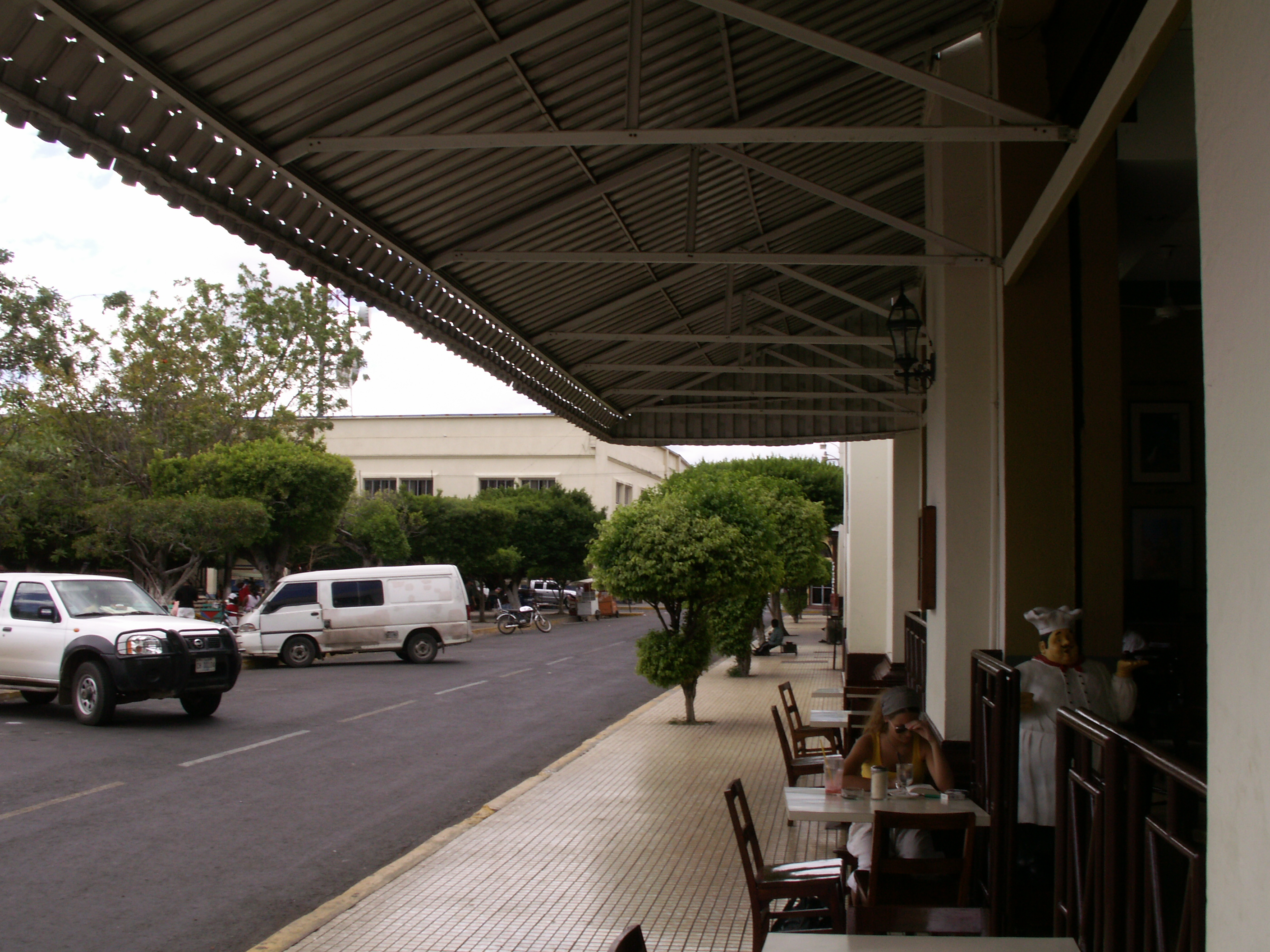
Sesteo Restaurant near Cathedral and Main Square.

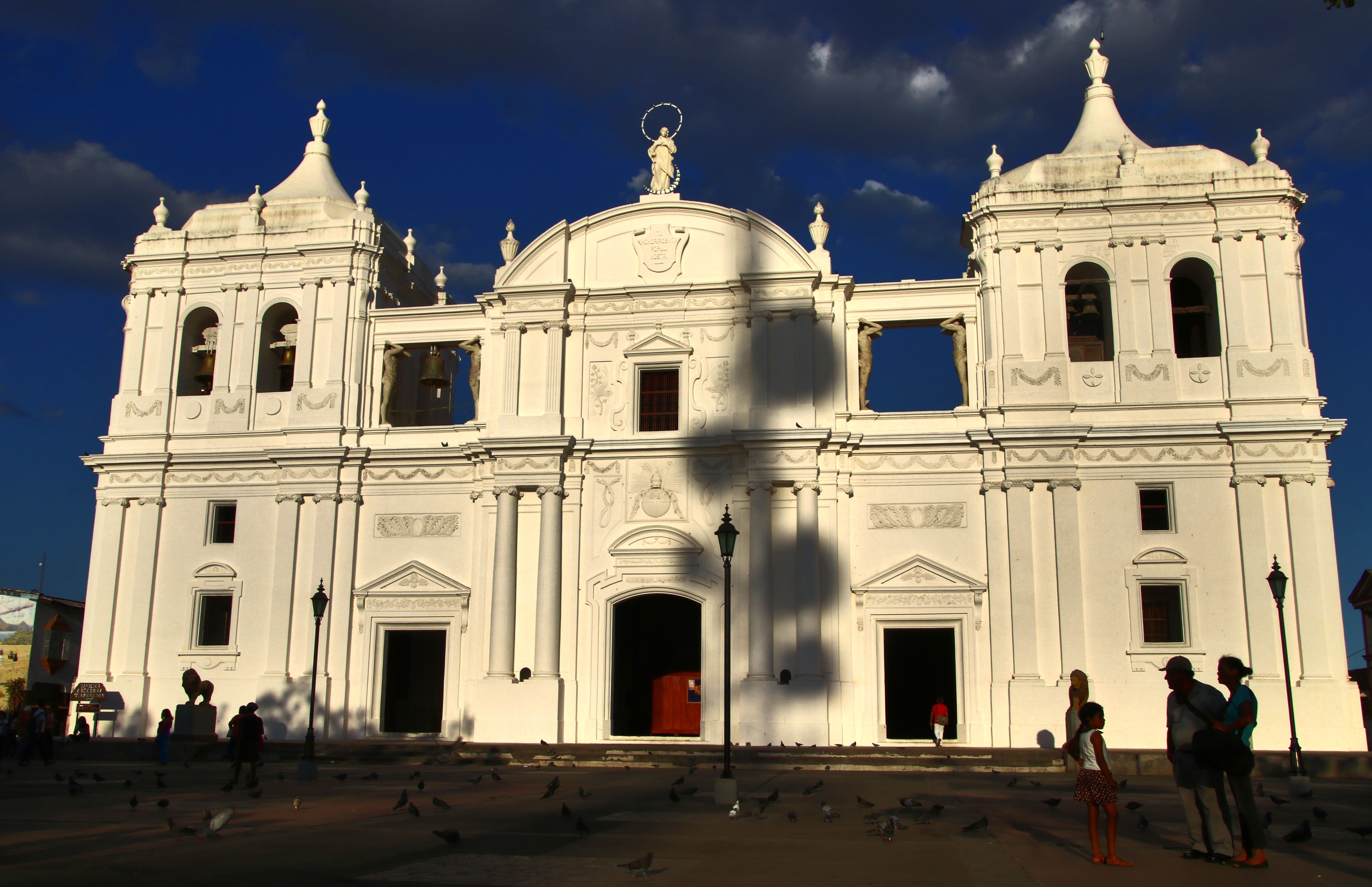
Cathedral Basilica of the Assumption of León.

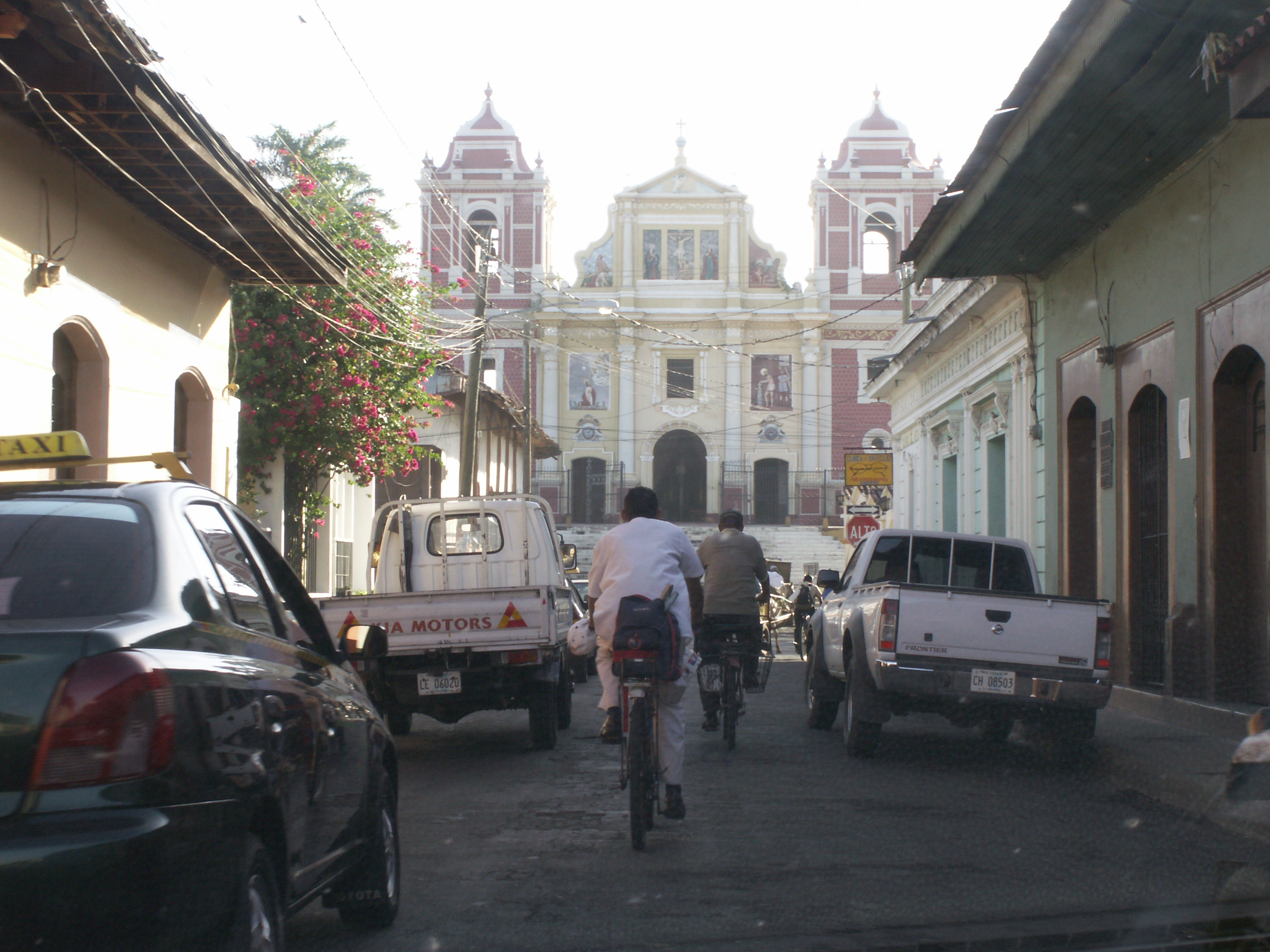
Church El Calvario.

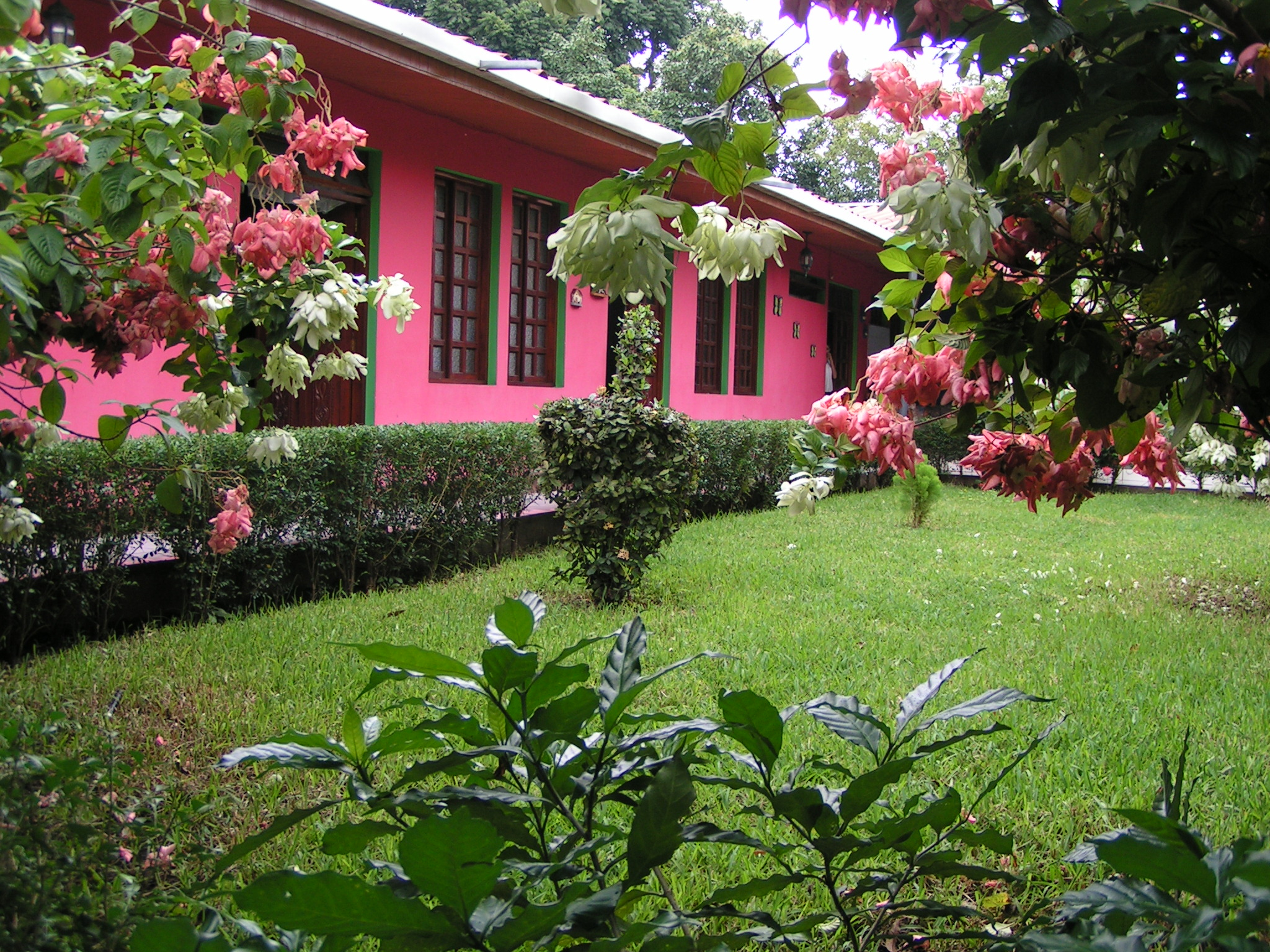
Spanish colonial home.

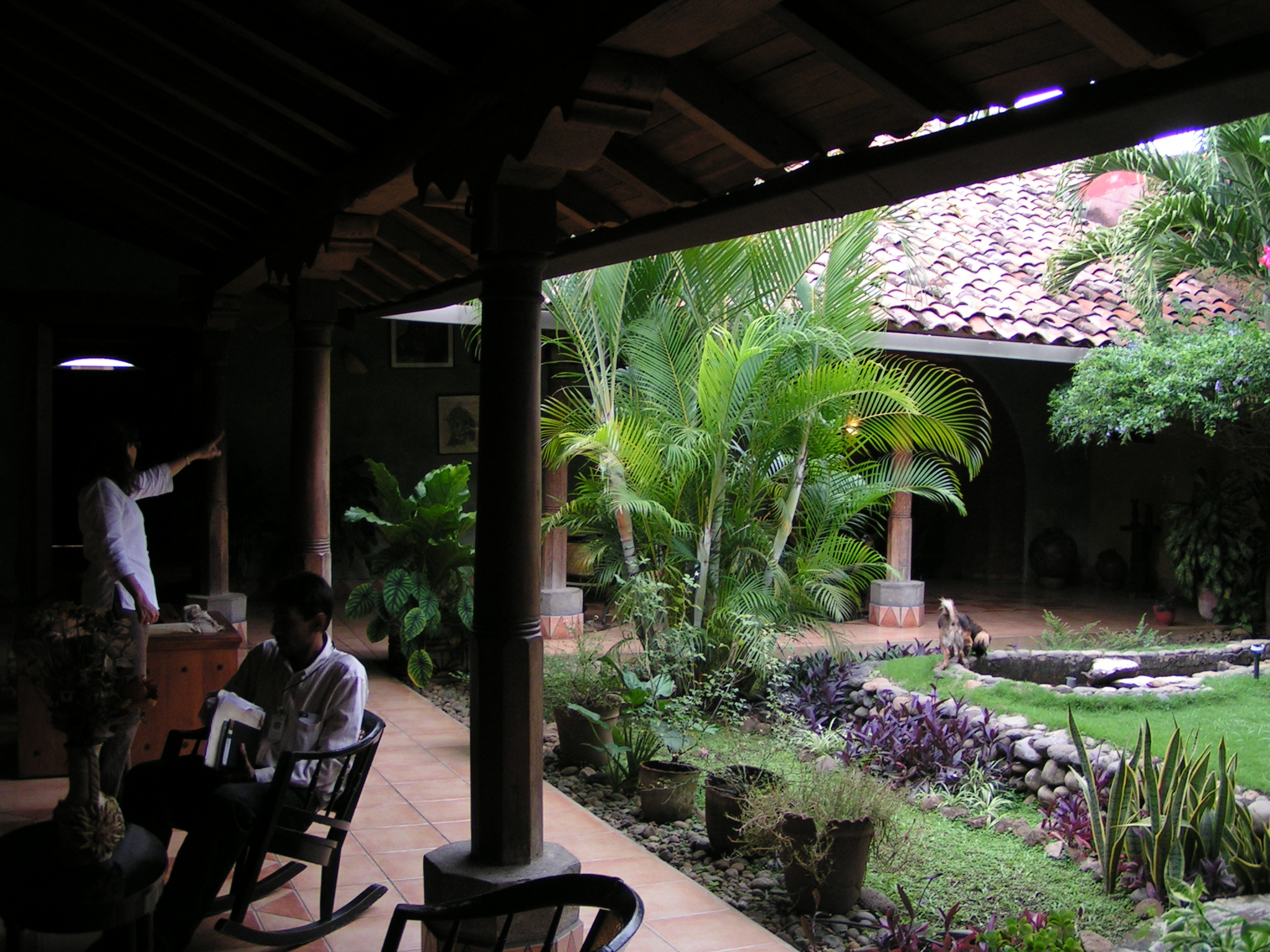
Spanish colonial home.

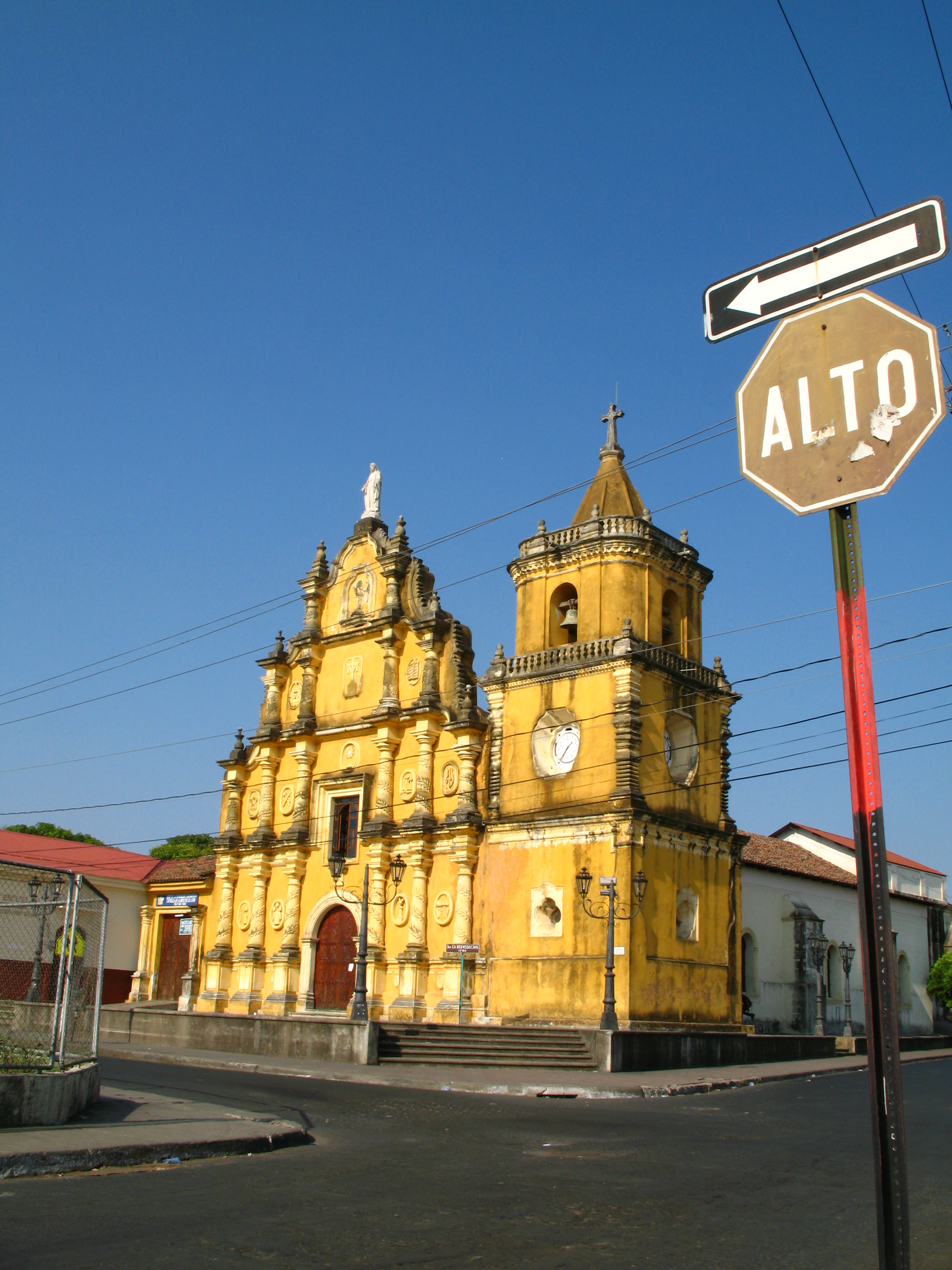
Church of La Recolección

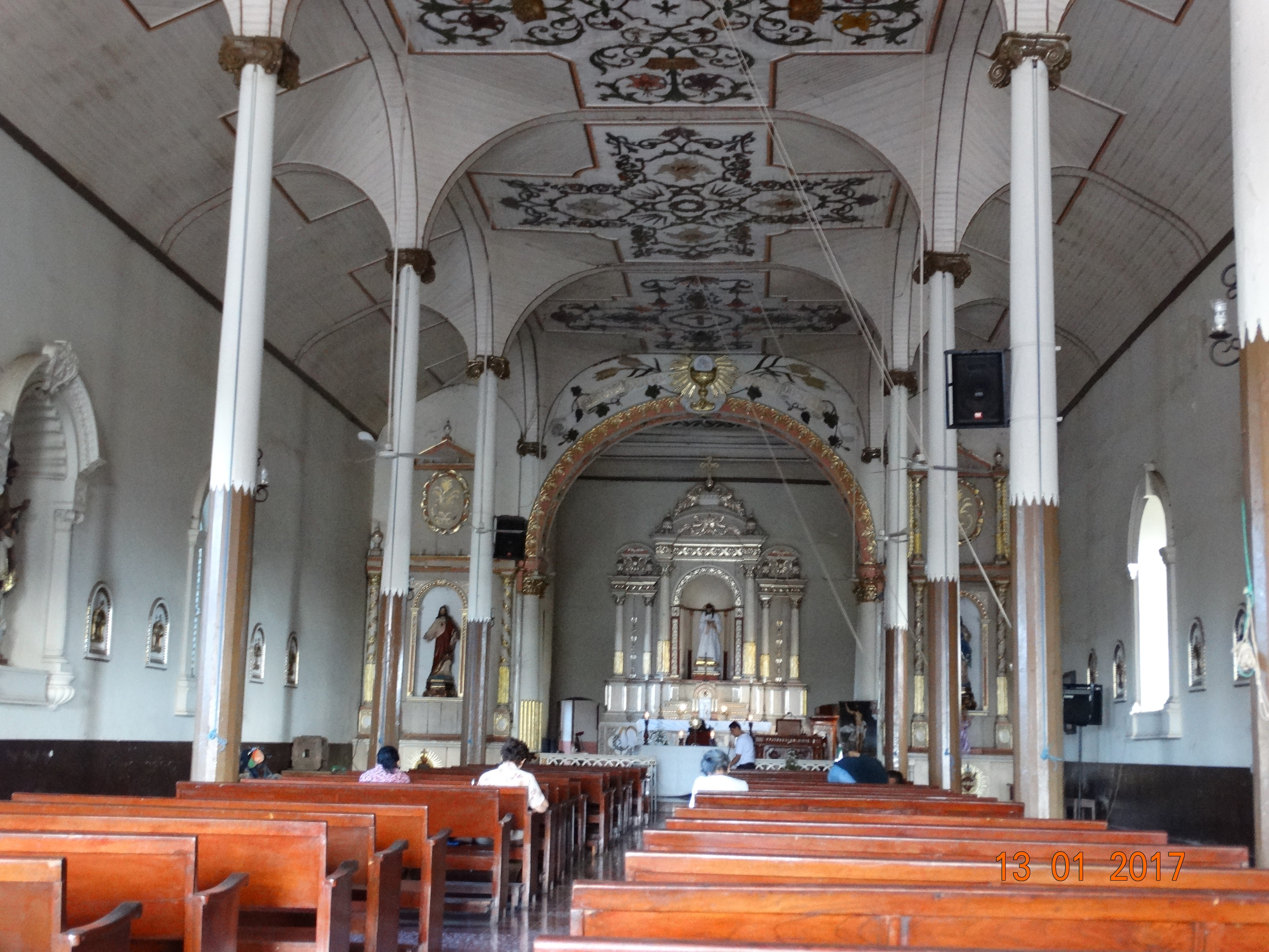
El Calvario (interior view)

== Geography ==
Leon sits in the coastal lowlands of northwestern Nicaragua with volcanoes and hills of the central highlands in view to the east.

Geological features around Leon include:

- Poneloya beach, a major tourist destination on the Pacific Ocean.
- San Jacinto Swarms, geothermal place at the base of the Santa Clara volcano which form part of its vents. This phenomenon is known as Thermal sharpen to simmer.
- Momotombo volcano, with its 1,300 m (4,270 ft) summit, it is a visual reference in the Leonese landscape. At its feet lies León Viejo. The Momotombo name is a Native American word for "Great Summit Burning". There is a geothermal power plant on the foothills.
- Cerro Negro volcano, one of the youngest in the world (1850), Cerro Negro has wrought havoc several times to the city of León and its surrounding area, since it was born with long, sky-clogging, and destructive ashfalls, the most recent in 1995.
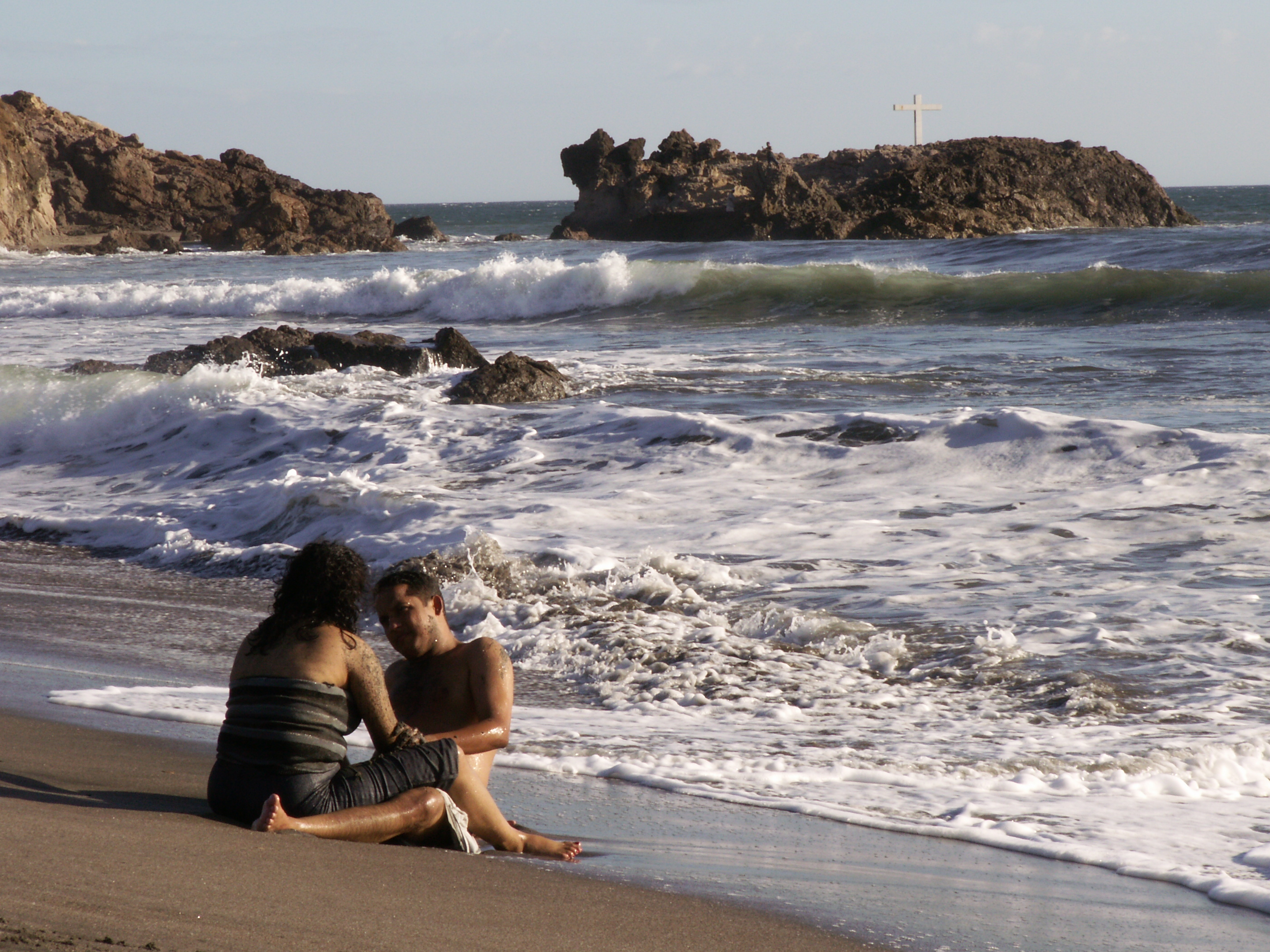
Couple at Poneloya Beach, just outside León.

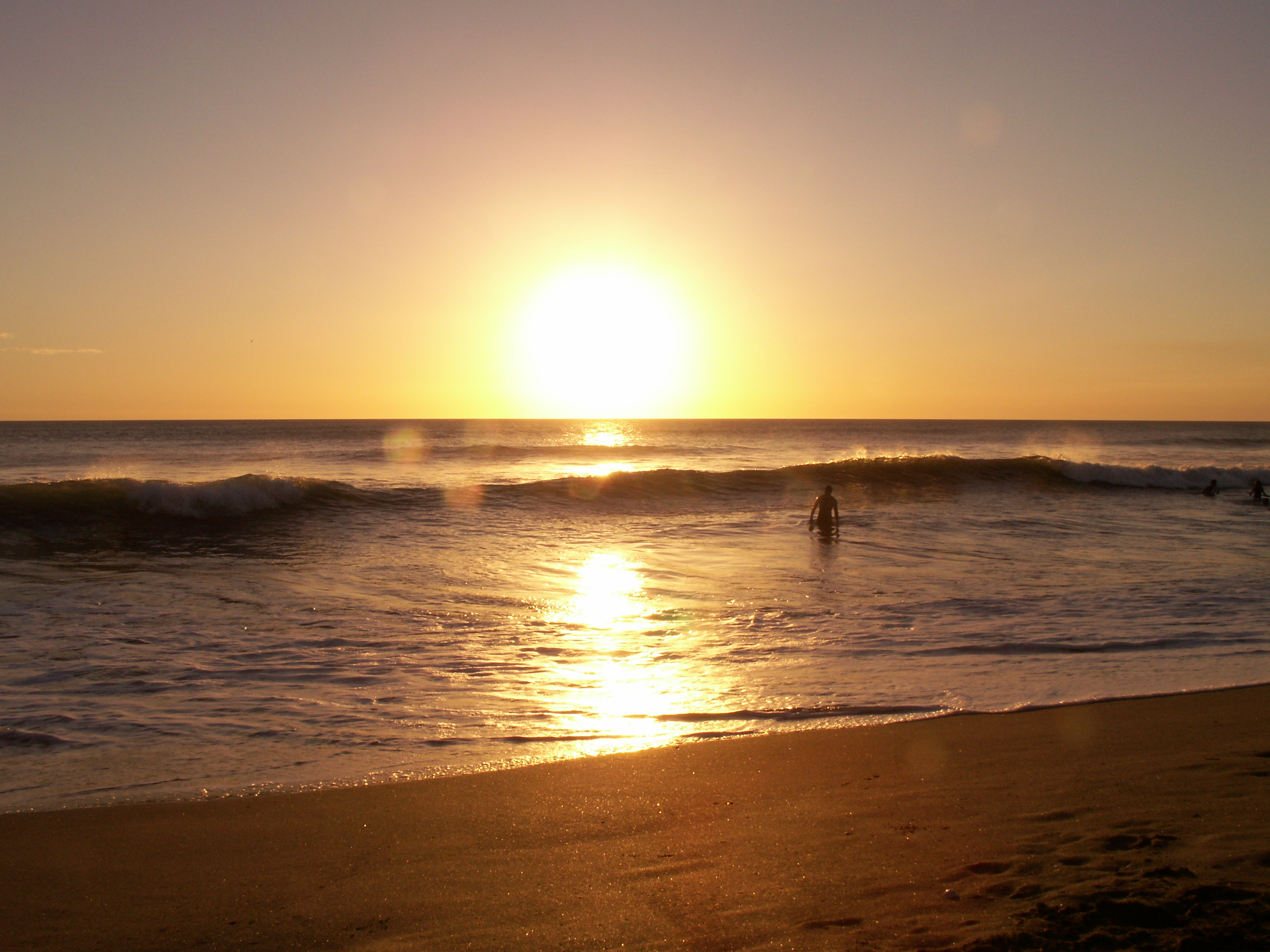
Poneloya Beach, just outside Leon at sunset.

=== Climate ===
León has a tropical savanna climate (Köppen: Aw). The average annual temperature is 31.3 °C or 88.3 °F and yearly cumulative rainfall is 2,000 millimetres or 79 inches.

Climate data for Leon
| Month | Jan | Feb | Mar | Apr | May | Jun | Jul | Aug | Sep | Oct | Nov | Dec | Year |
|---|---|---|---|---|---|---|---|---|---|---|---|---|---|
| Mean daily maximum °C (°F) | 31.7 (89.1) | 32.3 (90.1) | 32.8 (91.0) | 32.7 (90.9) | 31.4 (88.5) | 30.7 (87.3) | 31.7 (89.1) | 31.2 (88.2) | 30.0 (86.0) | 29.6 (85.3) | 30.3 (86.5) | 31.2 (88.2) | 31.3 (88.4) |
| Daily mean °C (°F) | 27.7 (81.9) | 28.1 (82.6) | 28.6 (83.5) | 28.8 (83.8) | 28.0 (82.4) | 27.4 (81.3) | 28.1 (82.6) | 27.6 (81.7) | 26.7 (80.1) | 26.5 (79.7) | 26.7 (80.1) | 27.2 (81.0) | 27.6 (81.7) |
| Mean daily minimum °C (°F) | 23.9 (75.0) | 24.3 (75.7) | 24.9 (76.8) | 25.6 (78.1) | 25.3 (77.5) | 24.8 (76.6) | 25.1 (77.2) | 24.8 (76.6) | 24.3 (75.7) | 24.1 (75.4) | 23.8 (74.8) | 23.7 (74.7) | 24.5 (76.2) |
| Average precipitation mm (inches) | 2.8 (0.11) | 2.8 (0.11) | 9.4 (0.37) | 43.7 (1.72) | 290.6 (11.44) | 305.6 (12.03) | 152.0 (5.98) | 247.8 (9.76) | 376.7 (14.83) | 413.9 (16.30) | 143.1 (5.63) | 11.5 (0.45) | 1,999.9 (78.73) |
| Mean monthly sunshine hours | 292.3 | 276.0 | 306.7 | 295.8 | 274.7 | 254.1 | 283.2 | 274.8 | 247.7 | 236.8 | 253.2 | 274.2 | 3,269.5 |
Source: Weather.Directory

== Sports ==
In November 2026, León co-hosted the 2026 U-23 Baseball World Cup along with two other Nicaraguan cities, Managua and Masaya.

== Notable people ==
- José de la Cruz Mena, classical composer (1874–1907).
- Azarías Pallais, poet and literary figure (1884–1954).
- Luis Pallais Debayle, politician (born 1930)
- Alfonso Cortés, poet (1893–1969).
- Salomón of the Jungle, poet, writer, diplomat, translated W Whitman to Spanish (1893–1959).
- Antenor Sandino, metaphysical poet (1899–1969).
- Anastasio Somoza Debayle, Nicaraguan president (1st term: 1967–1972, 2nd term: 1974–1979).
- Enrique Bermúdez, Contra leader (1932–1991).
- Dr. Jose Venancio Berrios Obregon. Las Penitas Beach Founder (1960). Political Chief of Leon, Nicaragua (1900-1979)
- Madre Adela Galindo
- José Areas, percussionist, played timbales in the Latin rock group Santana in 1969–1977 and 1987–1989 (1946-today).

== International relations ==
=== Twin towns and sister cities ===
León is twinned with:

| Hamburg, Germany; Oxford, United Kingdom; (United States) Gettysburg, Pennsylvania, USA; (United States) New Haven, Connecticut, USA; Raleigh, United States | Lund, Sweden; Alicante, Spain; (United States) Janesville, Wisconsin, USA; León, Mexico; Salzburg, Austria |

== See also ==
- León Viejo (archaeological site)
