= Samayoa =

Samayoa is a surname.

Notable people with the surname include:

- Caesar Samayoa, American stage actor
- Carlos Samayoa Chinchilla (1898–1973), Guatemalan writer
- David Samayoa (born 1992), Canadian weightlifter
- Edgar Godoy Samayoa (1949–2021), Guatemalan politician
- Emilio Samayoa (born 1964), Guatemalan sprinter
- Fernando Samayoa (born 1989), Mexican football manager
- José Carlos Pinto Samayoa (born 1993), Guatemalan footballer
- José Eulalio Samayoa (1781-c.1866), Guatemalan classical composer
- José Ramiro Pellecer Samayoa (1929–2022), Guatemalan Roman Catholic auxiliary bishop
- Juana Samayoa (born 1948), American actress and television presenter
- Nicolás Samayoa (born 1995), Guatemalan footballer
