= Miguel Larreynaga =

Nicaraguan philosopher

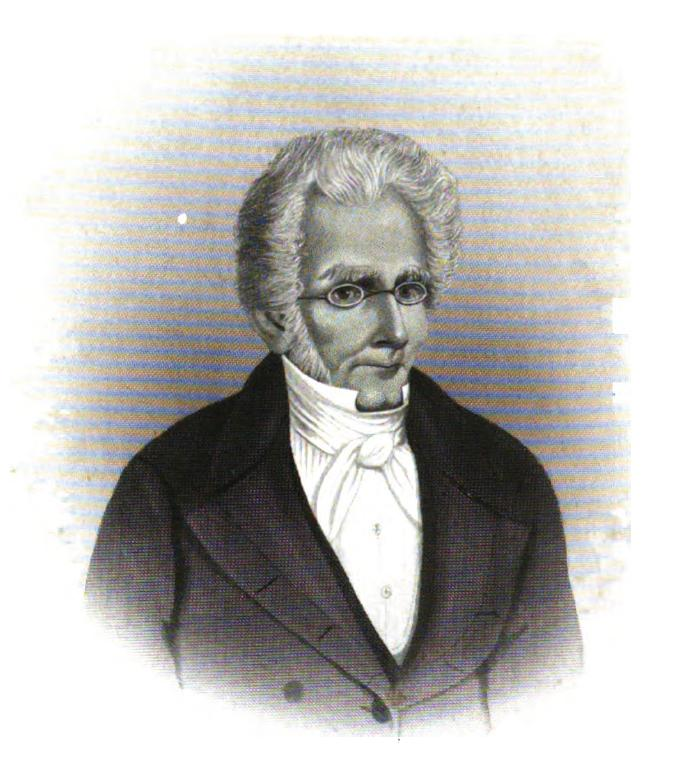

Miguel Jerónimo Larreinaga y Silva (April 29, 1771 – April 28, 1847) was a Nicaraguan philosopher, humanist, lawyer and poet. He was one of the people who traveled to Spain in 1818 to ask for independence of the Central American Republic, which was granted to Nicaragua and four other countries in 1821. He is depicted on the obverse of the current C$10 Córdoba note in Nicaragua.

Miguel Larreinaga was born in León, Nicaragua. His father was Joaquín Larreinaga, who was Spanish and died before his birth, and his mother was Manuela Balmaceda y Silva who died in childbirth. His paternal grandfather adopted and educated him.

Larreinaga died on April 20, 1847. His remains are buried under the floor of Our Lady of Grace Cathedral, León.
