= Villar de Chinchilla =

Coordinates: 38°54′N 1°31′W

Villar de Chinchilla is a village in Albacete, Castile-La Mancha, Spain.
