= Maya Chinchilla =

American poet

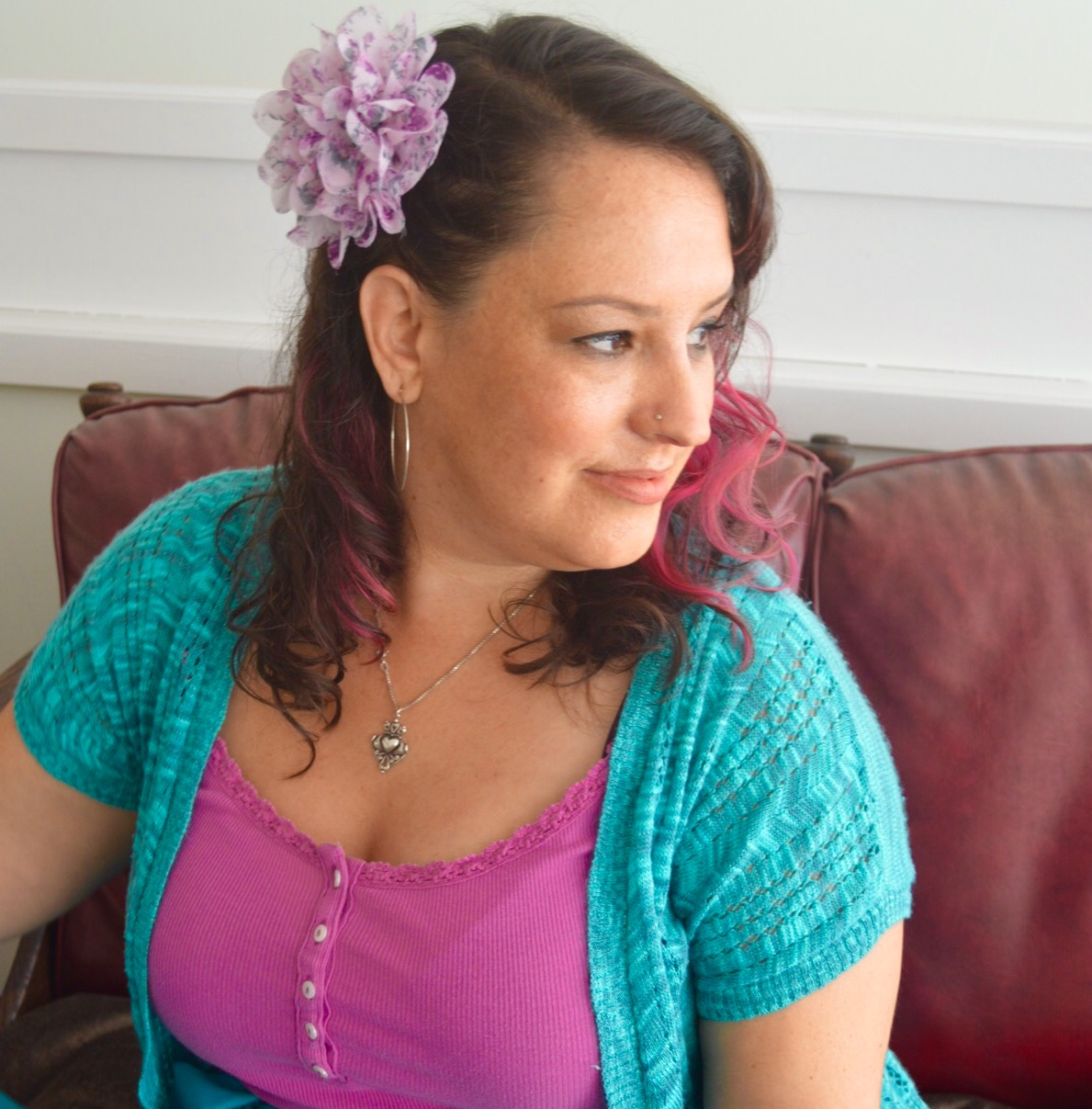
Maya Chinchilla at Studio Grand 2015

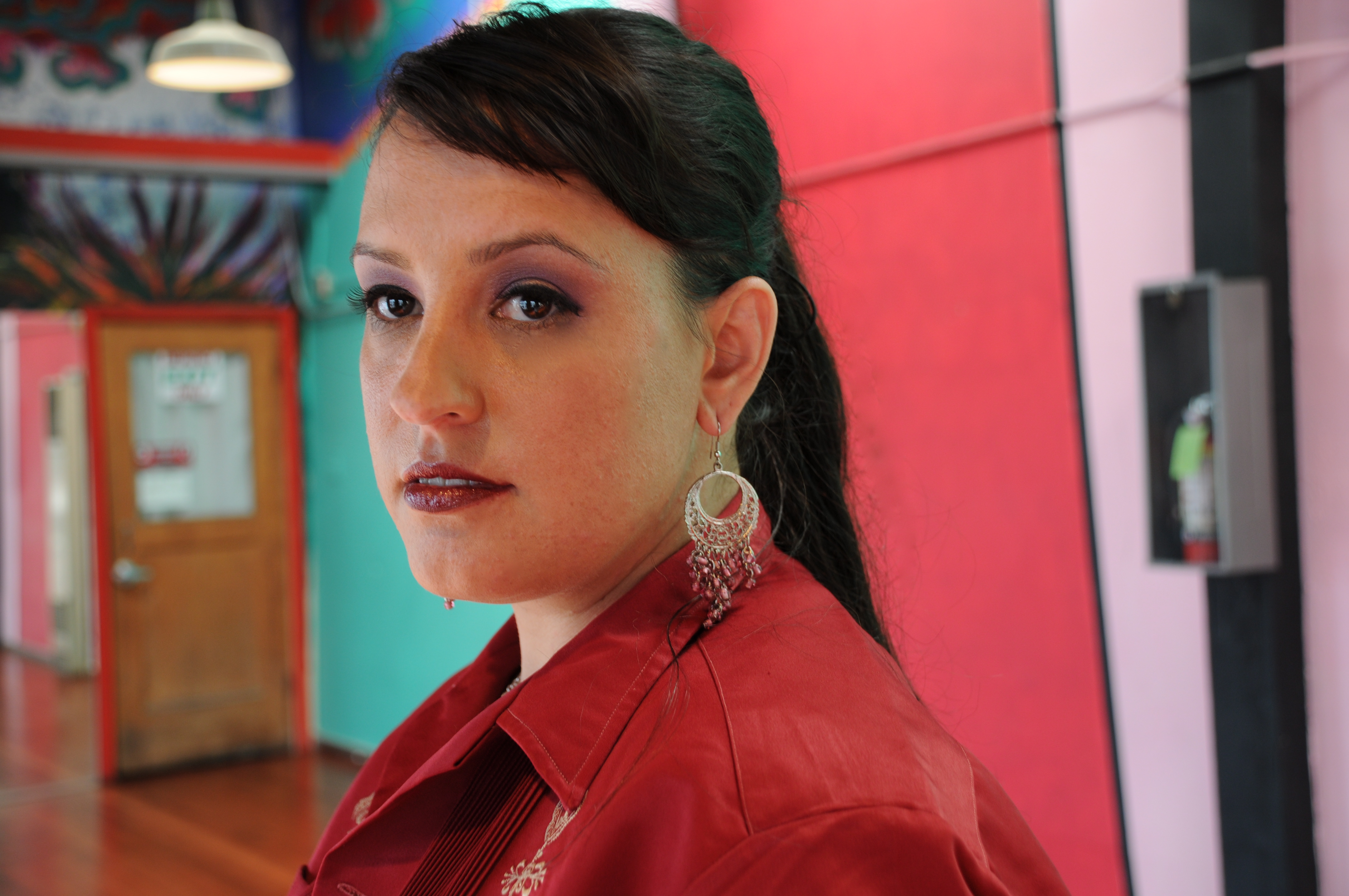
photo at SOMARTS 2009

Maya Chinchilla is a Bay Area-based American poet best known as one of the founders of EpiCentroAmerica and for writing The Cha Cha files: A Chapina Poética. She is of mixed American, German, and Guatemalan heritages. She was a lecturer at University of California, Santa Cruz where she developed courses on Central Americans in Diaspora and Creative Writing. Chinchilla is also a lecturer at the University of California Davis in the department of Chicano Studies.

== Background and education ==
Maya Chinchilla was born in Long Beach, California to an immigrant family with Guatemalan roots. Her mother, sociologist Dr. Norma Chinchilla and her father founded the Guatemala Information Center (GIC). Chinchilla's family such as her mother grew up noting the invisibility that many non-Mexican Latinos face in the United States, and how many end up trying to "pass" as Mexican in order to receive benefits. Chinchilla received a Bachelor of Arts from University of California Santa Cruz, a Masters in Broadcasting and Electronic Communications Arts from San Francisco State University, and a Masters of Fine Arts in English and Creative Writing from Mills College.

== Work ==
=== Scholarly work and critical reception ===
The literary collective, EpiCentroAmerica or epicentros, emerged in the 1990s as a space to give Central American American youth to explore their identity. It has been described as fundamental to the movement to reimagine Central American and Central American American identity in the literary arts in the early 21st century. An associated 2007 anthology, Desde el EpiCentro, which was edited by Chinchilla and Karina Oliva-Alvarado, has been described as critical in troubling traditional understandings of Latino identity. Chinchilla is able to create a conceptual theory of queerness by asking and expanding on dominant beliefs on what, who, and where is Central America.

She has had multiple publications in various journals and anthologies, including Mujeres de Maíz, Sinister Wisdom, Americas y Latinas: A Stanford Journal of Latin American Studies, Cipactli Journal, The Lunada Literary Anthology The Wandering Song: Central American Writing in the U.S. Some of Chinchilla's research interests are Latin American/Latino Studies, Gender and sexuality, Latinx discourse and cultural production, creative writing and performance, Central American Studies, Latino/as in the media, Film production and Aesthetics, Media and Communications.

Chinchilla has directed two short documentaries, "The Last Word" and "Made in Brazil" both of which screened at different festivals in 2006. When she was a graduate student at San Francisco State University, she also won the STAND award in 2006 from the Film Arts Foundation.

=== The Cha Cha Files (2014) ===
The Cha Cha Files is a collection of poems that brings to light the Diaspora of the Central American in the United States. The book is a queer text that uses erotic language and writing, while using autobiographical references to emphasize the struggles of the Central American Woman. In addition she discusses gender performance while articulating and reclaiming her mestiza and indigenous roots.

Through her work in the Cha Cha Files, Chinchilla uses her poetry to delve into the complexities having an intersection of identity between having Guatemalan identity and living in the United States, especially as a queer person. Within the 4 parts of her collection of poems, she uses various literary tactics to discuss an "in-between" space of home and identity between these intersections. As Chinchilla describes such as status as a "Central-American American," she further looks at connections and similarities between North and Central America through themes like gender and queer identity while still acknowledging power imbalances between the continents. She attempts to break down barriers between what is described as the "borderlands" by playing with language and linguistics in her writing between Spanish accents and spelling.

She articulates a wide range of conflicting emotions through her writing as she grapples with her own status, such as challenging readers about stereotypes, and longing for her home and heritage. She writes to demonstrate the struggles of the modern-day immigrant in the United States through vulnerability and fostering community. Her poems also emphasize the hardships of dealing with the conflict and violence that occurs both in Guatemala, but also in the US towards migrants.

=== Other literary works ===
Church at Night was written by Maya Chinchilla after the Orlando nightclub shooting. In 2018, the poem was published in A Journal of Lesbian and Gay Studies.

Femme on Purpose appears in The Jota Anthology.

In her poem "Central Americanamerican" she "diffracts the construction of Central American identity beyond a geographic notion and along the multiple coordinates of migrations, generations, heritages, languages, ethnicities, races, sexualities, cultures, and discourses magnified in the Central American diasporas."

Besides her literary work, Maya Chinchilla directed various video projects including "Solidarity Baby," "The Last Word". Central American Unicorns in Space and is the host of Live and Queer.
