= Chinchillas (lava dome) =

Lava dome complex in the Andes

Coordinates: 22°30′S 66°15′W

Chinchillas is a lava dome complex in the northern Puna of the Andes, in the Sierra de Rinconada. The complex is constructed on an Ordovician basement called the Acoite Formation. In addition to the dacitic lava dome on the southern end of the complex it also contains small volume massive pyroclastic flows and ash-and-block flows. The complex has a volume of 0.26 cubic kilometres (0.062 cu mi). The complex was formed 13±1 mya over a fault zone. Hydrothermal Ag-Pb-Zn deposits found there in breccia were mined occasionally. According to Coira et al. (1996) it, Cerro Redondo and Pan de Azúcar may be part of a caldera system in the Pozuelos Basin.
