= Alfarje =

Type of wooden ceiling

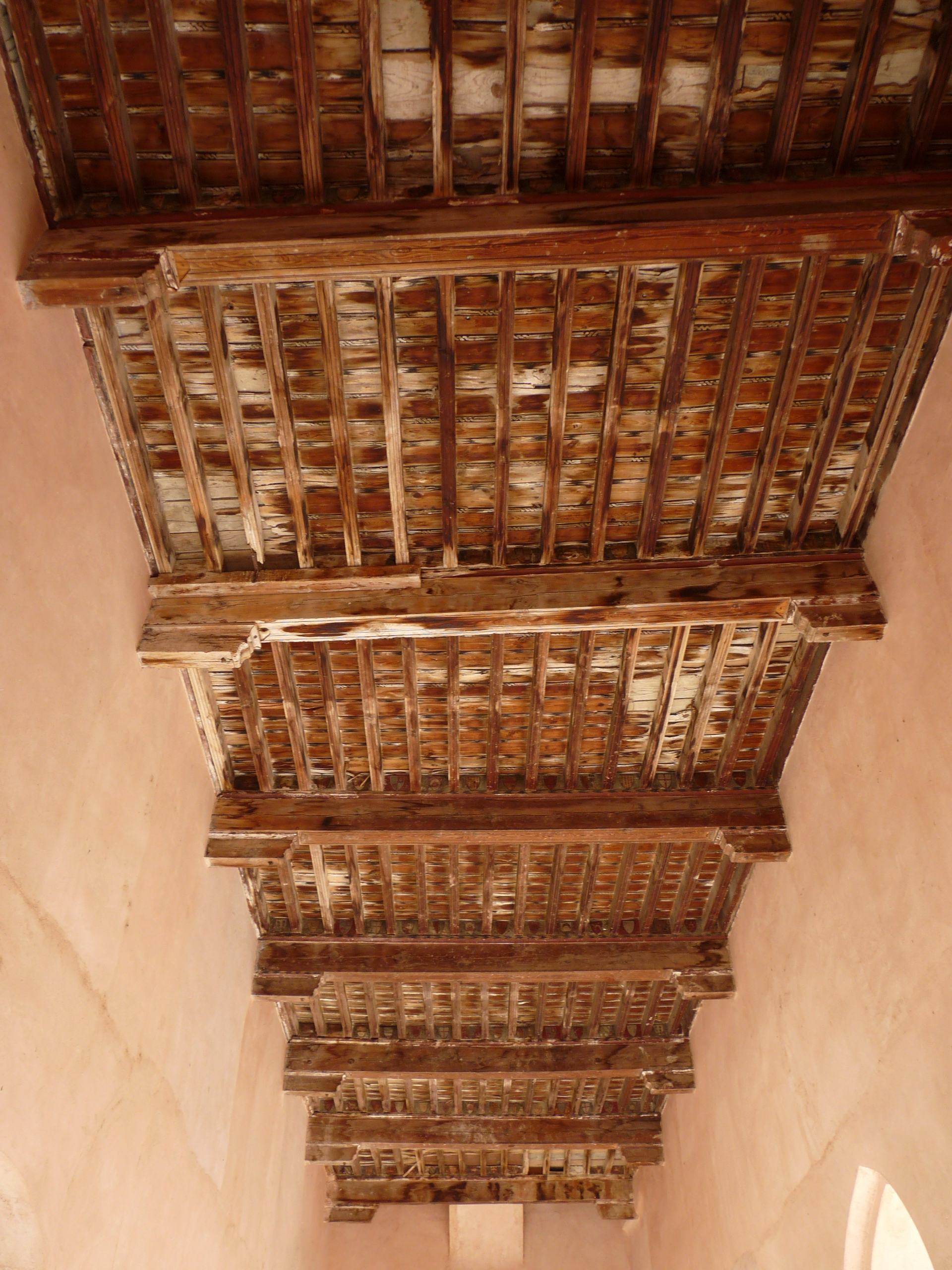
Alfarje ceiling in the Church of Santa María in Maluenda, Spain

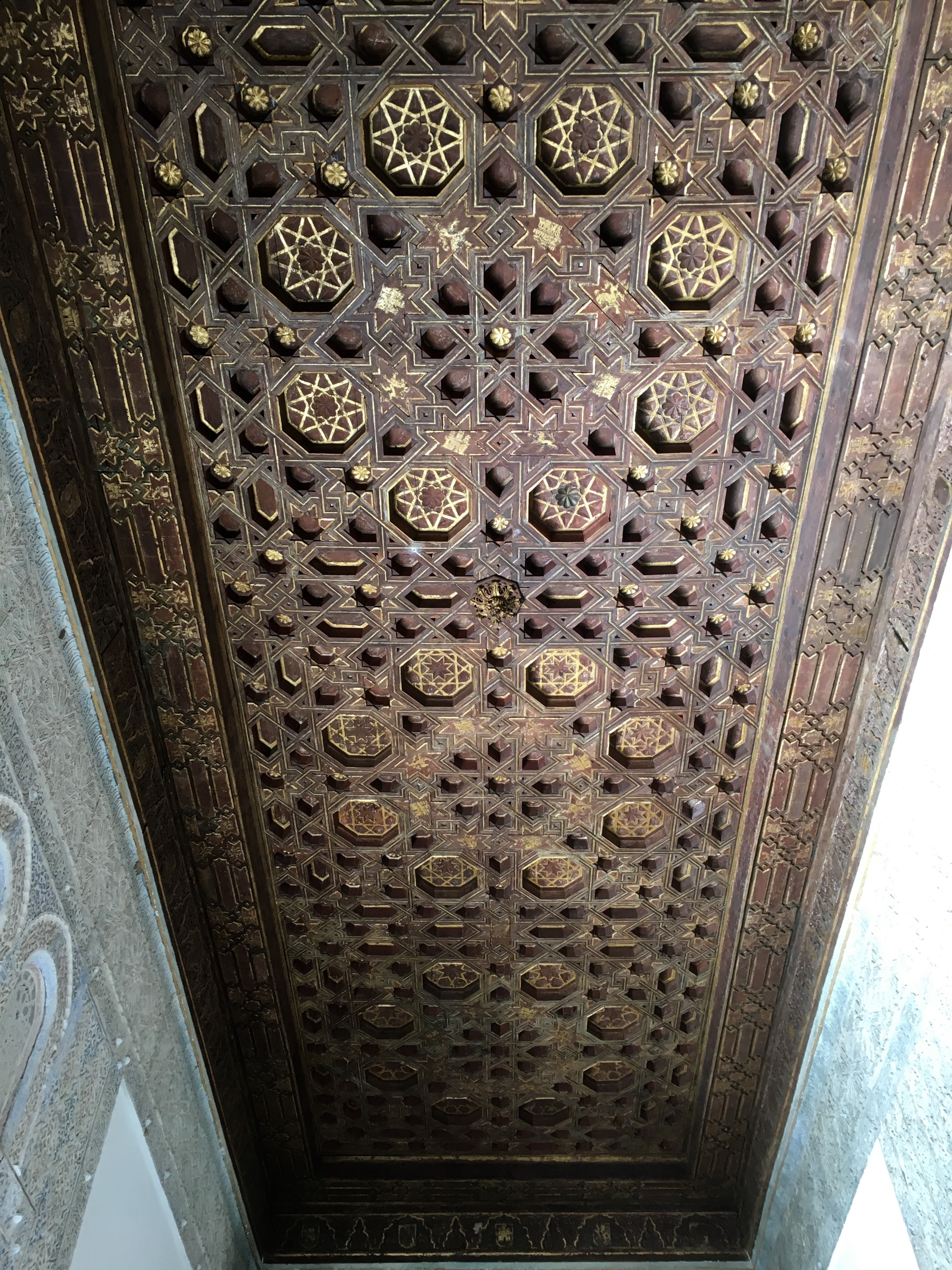
Decorated alfarje ceiling in the Alcázar of Seville in Spain

Alfarje (meaning "paneled ceiling" in Spanish) is a type of horizontal wooden ceiling primarily found in Islamic (or Moorish) architecture and Mudéjar architecture. The word derives from Andalusi Arabic al-farsh, meaning "bed", related to Classical Arabic farsh (فرش), meaning "tapestry". The ceiling structure is made through a series of beams called girders, sometimes intricately carved and stylized with geometric patterns. Typically, such ceilings are employed when they support a floor above that can be walked on.

One decorative technique that creates geometric patterns by nailing and interlacing pieces of wood onto a flat ceiling is known as ataujía in Spanish (adjective form: ataujerado/ataujerada). Examples of such ornamental ceilings are found in the Alhambra of Granada, and the same technique is also found in other types of woodwork from the same period.

Other notable buildings that have alfarje ceilings include the Alcázar of Seville, the Mosque of Cordoba, the Church of San Millán in Segovia, and the Aljafería Palace of Zaragoza. It is also found in the ceilings of many convents and churches in central Mexico, where the influence of Spanish Mudéjar style is apparent.
