= Alfonso Cortés =

Nicaraguan poet (1893-1969)

Alfonso Cortés

Alfonso Cortés (9 December 1893 – 3 February 1969) was a Nicaraguan poet. He is often referred to as the second-most-important Nicaraguan poet, with Rubén Darío, who initiated the Spanish-American literary movement known as modernismo (modernism), being the first. Before his death, he often said he was "less important than Darío, but more profound".

== Early life ==
Cortés was born in the colonial city of León, Nicaragua. At the age of 34, he moved into the house in which the famous and most celebrated Nicaraguan poet, Rubén Darío, spent his childhood. Cortés lost his mind, (due to a lack of clinical studies this is how he is being diagnosed) on midnight of 18 February 1927 at the age of 34. As a result of his delirium, Cortés spent much of that year chained to the iron grillwork of his bedroom because of fear he could possibly hurt himself. A few years of Cortés' life were spent in a mental hospital in Managua. As time passed, Cortés was transferred to his sisters' (Margarita, Maria Luisa and Maria Elsa) house in León, where he eventually spent his last days and died in 1969 at the age of 75.

Cortés had moments of lucidity during which his family would unchain him, and he would use that time to play guitar. The guitar is now owned by a great-nephew and is treasured and preserved. Cortés would write his poetry, often written in the margins of newspapers, in a script so microscopic that they are hard to read without a magnifying glass. Song of Space was the first poem Cortés wrote after he went mad, and it remains one of his most popular.

After his death, he was buried with honours in the Cathedral of León next to the tomb of Rubén Darío.

== Literary works ==
=== Poems ===
- La odisea del Istmo (1922)
- Poesías (1931)
- Tardes de oro (1934)
- Poemas eleusinos (1935)
- Las siete antorchas del sol (1952)
- 30 poemas de Alfonso (1952)
- Las rimas universales (1964)
- Las coplas del pueblo (1965)
- Las pumas del pasatiempo (1967)
- El poema cotidiano (1967)
- Treinta poemas (1968)
- Poemas (1971)
- Antología (1980)
- 30 poemas de Alfonso (1981)
- El tiempo es hambre y el espacio es frío (1981).
