= Carlos Samayoa Chinchilla =

Guatemalan writer

Carlos Samayoa Chinchilla (December 10, 1898–1973) was a Guatemalan writer. For decades he worked in various roles in the government of Guatemala, but is best remembered for his writing, both fiction and non fiction.

He worked as personal secretary for President Jorge Ubico; after Ubico's death he published the memoir El Dictador y Yo ("The Dictator and I"). He afterwards served as director of the Instituto de Antropología e Historia (IDAEH), Guatemala's national institution of anthropology, archaeology, and history, and wrote a number of works on those subjects. In 1957, Falcon's Wing Press in Colorado published a collection of his short stories, "The Emerald Lizard: Tales and Legends of Guatemala."

Samayoa Chinchilla wrote "El arco de Balam-Acab" (The Bow of Balam-Acab), included in a book of stories and legends, Madre Milpa in 1934.

He was married to well-known poet Claudia Lars.
