= Salomón de la Selva =

Nicaraguan writer

- Born: 20 March 1893; León, Nicaragua
- Died: 5 February 1959 (aged 65); Paris, France
- Occupations: poet and honorary

Salomón de la Selva (March 20, 1893 – February 5, 1959) was a Nicaraguan poet and honorary member of the Mexican Academy of Language.

== Biography ==
Salomón de la Selva was born on March 20, 1893, in León, Nicaragua, son of Salomón Selva Glenton and Evangelina Escoto Baca and the oldest of nine children. In 1906 at the age of twelve, he is offered a scholarship by the government of José Santos Zelaya to study in the United States. Salomón de la Selva first took up his secondary studies at the Newton Collegiate Institution in Newton, New Jersey and later at Westerleigh Collegiate Institute in Staten Island, New York, studying in the United States until 1910. To cover costs, de la Selva found himself selling newspapers and shoeshining in Central Park in New York City. After his father's passing on February 2, 1910, Salomón de la Selva returns to Nicaragua and begins studying law at Universidad de León. The history of his pursuits in higher education is unclear, but there are records of de la Selva having taken classes at Cornell University and Columbia University between 1913 and 1915. Around this time he worked for the Spanish-language weekly Las Novedades. He received the title of bachelor in science and letters from the University of Leon in León, Nicaragua. He was later employed at Williams College in Williamstown, Massachusetts, from 1916 to 1917 as a romance language instructor in Spanish and in French.

By winter 1914-15 he met Rubén Darío in New York City and accompanied him to a conference offered at Columbia University on February 4, 1915. In New York, 1918, he published his first book of poetry: Tropical Town and Other Poems which was written in English. He frequented the literary circles of young New York poets with figures such as Stephen Vincent Benét and Edna St. Vincent Millay with whom it was said he had a love affair. From 1917 to 1918, de la Selva served as a soldier in World War I serving the British forces, enlisting in the U.S. army on June 5, 1917. He was able to draw from his experiences on the battlefield to inspire future works, specifically El soldado desconocido (The Unknown Soldier), written in Spanish and illustrated by Diego Rivera, which was published in Mexico in 1922. Around this time in 1922 he was also romantically involved with American author Katherine Anne Porter. He associated himself with the American labour movement and became secretary to labor union leader Samuel Gompers.

Between 1925 and 1929 he lived in Nicaragua and dedicated himself to the local syndicalism activism of laborioust tendency. He urged the affiliation of the Nicaraguan Worker's Federation (Federación Obrera Nicaragüense) to the Panamerican Worker's Central (Central Obrera Panamericana), which was affiliated to the American Federation of Labor. In this time, he married Carmela Castrillo and had two children, Carmelita de la Selva Castrillo (1925–1931) and Salomón de la Selva Castrillo (1927). His daughter Carmelita was born whilst de la Selva served as the director of newspaper Nicaragua Libre of the Nicaraguan Patriotic League and perished in the earthquake which shook Managua on March 31, 1931. By 1930 he had published articles supporting Augusto César Sandino published in San José, Costa Rica through different media such as the Diario de Costa Rica and Repertorio Americano of Joaquín García Monge. and in 1935 he moved to Mexico City, where he was able to influence Mexican politics; along with his brother Rogelio de la Selva, he was advisor to President Miguel Alemán Valdés. In 1933, a son of de la Selva's, Juan, is born in Panama to actress Betty Schroeder. Whilst in France, as a Nicaraguan ambassador for the Government of President Luis Anastasio Somoza, he died on February 5, 1959, in Paris.

== Works ==
=== Poetry ===
- Tropical Town and Other Poems (1918)
- A Song For Wall Street (1918)
- A Soldier Sings (1919)
- El soldado desconocido (1922)
- Evocación de Horacio, Canto a Mérida de Yucatán en la celebración de sus Juegos Florales (1947)
- La ilustre familia (195)
- Canto a la Independencia de México (1955)
- Evocación de Píndaro (1957)
- Acolmixtli Netzahualcóyotl (1958)

=== Novels ===
- La guerra de Sandino o el pueblo desnudo, written in 1935, posthumously published in 1985.
- Narciso, a history of Nicaragua (1930)
