= Debayle =

Debayle is a surname of Nicaraguan origin. Notable people with the surname include:

- Anastasio Somoza Debayle (1925 – 1980), 53rd President of Nicaragua from 1967 to 1972 and from 1974 to 1979, brother of Lillian and Luis
- Hope Portocarrero Debayle (1929 – 1991), First Lady of Nicaragua from 1967 to 1972 and from 1974 to 1979, wife of Anatasio
- Lillian Somoza de Sevilla Sacasa (1921 – 2003), born Lillian Ada de la Cruz Somoza Debayle, sister of Anatasio and Luis
- Luis Pallais Debayle (born 1930), Nicaraguan politician, cousin of Anatasio
- Luis Somoza Debayle (1922 – 1967), 50th President of Nicaragua from 1957 to 1963, brother of Anatasio and Lillian
- Salvadora Debayle (1895 – 1987), First Lady of Nicaragua from 1950 to 1956, mother of Anatasio, Lillian, and Luis
