= Roberto Sacasa =

Nicaraguan politician and president (1840–1896)

Roberto Sacasa Sarria
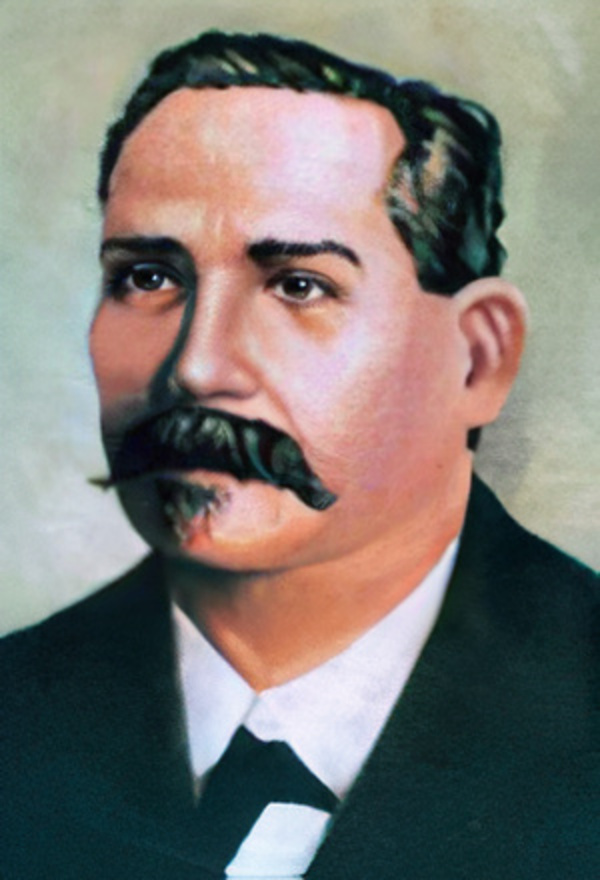

President of Nicaragua
- In office 5 August 1889 – 1 January 1891 (Acting)
- Preceded by: Nicolás Osorno (Acting)
- Succeeded by: Ignacio Chávez
- In office 1 March 1891 – 11 July 1893
- Preceded by: Ignacio Chávez
- Succeeded by: Salvador Machado (Acting)

Personal details
- Born: Roberto Sacasa Sarria; 27 February 1840 El Viejo, Federal Republic of Central America
- Died: 2 June 1896 (aged 56) Managua, Nicaragua
- Party: Conservative
- Spouse: Ángela Sacasa Cuadra
- Relations: Silvestre Selva Sacasa (maternal grand-relative)
- Occupation: Physician

Roberto Sacasa Sarria (27 February 1840 – 2 June 1896) was the President of Nicaragua from 5 August 1889 to 1 January 1891 and again from 1 March 1891 to 11 July 1893.

== Ancestry ==
He was the son of Juan Bautista Sacasa Méndez and Casimira Sarria Montealegre, daughter of Ramón de Sarria y Reyes and Francisca Montealegre Romero (sister to Mariano Montealegre y Romero), themselves the offspring of Mariano Ignacio Montealegre Balmaceda and Casimira Romero Sáenz. Casimira was the daughter of Cecilio Antonio Romero Parajeles and Bárbara Sáenz Bonilla. Barbara, in turn, was the daughter of Manuel Sáenz Vázquez and Ana Antonia Bonilla Astúa, herself the daughter of Juan Bonilla Pereira and Francisca Astúa Cháves de Alfaro. Francisca was the daughter of Juan Astúa and Ana Cháves de Alfaro.

His brother Antioco Sacasa Sarria married Ramona Sacasa Cuadra, sister of Angela Sacasa Cuadra his wife.

He was a maternal relative of Silvestre Selva Sacasa, Supreme Director of Nicaragua appointed by the invading forces of Francisco Malespín during the Malespín's War, and Benjamín Lacayo Sacasa, acting President of Nicaragua during the 1940s.

== Political career ==
Sacasa, a member of the Conservative Party, had many problems due to a split within the conservatives. A rebellion by ex-president Joaquín Zavala in 1893 led to liberal José Santos Zelaya coming to power, ending 35 years of conservative rule.

== Marriage and issue ==
He married his cousin Ángela Sacasa Cuadra and had:

- Juan Bautista Sacasa Sacasa, 18th President of Nicaragua married María Argüello-Manning, a cousin of Leonardo Argüello, 20th President of Nicaragua, and had:
  - Maruca Sacasa-Argüello
  - Carlos Sacasa-Argüello
  - Roberto Sacasa-Argüello, grandfather of US playwright Roberto Aguirre-Sacasa
  - Gloria Sacasa-Argüello
- Dolores Sacasa Sacasa, daughter of his brother, Antioco Sacasa Sacasa married to Ramón Sevilla Castellón, and had:
  - Guillermo Sevilla Sacasa (b. León, Nicaragua)
  - Alberto Sevilla-Sacasa (b. León, Nicaragua)
  - Oscar Sevilla-Sacasa(b. León, Nicaragua)
  - Rafael Sevilla-Sacasa(b. León, Nicaragua)
  - Edda Sevilla-Sacasa (b. León, Nicaragua)
  - Ligia Sevilla-Sacasa(b. León, Nicaragua)
  - Julia Sevilla-Sacasa(b. Managua, Nicaragua) married to James Kudriavtsev (married 1960-divorced in 1970) and have two children. Later she married Henri Alexandre DeBayle-Sacasa and have four children (married 1971):
    - Clelia Kudryavtseva Sevilla-Sacasa de Pereau (b. Washington D.C., United States) (1965–1998), married to Jean-Louis Pereau (1959-1998) both crash victims on board Swissair Flight 111 and had three children:
      - Joelle Pereau (b. Luxembourg City, Luxembourg) (1991–1998), crash victim on board Swissair Flight 111.
      - Sylvie Pereau (b. Geneva, Switzerland) (1993–1998), crash victim on board Swissair Flight 111.
      - Yves Pereau (b. Paris, France) (1995–1998), crash victim on board Swissair Flight 111.
    - George Mikhail Wallace Sevilla-Sacasa, (b. Washington D.C., United States) was married to Leyla Argüello Grons (b. Portuguese East Africa) and now (divorced) they have one child.
      - Ryan Wallace-Sacasa Argüello-Olivas (b. 1993 in Coral Gables, Dade County, Florida)
- Xavier DeBayle-Sevilla (b. Washington D.C., United States
- Robert DeBayle-Sevilla (b. Managua, Nicaragua)
- Nicolas DeBayle-Sevilla (b. Managua, Nicaragua)
- Alexandra DeBayle-Sevilla (b. Washington D.C., United States) (Single)
- Casimira Sacasa Sacasa, married to Dr. Luis Henri Debayle Pallais, son of French Luis Henri Debayle Montgolfier and wife Salvadora Pallais y Bermúdez, and had:
  - Blanca Debayle Sacasa, married to Dr. Nestor Portocarrero Gross, and had:
    - Hope Portocarrero Debayle, married to her first cousin Anastasio Somoza Debayle, 73rd and 76th President of Nicaragua, and had issue
    - Nestor Portocarrero Debayle (b. Tampa, Hillsborough County, Florida)
  - Salvadora Debayle Sacasa, married to Anastasio Somoza García, 65th and 69th President of Nicaragua, and had issue
    - Lillian Somoza Debayle married Guillermo Sevilla Sacasa, and had issue
      - Guillermo Anastasio Sevilla Somoza
      - Lillian Salvadora Sevilla Somoza
      - Luis Ramón Sevilla Somoza
      - Edda Maria Sevilla Somoza
      - Julia Dolores Sevilla Somoza
      - Lorena Isabel Sevilla Somoza
      - Eduardo José Sevilla Somoza
      - Alejandro Xavier Sevilla Somoza
      - Bernardo David Sevilla Somoza
    - Luis Somoza Debayle, married Isabel Urcuyo, and had issue
      - Salvadora Somoza Urcuyo
      - Bernabé Somoza Urcuyo
      - Luis Somoza Urcuyo
      - Álvaro Somoza Urcuyo
      - Gerardo Somoza Urcuyo
    - Anastasio Somoza Debayle, married to his first cousin Hope Portocarrero Debayle, and had issue
      - Anastasio Somoza Portocarrero (b. Miami, Dade County, Florida)
      - Julio Somoza Portocarrero
      - Carolina Somoza Portocarrero
      - Carla Somoza Portocarrero
      - Roberto Somoza Portocarrero

Political offices
Preceded by Position established	Vice President of Nicaragua; 1887–1889	Succeeded by Anastasio Ortiz
Preceded by Nicolás Osorno	President of Nicaragua; 1889–1891	Succeeded by Ignacio Chávez
Preceded by Ignacio Chávez	President of Nicaragua; 1891–1893	Succeeded by Salvador Machado
