= First ladies and gentlemen of Nicaragua =

First Lady and First Gentleman of Nicaragua

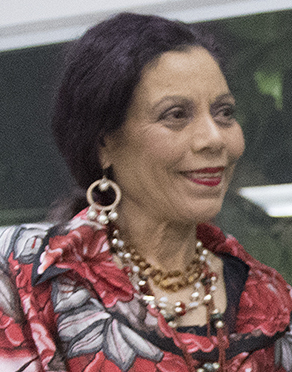
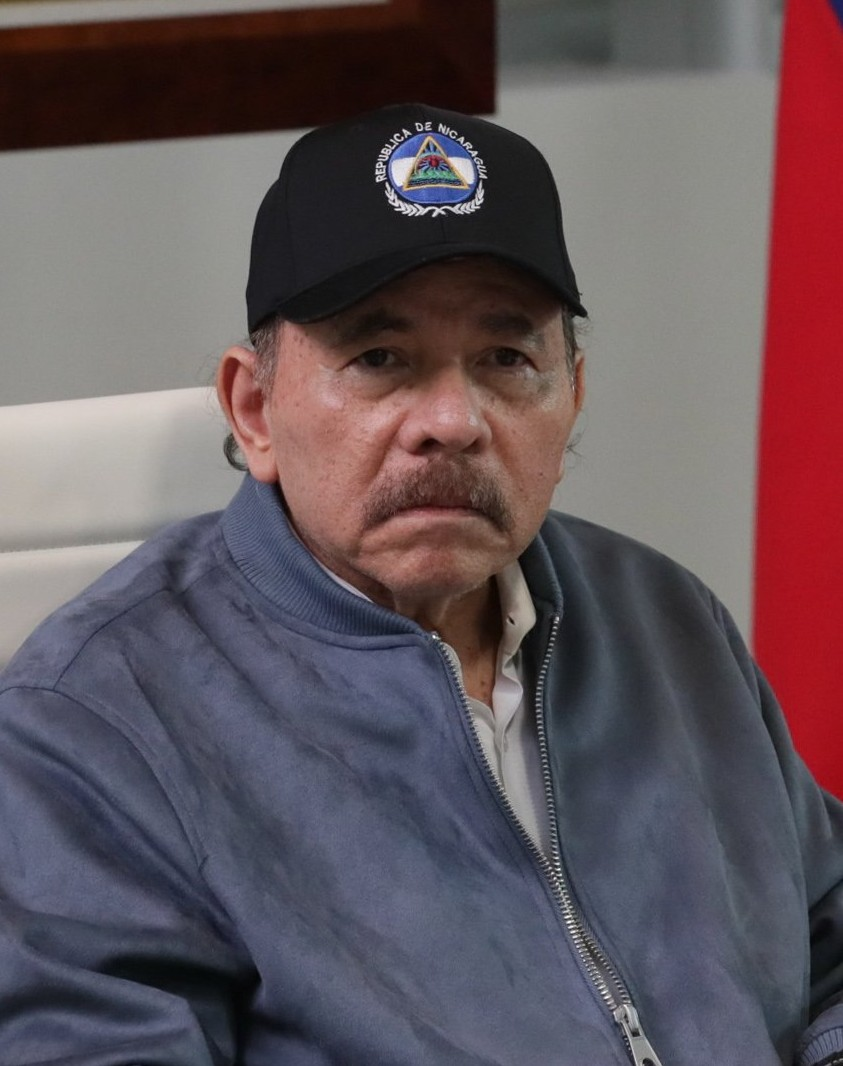
- Incumbent Rosario Murillo Daniel Ortega since 10 January 2007 (Murillo) since 18 February 2025 (Ortega)
- Residence: Casa Naranja
- Inaugural holder: Mercedes Avilés
- Formation: April 30, 1865

The First Lady of Nicaragua (Spanish: Primera dama de Nicaragua) or First Gentleman of Nicaragua (Spanish: Primer caballero de Nicaragua) is the title attributed to the wife or husband of the President of Nicaragua, or their chosen designee, such as a daughter or other female relative. The current first lady is Rosario Murillo, the wife of Co-President Daniel Ortega, and the current first gentleman is Daniel Ortega, husband of Co-President Rosario Murillo. The two share the role of Co-President since January 2025.

== Recent history ==
The daughters of several presidents have assumed the role of first lady or acting first lady in recent decades. From 1990 until 1997, the government of President Violeta Chamorro, Nicaragua's first female president, designated her daughter, Cristiana Chamorro Barrios, in the role of first lady. Violeta Chamorro's husband, Pedro Joaquín Chamorro Cardenal, had been murdered in 1978 before she became president.

Likewise, former President Arnoldo Alemán was a widower and unmarried when he was inaugurated in January 1997. His daughter, María Dolores Alemán Cardinel, served as First Lady of Nicaragua from January 1997 until October 1999 under her father. In October 1999, President Alemán married María Fernanda Flores Lanzas, who then assumed the role of first lady.

The current first lady is Rosario Murillo, the wife of President Daniel Ortega, who has held the position since 2007. Murillo had previously served as first lady during the 1980s as Ortega's domestic partner in a common-law marriage. The couple later officially married in 2005. During the 2016 Nicaraguan general election, President Ortega controversially selected his wife as his running mate for Vice President of Nicaragua, the second highest political position in Nicaragua. Murillo became Vice President in January 2017, simultaneously serving as first lady. She is "widely seen as the power behind the presidency" according to Lucia Newman, a journalist with Al Jazeera English and a veteran journalist on Latin America. In 2021, Ortega, who was seeking a fourth consecutive term, and Murillo were re-elected during an election marred by the arrest and detention of numerous political opponents of the Ortega government, including Cristiana Chamorro Barrios, the first lady from 1990 to 1997, and María Fernanda Flores Lanzas, the former first lady from 1999 to 2002. Murillo was sanctioned by the European Union for human rights violations and undermining Nicaraguan democracy during the election, while the Biden administration banned Murillo and other officials from entering the United States.

== Partial list of first ladies and gentlemen of Nicaragua ==
Portrait	Name	Term began	Term ended	President of Nicaragua	Notes
	Salvadora Debayle	January 1, 1937	May 1, 1947	Anastasio Somoza García	First tenure as first lady during the Somoza dictatorship.
	Salvadora Debayle	May 21, 1950	September 29, 1956	Anastasio Somoza García	Second tenure as first lady during the Somoza dictatorship. Anastasio Somoza García was assassinated on September 29, 1956.
	Isabel Urcuyo	September 29, 1956	May 1, 1963	Luis Somoza Debayle	Urcuyo was a Costa Rican-born diplomat.
	Carmen Reñazco	May 1, 1963	August 3, 1966	René Schick	Reñazco had married Schick on March 16, 1937. President Schick died in office in August 1966.
	?	August 3, 1966	August 4, 1966	Orlando Montenegro Medrano	
	Sara Mora de Guerrero	August 4, 1966	May 1, 1967	Lorenzo Guerrero	
	Hope Portocarrero	May 1, 1967	May 1, 1972	Anastasio Somoza Debayle	Portocarrero, an American, was born in Tampa, Florida, and married Somoza in 1950. First tenure as first lady during the Somoza dictatorship.
	Vacant	May 1, 1972	December 1, 1974	Liberal-Conservative Junta	Liberal-Conservative Junta, though power rested with Anastasio Somoza Debayle's dictatorship.
	Hope Portocarrero	December 1, 1974	July 17, 1979	Anastasio Somoza Debayle	Second tenure as first lady during the Somoza dictatorship. Portocarrero separated from Somoza during this time, but they never divorced. President Anastasio Somoza was overthrown in 1979 during the Nicaraguan Revolution. Portocarrero remarried after her husband's assassination and died in 1991 as Hope Somoza Baldocchi.
	Maria Luisa Muñoz	July 17, 1979	July 18, 1979	Francisco Urcuyo	Acting president
	Position vacant	July 18, 1979	January 10, 1985	Junta of National Reconstruction	Junta of National Reconstruction led by Daniel Ortega.
	Rosario Murillo	January 10, 1985	April 25, 1990	Daniel Ortega	Murillo and Ortega had a common-law marriage, but were not officially married at the time. She became first lady upon Ortega's inauguration. A poet, Murillo was also the director of the Institute of Culture during this time. Ortega and Murillo later formally married in 2005.
	Cristiana Chamorro Barrios	April 25, 1990	January 10, 1997	Violeta Chamorro	Violeta Chamorro, Nicaragua's first female president, was a widow. Her daughter, Cristiana Chamorro Barrios, served in the role of first lady during her presidency.
	María Dolores Alemán Cardinel	January 10, 1997	October 23, 1999	Arnoldo Alemán	President Alemán was a widower and unmarried from 1997 until 1999. His daughter, María Dolores Alemán Cardinel, served as first lady until his marriage in October 1999.
	María Fernanda Flores Lanzas	October 23, 1999	January 10, 2002	Arnoldo Alemán	María Fernanda Flores Lanzas married President Alemán on October 23, 1999 and assumed the role of first lady.
	Lila T. Abaunza	January 10, 2002	January 10, 2007	Enrique Bolaños	
	Rosario Murillo	January 10, 2007	Present	Daniel Ortega	First Lady since 2007, Murillo is a highly influential figure in Nicaraguan politics. In 2016, Daniel Ortega selected his wife as his running mate for Vice President of Nicaragua in a controversial move. She has simultaneously held the Vice Presidency since January 2017.
	Daniel Ortega	February 18, 2025	Present	Rosario Murillo	Ortega assumed the role of First Gentleman in January 2025 when his wife, Rosario Murillo, assumed the role of Co-President. They are currently serving simultaneously as Co-Presidents as well as each other's first spouse.
