= Anastasio Somoza =

Anastasio Somoza may refer to:

- Anastasio Somoza García (1896–1956), Nicaraguan dictator 1936–1956
- Anastasio Somoza Debayle (1925–1980), Nicaraguan dictator 1967–1979
- Anastasio Somoza Portocarrero (born 1951), son of Somoza Debayle
