= Urcuyo =

Urcuyo is a surname. Notable people with the surname include:

- Alfredo Gómez Urcuyo (born 1942), Nicaraguan politician
- Francisco Urcuyo (1915–2001), Nicaraguan politician
- Isabel Urcuyo (1924–2014), Costa Rican-born diplomat
