= Somoza family =

Ruling family of Nicaragua from 1936 to 1979

Somoza family Familia Somoza
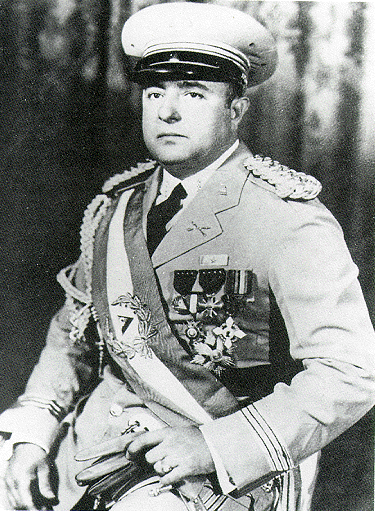
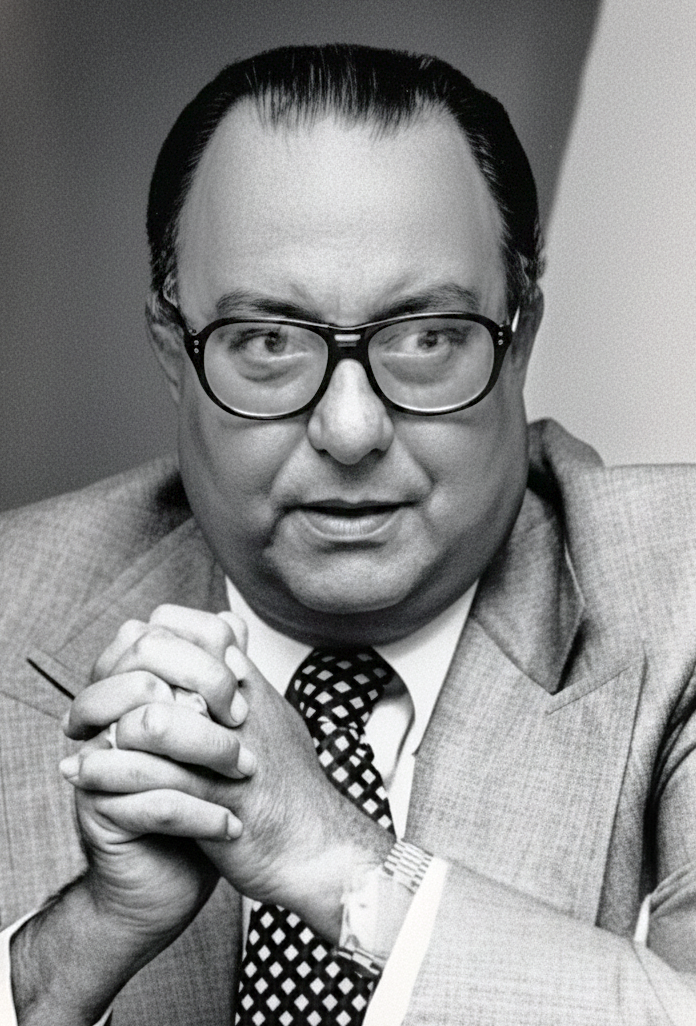
- Anastasio Somoza García, founder and first ruler of the dictatorship Anastasio Somoza Debayle, youngest son and third and last ruler of the dictatorship
- Country: Nicaragua
- Founded: 1 January 1936
- Founder: Anastasio Somoza García
- Final ruler: Anastasio Somoza Debayle
- Titles: President of Nicaragua; Head of the National Guard
- Members: Anastasio Somoza García; Luis Somoza Debayle; Anastasio Somoza Debayle
- Connected members: Wife of Anastasio Somoza García: Salvadora Debayle Sacasa; Daughter of Anastasio Somoza García: Lillian Somoza de Sevilla Sacasa; Wife of Luis Somoza Debayle: Isabel Urcuyo; Wife of Anastasio Somoza Debayle: Hope Portocarrero; Son of Anastasio Somoza Debayle: Anastasio Somoza Portocarrero
- Deposition: 17 July 1979

The Somoza family (Spanish: Familia Somoza) is a political family which ruled Nicaragua under a dictatorship over a period of 43 years, from 1936 to 1979. Founded by Anastasio Somoza García — who served as the President of Nicaragua for two terms between 1937–1947 and 1950–1956 — was succeeded by his two sons; the eldest, Luis Somoza Debayle from 1956 to 1963, and youngest, Anastasio Somoza Debayle, serving for two presidential terms between 1967–1972 and 1974–1979. Although the Somozas did not hold the presidency for the full 43 years, their political influence was continuously exacted via the installation of puppet presidents and ongoing control of the National Guard.

While the Somoza family moved towards modernizing Nicaragua, their rule featured repression and inequality. Over four decades, the Somoza family accumulated wealth through corporate bribes, land-grabbing and foreign-aid siphoning. The family received support from the government of the United States, and the leadership styles of each Somoza president was different from one another.

Ultimately, the Somoza family was overthrown by the socialist Sandinista National Liberation Front (FSLN) during the Nicaraguan Revolution of 1961–1990. Widespread discontent with the Somoza regime emerged following the Managua earthquake of 1972. Anastasio Somoza Debayle declared himself the Head of the National Emergency Committee and used his power to participate in looting and in the mismanagement of international-aid funding. Discomfort increased in the light of the rise of the Sandinista National Liberation Front and in response to the Somoza government's human-rights violations. Various opposition groups emerged, and two key approaches to overthrow the dictatorship became clear. While the Broad Opposition Front (Spanish: Frente Amplio Opositor, FAO) attempted to reach a solution via negotiation, the FSLN pushed insurrection. When negotiations failed, the insurrection movement, with military support from the Soviet Union through Cuba, launched a successful offensive into the cities, with human rights violations committed by the National Guard resulting in the Somoza government's international, political and military isolation. On 17 July 1979, Anastasio Somoza Debayle resigned as President of Nicaragua, marking the end of the Somoza-family dictatorship.

The family accumulated wealth through corporate bribes, industrial monopolies, land grabbing, and foreign aid siphoning. By the 1970s, the family owned around 23% of the land in Nicaragua. The Somoza's wealth is speculated to have reached approximately $533 million, which amounted to half of Nicaragua's debt and 33% of the country's 1979 GDP.

== Members ==
Three of the Somoza family members served as President of Nicaragua. They were:

- Anastasio Somoza García "Tacho" (1896–1956; President 1937–1947, 1950–1956), the father.
- Luis Somoza Debayle (1922–1967, President 1956–1963), his eldest legitimate son.
- Anastasio Somoza Debayle "Tachito" (1925–1980, President 1967–1972, 1974–1979), his second legitimate son.

Other members of the Somoza family include:

- José R. Somoza, the half-brother of Anastasio Somoza Debayle
- Hope Portocarrero, the wife of Anastasio Somoza Debayle
- Lillian Somoza de Sevilla Sacasa, the daughter of Anastasio Somoza García
- Isabel Urcuyo (1924–2014), the wife of Luis Somoza Debayle
- Anastasio Somoza Portocarrero, a son of Anastasio Somoza Debayle and his wife
- Luis Pallais Debayle, cousin of Anastasio Somoza Debayle
- Carolina Somoza Portocarrero, a daughter of Anastasio Somoza Debayle and his wife, who is married to James Minskoff Sterling, son of New York real estate developer Henry H. Minskoff
- Martha Debayle, a niece of Anastasio Somoza Debayle, Nicaraguan Mexican radio hostess and entrepreneur
- Anastasia Somoza, American disability rights advocate and granddaughter of Luis Somoza Debayle

== Anastasio Somoza García ==
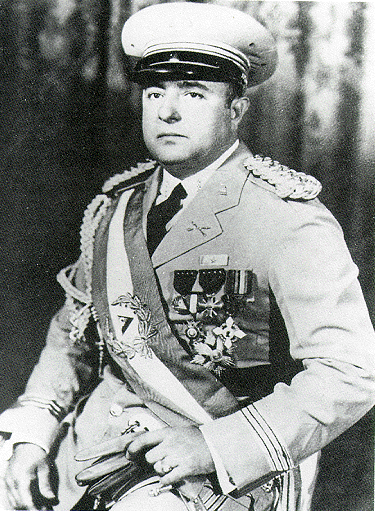
Anastasio Somoza García in 1936

Anastasio Somoza García (1 February 1896 – 29 September 1956) was the founder of the Somoza dictatorship. He was born into a wealthy coffee planter family as the son of senator Anastasio Somoza Reyes and Julia García. He was educated at the Instituto Nacional de Oriente and the Pierce School of Business Administration in Philadelphia. During his time in the United States, he learned the English language and met his wife Salvadora Debayle Sacasa, the daughter of a wealthy and politically connected family.

After returning to Nicaragua, Anastasio Somoza García joined the Liberal revolt in 1926. He worked as an interpreter during peace talks between the United States and the Nicaraguan factions, improving his reputation among United States officials. When José María Moncada assumed the presidency in 1929, Somoza served as the governor of León, the Consul to Costa Rica, the Minister of Foreign Affairs, and Moncada's personal aide. When the United States Marines organized the Nicaraguan National Guard, Somoza became an officer and later an assistant to the Commander. Following the departure of the U.S. Marines in 1933, Somoza became the Head of the National Guard.

In 1936, Anastasio Somoza García executed a military coup. Leveraging his control of the National Guard, he overthrew President Juan Bautista Sacasa and replaced him with his own candidate for Acting President, Carlos Brenes Jarquín. Somoza was nominated for the presidency a week later at a Liberal Party convention on 16 June 1936 and was inaugurated into office on 1 January 1937.

Anastasio Somoza García was the President of Nicaragua for the next nineteen years. He occupied the presidency directly for most of this period, only occasionally ruling through puppets. To maintain support from the National Guard, he put family members and close friends in positions of power. He fostered the support of the United States, with his regime backing U.S. foreign policy. He pursued economic developmentalism and sought to modernize Nicaragua. Somoza's policies focused on growing exports, as well as creating economic infrastructure and public agencies. These policies did little for the common citizen, but benefited Somoza's fortune significantly.

Anastasio Somoza García was assassinated in 1956. He was shot by poet Rigoberto López Pérez and died several days later on 29 September 1956.

== Luis Somoza Debayle ==
Luis Somoza Debayle (18 November 1922 – 13 April 1967) was the eldest son of Anastasio Somoza García. He was born in León, Nicaragua and received an American education at Saint Leo College Prep School, La Salle Military Academy and Louisiana State University. He became a captain in the National Guard by the age of eighteen and entered Congress by 1950. By 1956 he became the President of Congress, constitutionally empowering him to fill the Presidency in the instance of an unexpected vacancy. Upon his father's assassination in 1956, Luis Somoza Debayle became the Acting President of Nicaragua. He was formally elected to the presidency through fraudulent elections in 1957, making him the 26th President of Nicaragua.

Luis Somoza Debayle's presidential term made attempts at modernisation and political liberalisation. In 1959, he restored the constitutional ban on immediate re-election and presidential succession by relatives. This prevented his younger brother, Anastasio Somoza Debayle, from running in the 1963 presidential election. In 1960, Nicaragua established the Central American Common Market alongside El Salvador, Guatemala and Honduras. This improved Nicaragua's Central American relations and led to rapid growth of the Nicaraguan economy. Luis maintained his father's favourability to the United States. Luis' government condemned the Cuban Revolution and played a leading role in the failed Bay of Pigs Invasion in 1961. He put in place numerous socio-economic reforms in public housing, education, social security and agrarian reform, closely coinciding with the United States’ Alliance for Progress initiative. While these policies created jobs, they further enriched the privileged and had limited benefit for impoverished Nicaraguans.

Luis Somoza Debayle's presidential term ended in 1963. Between 1963 and 1967, he ruled through puppet presidents. René Schick won the 1963 presidential election and ruled until his death in 1966. He was succeeded by Lorenzo Guerrero. Luis Somoza Debayle died of a heart attack in 1967.

== Anastasio Somoza Debayle ==
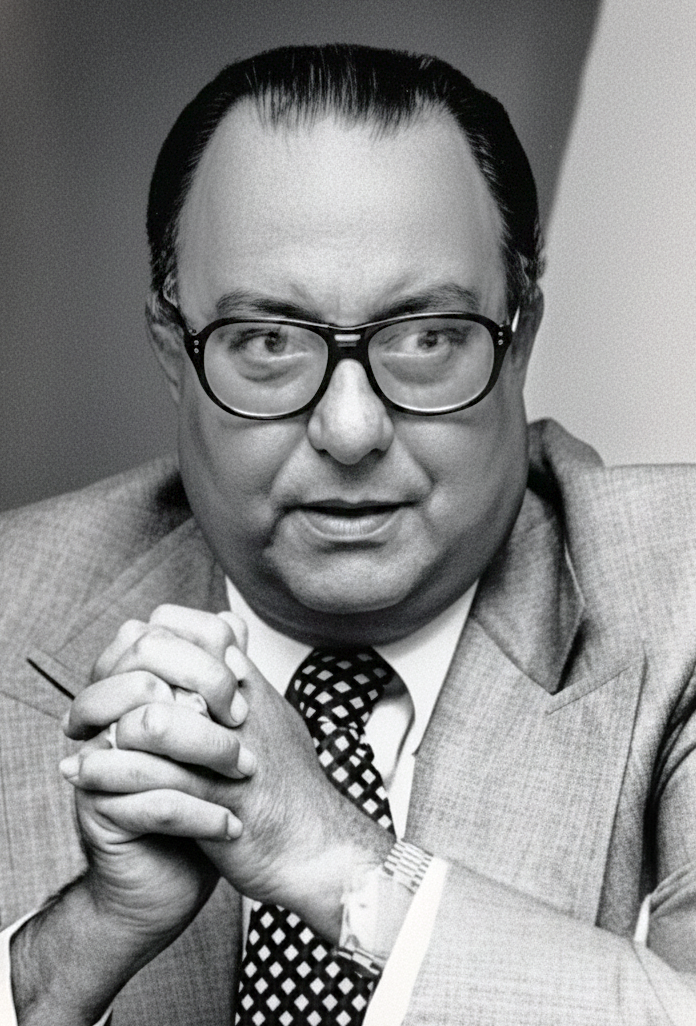
Anastasio Somoza Debayle in 1975

Anastasio Somoza Debayle (5 December 1925 – 17 September 1980) was the youngest son of Anastasio Somoza García. He received an American education at West Point and was the Head of the National Guard from 1955.

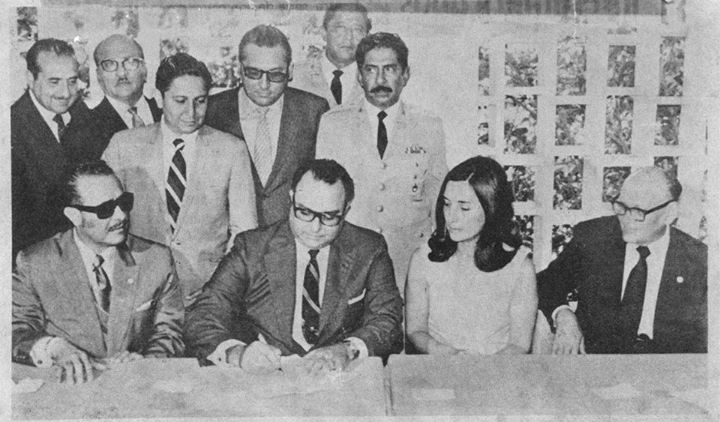
Anastasio Somoza Debayle and his wife Hope Portocarrero at the abrogation of the Bryan-Chamorro Treaty in 1970

Anastasio Somoza Debayle's first presidential term was from 1967 to 1972. His leadership differed from his older brother's and marked a return to his father's harsher style of personalist dictatorship. He relied on military power and exercised no restraint in using public office for personal enrichment. He encouraged corruption and protected his officers from prosecution. He developed a reputation as a human rights violator and replaced his brother's skilled administrators with unqualified political allies. By the 1970s, the government was becoming corrupt and inefficient.

While his first term was meant to expire in 1971, Anastasio Somoza Debayle amended the re-election ban in the constitution, allowing him to serve as president for an additional year. Somoza ruled through puppets in the period between his first and second presidential terms. He organised a pact with Fernando Agüero, the leader of the Conservative party, whereby he would transfer power to a triumvirate. Under the arrangement, the triumvirate would rule temporarily while an election was held, and a new constitution was written. When the transfer took place in 1972, Somoza returned to his role as the Head of the National Guard. He was later re-elected as president in 1974.

The downfall of the Somoza dictatorship coincided with Anastasio Somoza Debayle's second presidential term. He resigned as president in July 1979 and was assassinated in September 1980.

== Downfall ==
=== Managua earthquake, 1972 ===
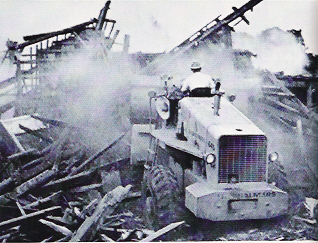
Cleaning up damage caused by the 1972 Managua earthquake

On 23 December 1972, an earthquake devastated the Nicaraguan capital city of Managua. The earthquake killed 10,000 people, left many homeless and caused widespread infrastructural damage. Although he was not president at the time, Anastasio Somoza Debayle quickly established the National Emergency Committee of which he was the head. This put him in the position to allocate relief funds, which he did in a corrupt and self-serving manner. International aid enriched the Somoza family instead of reaching victims. Emergency housing funds received from the United States Agency for International Development went disproportionately into the construction of luxury housing for National Guard officers, with the homeless provided hastily constructed wooden shacks. Furthermore, as Head of the National Guard, Somoza allowed the National Guard to participate in the looting of the remaining business establishments, purchasing land and industries that would figure lucratively in the reconstruction. The promised reconstruction of the city never took place with reconstruction of roads, drainage systems and public transportation grossly mishandled.

It was at this point that open expressions of discontent with the Somoza regime began to surface. In particular, the Somoza government began to lose the support from Nicaragua's economic elite. As a result, the business community began financially supporting the FSLN, an opposition group.

=== Rise of the FSLN ===
Flag of the Sandinista National Liberation Front (FSLN)

In 1961, the Sandinista National Liberation Front (FSLN) was formally organised. The FSLN began as a group of Marxist, antigovernment student activists at the National Autonomous University of Nicaragua in the late 1950s. By the early 1970s, the group had gained enough support to launch limited military initiatives.

On 27 December 1974, a group of FSLN guerrillas seized the home of former government official, José Maria Castillo, and held a group of leading Nicaraguan officials hostage, many of whom were Somoza relatives. The FSLN made their demands known and an agreement was made between the Somoza government and the guerrillas on 30 December 1974. As a result, the guerrillas received a US$1 million ransom and had a FSLN declaration read over the radio and printed in La Prensa. Furthermore, the guerrillas negotiated the release and transportation of fourteen FSLN prisoners to Cuba along with themselves. The success of the operation saw the FSLN's prestige soar and damaged perceptions of the Somoza regime.

=== Human rights violations ===
Anastasio Somoza Debayle responded to the increasing opposition brought about by the FSLN by imposing a state of siege and censoring the press. During this time, the National Guard engaged in widespread torture, rape, arbitrary imprisonment and execution of opponents and peasants. These human rights violations led to national and international condemnation of the Somoza regime and built support for the FSLN.

In 1977, the Jimmy Carter administration made United States military assistance conditional on improvements to human rights. This, accompanied by condemnation, led Somoza to lift the state of siege and reinstated freedom of the press in September 1977. While his predecessors had condoned or at least ignored Somoza's brutality, Carter told the dictator that he must relax political controls and allow a transition to democracy. With the intention of staving off a possible "second Cuba," the Carter administration pushed for reform in Managua. Carter had hoped to restrain Somoza by encouraging reform and democracy. However, the US Government found this policy difficult to implement. With little support from Washington, the Sandinistas made progress in their overthrow of the Somoza family. In the end, the Sandinistas quickly established themselves as the real winners of the Nicaraguan Revolution, despite the desperate maneuverings of the Carter administration. A new provisional government quickly yielded power to the Government of National Reconstruction (JGRN) composed of many anti-Somoza members.

=== Growing opposition ===
Reinstated freedoms allowed newspapers to cover opposition activities and the rights violations of the Somoza government. This led to rising discomfort with the Somoza government and strengthened support of the opposition.

The FSLN attacked National Guard outposts across the country and gained support from Los Doce, an opposition group composed of Nicaragua's elite calling for the inclusion of the FSLN in any post-Somoza government.

On 10 January 1978, Pedro Joaquín Chamorro, the owner of La Prensa and founder of the Democratic Liberation Union opposition group, was assassinated. Somoza's son and the National Guard were held responsible, provoking mass demonstrations against the Somoza government.

=== Two approaches to a solution ===
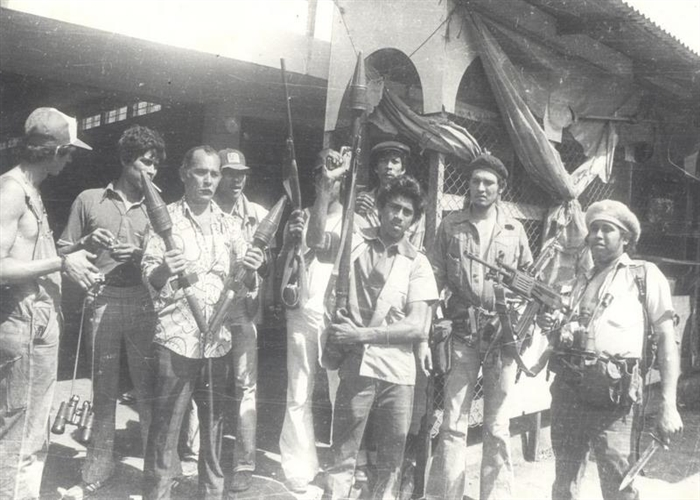
FSLN troops during the insurrection of León July 1979

During the Somoza regime, numerous opposition groups emerged in addition to the FSLN. In May 1978, the Conservative Party joined the Democratic Liberation Union, Los Doce and the Nicaraguan Democratic Movement in creating the Broad Opposition Front (FAO). FAO aimed to achieve a negotiated solution with the Somoza government, operating through strikes and mediation. The FSLN responded to FAO by establishing the United People's Movement. The United People's Movement had a different approach to reaching a solution, promoting warfare and nationwide insurrection as the means to overthrow the dictatorship.

In August 1978, the FSLN took over the National Palace, holding government officials and members of congress hostage. Somoza had no choice but to meet their demands, further tarnishing the Somoza image and undermining the regime's power.

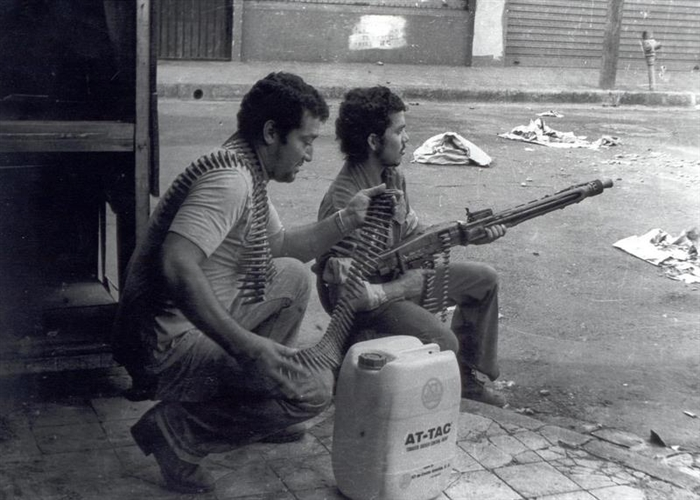
FSLN troops during the insurrection of León July 1979

By late 1978, FAO's failure to obtain a negotiated solution led to the increasing strength of the insurrection movement. Los Doce withdrew from FAO in October and many FAO members resigned. The mediation effort officially collapsed in January 1979, when Somoza refused to hold a national plebiscite and insisted on remaining in power until 1981. As a result, the insurrection movement gained momentum and fighting increased.

In February 1979, the FSLN seized the opportunity afforded by the collapse of negotiations to broaden its support base and form the National Patriotic Front which included Los Doce, the Independent Liberal Party and Popular Social Christian Party. Heavy fighting broke out all over Nicaragua and the FSLN's final offensive was launched in May 1979. These efforts saw the National Guard lose control over many areas of the country. By the end of June, most of Nicaragua was under FSLN control.

The Somoza regime's political, international and military isolation forced Anastasio Somoza Debayle to consider resignation. A provisional Nicaraguan government in exile was organised in Costa Rica on 18 June 1979. The five-member junta promised a mixed economy, a nonaligned foreign policy and political pluralism.

=== Resignation ===
On 17 July 1979, Anastasio Somoza Debayle resigned as President of Nicaragua and fled to Miami, marking the end of the Somoza family dictatorship. Senate President Pablo Rener fled with him. Somoza handed over power to President of the Chamber of Deputies Francisco Urcuyo who would in turn transfer the government to the junta. Anastasio Somoza Debayle lived in Paraguay until 17 September 1980 when he was assassinated by Argentine guerrillas.

== Timeline ==
Anastasio Somoza García
Luis Somoza Debayle
Anastasio Somoza Debayle
│
1936
│
1937
│
1938
│
1939
│
1940
│
1941
│
1942
│
1943
│
1944
│
1945
│
1946
│
1947
│
1948
│
1949
│
1950
│
1951
│
1952
│
1953
│
1954
│
1955
│
1956
│
1957
│
1958
│
1959
│
1960
│
1961
│
1962
│
1963
│
1964
│
1965
│
1966
│
1967
│
1968
│
1969
│
1970
│
1971
│
1972
│
1973
│
1974
│
1975
│
1976
│
1977
│
1978
│
1979

== See also ==
- List of political families
- Military dictatorship in El Salvador
