= Salvadora Debayle =

Nicaraguan First Lady and socialite

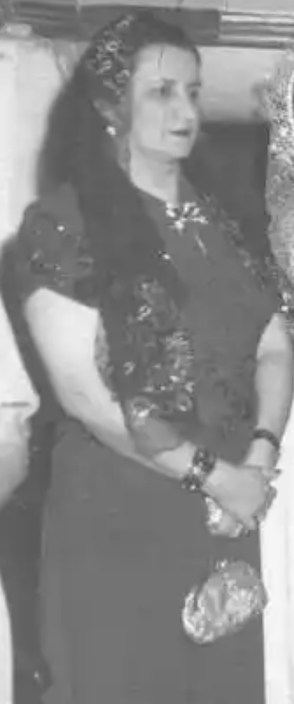

First Lady of Nicaragua
- In office 21 May 1950 – 29 September 1956
- President: Anastasio Somoza Garcia
- Preceded by: Sara Mora de Guerrero
- Succeeded by: Isabel Urcuyo

Personal details
- Born: Ana Salvadora Debayle Sacasa Somoza García; 27 May 1895 León, Nicaragua
- Died: 1 February 1987 (aged 91) Washington D.C., U.S.
- Spouse: Anastasio Somoza Garcia (m. 1919; died 1956)
- Children: Lillian Somoza Debayle, Luis Somoza Debayle, Anastasio Somoza Debayle

Ana Salvadora Debayle Sacasa de Somoza García (27 May 1895 – 1 February 1987) was the First Lady of Nicaragua during the presidency of her husband, the dictator Anastasio Somoza Garcia.

She was the mother of Lillian Somoza Debayle, Luis Somoza Debayle and Anastasio Somoza Debayle. She was popularly known as Doña Salvadorita and among her relatives Mama Yoya.

== Early life and education ==
Ana Salvadora Debayle Sacasa was born in Leon, Nicaragua as a daughter of Dr. Louis Henri Debayle Pallais, who was of French and Spanish descent, and Casimira Sacasa Sacasa, a daughter of President Roberto Sacasa Sarria and a niece of President Juan Bautista Sacasa. Salvadora had four brothers and three sisters. By her maternal line, she came from one of the most distinguished and important families in the country, and she also had ties with most of the other Criollo families in Nicaragua.

In 1913, Salvadora was studying in Belgium with her sister Margarita; a year later, upon the outbreak of the World War I, they were transferred to London, in the United Kingdom, and later to Philadelphia, Pennsylvania, in the United States, where they studied at Beechwood School in Jenkintown, Pennsylvania. Recently arrived from Europe, Salvadora had an attack of appendicitis. During a visit by her brother Luis Manuel Debayle to the hospital, he arrived accompanied by his friend Anastasio Somoza García, nicknamed "Sony" by his US American friends, who would later become the founder of the Somoza dynasty in Nicaragua.

== Personal life ==
Debayle and Somoza married in a civil ceremony in Philadelphia, in 1919, without the consent of the bride's parents, who did not look favorably on the middle-class young Somoza as husband to their aristocratic daughter; Dr. Debayle and Mrs. Casimira are said to have reluctantly accepted the marriage. The subsequent religious ceremony took place in the cathedral of León, Nicaragua, with great luxury. Salvadora's father-in-law, Senator Anastasio Somoza Reyes, presented her with a diamond necklace, in addition to giving the couple $500 at the time. "Salvadorita" and Anastasio went abroad on their honeymoon for almost a year.

They had three children: Lillian, Luis Anastasio and Anastasio Somoza Debayle.

== First Lady of Nicaragua ==
In 1937, Salvadora became First Lady of Nicaragua, the first in office in this country to become a popularly known figure. Her social and personal life was covered extensively in media, both at home and abroad. Among her acts of philanthropy was an event held on Christmas 1938, where she distributed 25,000 gifts to children of limited resources in Managua, the capital of Nicaragua, and attended matters related to the Women's Wing of the Nationalist Liberal Party (PLN). She shared joys and sorrows with her husband, who was also the president of that party. Of a strong and admirable character, she exerted a great influence on the Somoza government and many of the Nicaraguan Somozas remember her with appreciation.

As first lady, she devoted herself more to social events and philanthropy; however, Salvadora exercised great power not visible, an example of this occurred in the early 40s, when she complained to her husband that her name had been omitted in the social chronicle of the newspaper La Prensa from a list of ladies attending a party. This provoked the fury of Anastasio Somoza, who in revenge closed La Prensa for three days.

She was present at the dance at the Casa del Obrero in León when the young poet Rigoberto López Pérez, a militant of the opposition Independent Liberal Party (PLI), shot her husband on the night of September 21, 1956, and accompanied him in his last moments at the Gorgas Hospital, located in the Panama Canal Zone, where he died in the early morning of September 29. Pope Pius XII sent his blessing to Salvadora. New York Cardinal Francis Spellman sent a statement to Luis Somoza Debayle, the president's eldest son, who succeeded him, writing that, "I am sure your father would have been very pleased to know that you will be his successor." U.S. President Dwight D. Eisenhower also expressed his great sympathy for the deceased and condolences to his family. Rafael Leónidas Trujillo, dictator of the Dominican Republic, was one of those who most presented solidarity for Somoza, alongside Paul Magloire of Haiti, Fulgencio Batista of Cuba, Carlos Ibáñez del Campo of Chile, and Alfredo Stroessner of Paraguay. Among other messages that arrived in Nicaragua was a condolence from the British queen Elizabeth II.

== Later life ==
After the death of Salvadora's husband, her son Luis assumed the presidency of the country. At the time when Anastasio Somoza García had been shot and was wounded, Salvadora was the one who ordered from León, Nicaragua, that the National Congress of Nicaragua meet, and that Luis be sworn in as President of the Republic.

When her husband died, Salvadora inherited a large fortune, which elevated her amongst the richest families in Latin America. It was said that she possessed a magnificent collection of jewelry. The Somoza family owned numerous luxury properties inside and outside Nicaragua.

Her life as a widow was spent in the social circles of her native Nicaragua and in the United States, where she lived next to her firstborn Lillian Somoza de Seville-Sacasa. On different occasion, her daughters-in-law granted her a preferential position to theirs as first ladies. Even during the rule of her son "Tachito", Salvadora entered the receptions and galas with her daughter-in-law Hope.

In the spring of 1983, Salvadora Debayle de Somoza set the fate of her fortune. Her will began by saying: "Being in full use of my mental faculties, being free from harshness, threats or undue influence of any person, I make public and declare this my last will and testament [...]". She named universal heir of all her fortune and transferred all her real, personal or mixed properties to her daughter Lillian Somoza Debayle of Seville Sacasa, because she had given her "roof and has taken care of me for more than fifteen years". This was immediately disputed by the family of her eldest son Luis Somoza Debayle.

The family of Doña Salvadora was key to the consolidation of the Somoza dynasty. During her husband's rule, several of her relatives held strategic positions in politics:

- Guillermo Sevilla Sacasa, her son-in-law and cousin: Ambassador in Washington, D.C.
- Alberto Sevilla Sacasa, her cousin: Ambassador to Mexico
- Oscar Sevilla Sacasa, her cousin: Minister of Foreign Affairs
- Ramón Sevilla Castellón, her uncle-in-law: former minister and Head of the National Lottery
- Roberto Debayle Sacasa, her brother: Mayor of León
- León Debayle Sacasa, her brother: General Manager of the National Bank, director of the entire banking institution and former ambassador in Washington, D.C.
- Luis Manuel Debayle Sacasa, her brother: President of the National Company of Light and Force of Nicaragua and Minister of Health
- Luis Somoza Debayle, her son: president of the National Congress (chamber of deputies and senators), president of the republic
- Anastasio Somoza Debayle, her son: Chief of staff, director of the Military Academy and president of the republic
- Néstor Portocarrero Gross, her brother-in-law: consul in New York City

== Death ==
Debayle died in February 1987, in Washington, D.C., with her daughter Lillian and her family by her side.

== See also ==
- Somoza family
