= Guillermo Sevilla Sacasa =

Nicaraguan ambassador to the US from 1943 to 1979

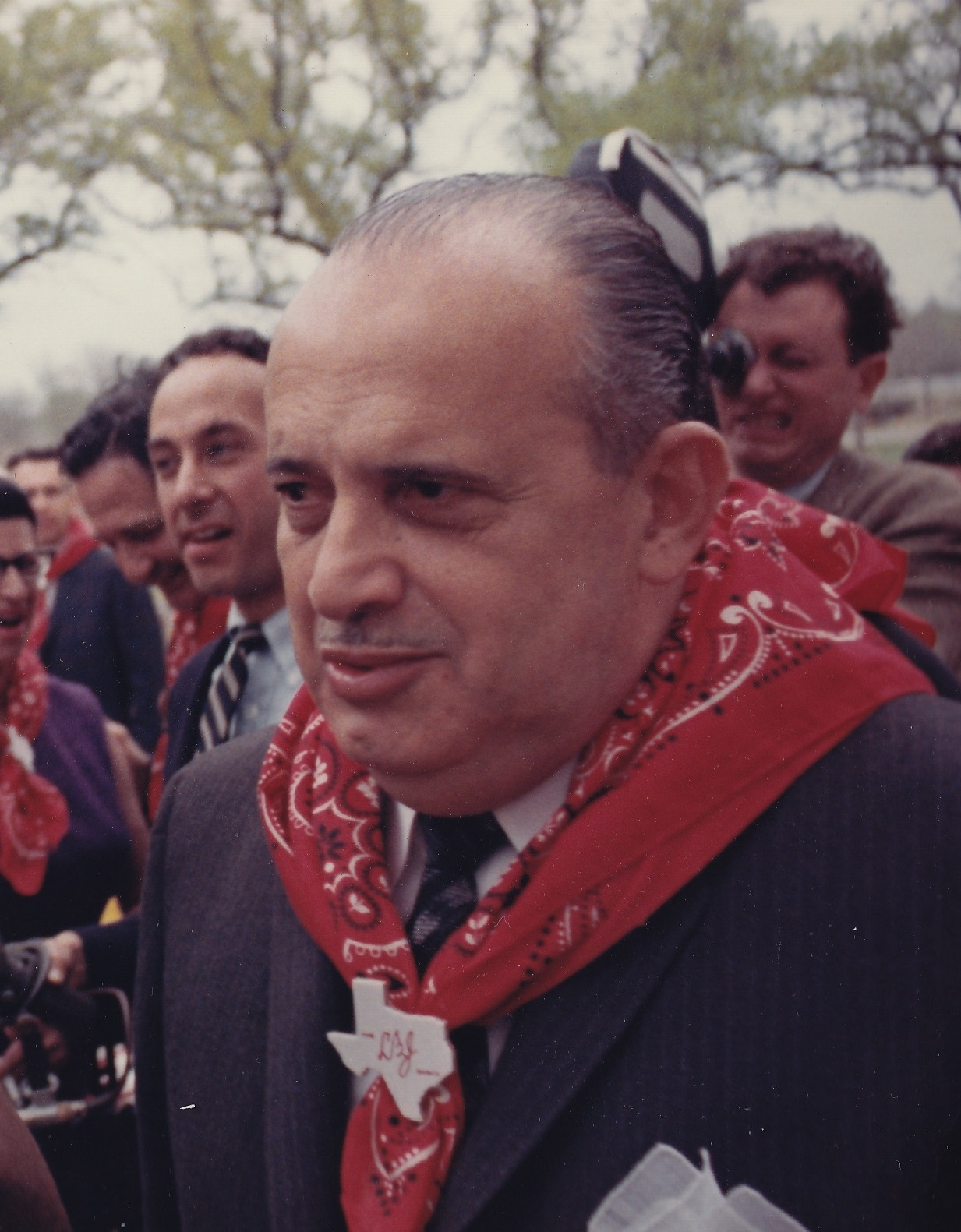
- Sevilla Sacasa in 1967

Ambassador of Nicaragua to the United States
- In office 1943 – July 19, 1979

Personal details
- Born: September 11, 1908 Leon, Nicaragua
- Died: December 16, 1997 (aged 89) Potomac, Maryland, United States
- Spouse: Lillian Somoza Debayle
- Occupation: Judge, president of the lower chamber of National Congress of Nicaragua

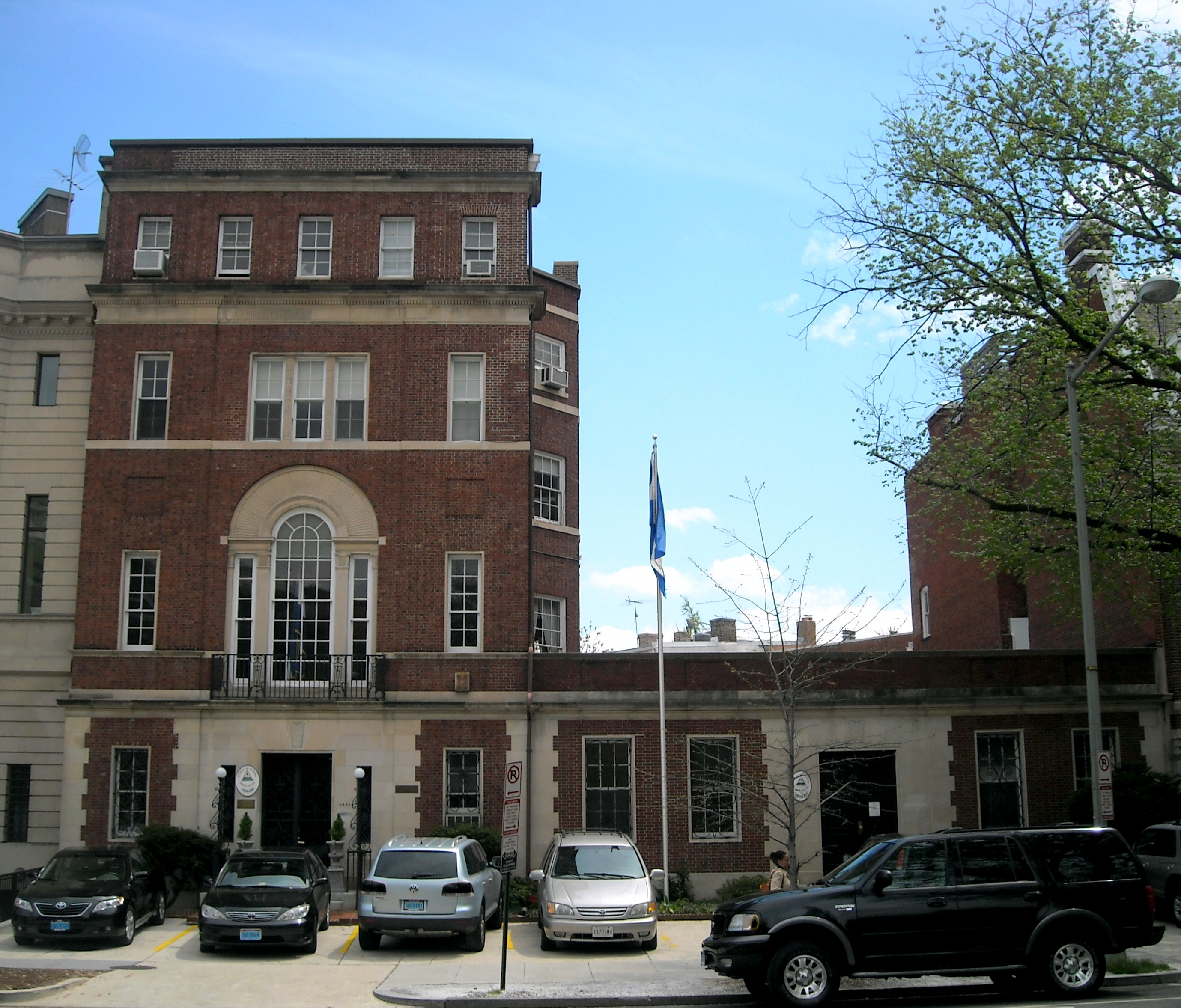
The Embassy of Nicaragua in Washington, D.C., at 1627 New Hampshire Ave NW, where Sevilla-Sacasa had his Chanchery while serving as Nicaraguan Ambassador to the United States.

Guillermo Sevilla Sacasa (September 11, 1908, Leon, Nicaragua – December 16, 1997, Potomac, Maryland, United States) was the Nicaraguan ambassador to the United States from 1943 until July 19, 1979, when President Anastasio Somoza Debayle was forced into exile following the Nicaraguan Revolution. As a result of his record-breaking service as ambassador in Washington, D.C., he was appointed Dean of the Diplomatic Corps, a position he held from January 1958 to July 1979.

He was the son of J. Ramón Sevilla Castellón and wife Dolores Sacasa Sacasa, first-cousin of Juan Bautista Sacasa Sacasa and Benjamin Lacayo Sacasa, 63rd and 69th presidents of Nicaragua respectively. Dolores was the daughter of Antioco Sacasa Sarria, brother of Roberto Sacasa Sarria, 44th and 46th President of Nicaragua. Also, her great-uncle was Vicente Cuadra Lugo, 38th President of Nicaragua.

Known as the "world's most decorated ambassador", he was a judge and president of the Chamber of Deputies from 1936 to 1937. He also served as Ambassador to the U.S. for 36 years under eight American Presidents and eleven Secretaries of State.

In 1943, Sevilla-Sacasa married Lillian Somoza Debayle, born in León, Nicaragua, on May 3, 1921, the daughter of Anastasio Somoza García, the 65th and 69th President of Nicaragua, and Salvadora Debayle Sacasa, and had nine children.
