= Idania Fernandez =

Nicaraguan revolutionary

Idania de Los Angeles Fernandez Ramirez (July 23, 1952 – April 16, 1979) was a Nicaraguan revolutionary in the Sandinista Front.

== Childhood and early education ==
The second out of five children, Idania de Los Angeles Fernández Ramírez spent her early years in León, Nicaragua. At the age of three, her family moved to the neighbourhood of Subtiava on the outskirts of León. She lived in Managua between the ages of six and ten until her family moved to the town of Jinotega in 1962. Three years later, her family returned to Managua, where Idania finished elementary and high school between the years 1965 and 1972 at the French School of the Sacred Heart, the same institution attended by now ex-President Violeta Chamorro.

== From Catholic to revolutionary ==
Idania developed organizational and leadership skills as a member of the group "Las Metanoias" during her senior year in high school. The group took spiritual retreat trips to Hacienda El Tepeyac near Mombacho Volcano and Lake Nicaragua for group study of liberation theology. Idania became an activist, representing her school in various organizations that demanded the release of political prisoners in 1971–1972.

In 1973, her family moved to Panama and she started her college education in Economics at the University of Panama. She resumed her activism, joining the Solidarity Committees in support of the Sandinista Liberation Front prisoners. In 1974, she married David Miranda, a Panamanian-Nicaraguan student of economics. In August 1975, she gave birth to her daughter, who she named Claudia for Claudia Chamorro, another Sandinista who would be killed in action a year later.

== Reunion with the Sandinista leadership ==
Idania first met the Sandinistas in 1974 in Panama, helping them with logistics, including accommodations and supplies.

Idania was considered a participant in the raid at the National Government Palace in 1 which took hostages and handled to the release of several Sandinistas in captivity. Ultimately, Dora María Téllez was chosen, the only woman in the operation, which was named after Rigoberto López Pérez.

== Military training ==
In 1978, following the insurrection in Monimbo (a barrio in Masaya), Idania joined the ranks of the FSLN Command in Panama and Costa Rica, where she frequently met with members of the "Dirección Nacional" (National FSLN Directorate). She trained in Cuba in the middle of 1978.

== Wounded in the southern front ==
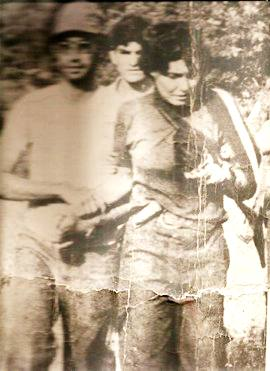
Idania was wounded on the Southern Front, in September 1978

Between 1975 and 1978, Idania made trips to Nicaragua and Costa Rica on clandestine missions, including one trip to the Northern Front and different operatives. In September 1978, she wounded her left hand in combat near the southern border of Nicaragua. She was taken to a Costa Rican hospital near the border. Fearing for her security at the hospital, Sergio Ramírez's wife picked her up and took her to a Sandinista makeshift hospital in Nicaragua near the border.

Upon her return to Panama, the Panamanian military had assigned Secret Service security personnel to high-ranking or identifiable Sandinistas including Idania. She could no longer use her real name or passport on her missions to Nicaragua, or visit public places in Panama without an escort. She was required to carry a high-calibre Magnum pistol in her purse at all times.

After a number of spontaneous uprisings in Monimbo, Matagalpa, Estelí, and other cities that saw the Sandinistas react to rather than control these expressions of discontent, a major shift in Sandinista strategy was developed. In order to take the lead in the Insurrection, two major Insurrectional Commands were organized; the Frente Interno in Managua and the Western Command in the city of León. Idania was assigned to the newly formed Western Insurrectional Command, which required experience with the communities and base organizations ("trabajo de barrios"), worker unions, students, and religious groups and organizing the neighbourhoods for the final offensive.

== Plans for a final insurrection and a new government junta ==
In February 1979, Omar Torrijos, head of the Panamanian government, invited the Grupo de Los Doce, prominent Nicaraguan businessmen backing up the Sandinistas, for talks in Panama. By this time, arms shipments from Venezuela and Cuba were under way. Dr. Joaquín Cuadra, a member of Los Doce and whose son Joaquín Cuadra, leader of the Frente Interno Sandinista Command, was in Nicaragua, invited Idania and Oscar Perez Cassar for the talks and dinner. Idania and Oscar were also members of the Frente Interno, and scheduled to go back to Nicaragua via Honduras, to assume the leadership of the Western Regional Command for the final Insurrection. Sergio Ramírez, also a member of Los Doce and a member of the upcoming Government Junta, relates that Idania attended with her hand still bandaged from surgery after her wounds in September.

In March 1979, Idania went back to Nicaragua to resume her post in the Western Regional Command, and was prepared to stay indefinitely until victory or death, as a member of the ill-fated Insurrectional Command "Rigoberto López Pérez" headed by Dora María Téllez. The Sandinistas sought to finish the Somozas' regime.

== The Swan Over the Burning Coals ==
Sergio Ramírez chose "The swan over the burning coals" for the title of the chapter in his book "Adios Muchachos" dedicated to the memory of the events of the day that shook the entire city of León and the rest of the country. On April 16, 1979, the Sandinista war was escalating quickly, with battles taking place in more than twenty cities in Nicaragua. Most of the leaders of the Revolutionary Government were in Costa Rican or Panamanian safe houses, their tasks were to provide military strategy, negotiate with foreign governments, and develop a plan for the new Nicaraguan Government Junta. All combat operations were organized and led by five separate regional commands throughout the country. The most important ones were the Western Command, based in the City of León, and the Frente Interno, based in Managua. They were considered critical for a fast victory.

On that day, the members of the Western Regional Command integrated by Oscar Pérez Cassar, Idania Fernandez, Araceli Pérez Darias, Edgard Lang Sacasa, Roger Deshon Argüello and Carlos Manuel Jarquin were in session in a safe house in the suburbs of León. The National Guard was attacking the City of Estelí, near the mountains and they were coordinating efforts to help them.

An informant and eighty members of the National Guard, in jeeps and tanks, surrounded the block and stormed into the house. The Sandinistas were unable to escape or to grab their weapons. Morales was able to get into a swimming pool and passed herself off as a resident of the house and ended up as the only survivor. The informant positively identified the men, but he said he did not know the women. Afterwards, all of the men were executed on the spot, while Idania and Darias were arrested, taken to the Fortin of Acosasco, tortured, and murdered.

== The aftermath ==
Thousands attended the funerals of Idania and Darias. The Somoza government refused to return the remains of Darias (a Mexican national) to her family. Idania's parents and two youngest sisters were living in Dallas, Texas, and contacted the Dallas Morning News. The paper dedicated a full-page article on the events in the Sunday edition.

Soon after, in the city of León, guerilla fighters led by Dora María Téllez, Idania's comrade, increased their operational tempo as a result of public outrage over the deaths. In June, victory over the Somoza forces in León was complete, followed by the fall of the capital Managua two weeks later, bringing the Somoza regime to an end.

== Legacy ==
"I leave you an example of life, mine," wrote Idania to her daughter in her farewell letters. Reprinted in Margaret Randall's book Todas Estamos Despiertas.^{[5]} and many columnists' and editorial pages in Nicaragua since her death.Ernesto Cardenal, Sergio Ramirez and other dissidents of the Sandinistas often quote Idania's writings and ideals.

After her death, Idania's reputation grew. In 1984, at the peak of the Contra war, one of the largest battalions of the Sandinista Popular Army (Ejército Popular Sandinista), dispatched to the Northern Front to fight the Contras, was named after her.

There are nurseries and police stations named for her but there are no monuments or statues for her in Nicaragua.
