= Ignacio Chaves Tellería =

Nicaraguan politician

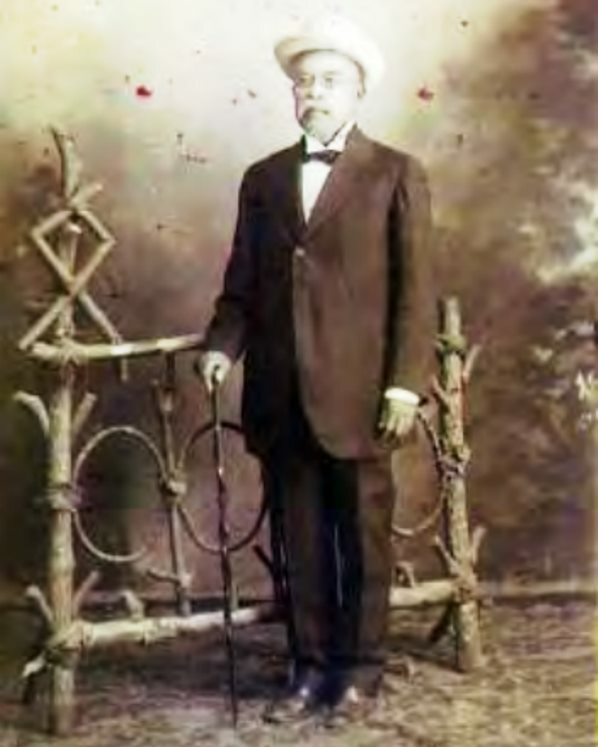
- Chaves in the 1890s

President of Nicaragua
- In office 1 January 1891 – 1 March 1891
- Preceded by: Roberto Sacasa (Acting)
- Succeeded by: Roberto Sacasa

Personal details
- Born: c. 1836
- Died: 1925 (aged 88–89)
- Party: Conservative

Ignacio Chaves Tellería was the President of Nicaragua from 1 January to 1 March 1891. He was born c. 1836 in León, León, Nicaragua and died October 31, 1925, in León, León, Nicaragua. His parents were Eusebio Chaves and Ramona Tellería. He was married to Paulina López and their children were Ignacio, Tránsito, Dagoberto and Eusebio, all Chaves López. His first last name is Chaves, with S, and not Chávez, with accent and Z. Part of the confusion is that some of his children decided to write their last name as Chávez. In addition, people believed his second last name was López. That confusion arose from the fact that his son, Ignacio, wrote his name as Ignacio Chávez López. His registration certificate shows the correct names.

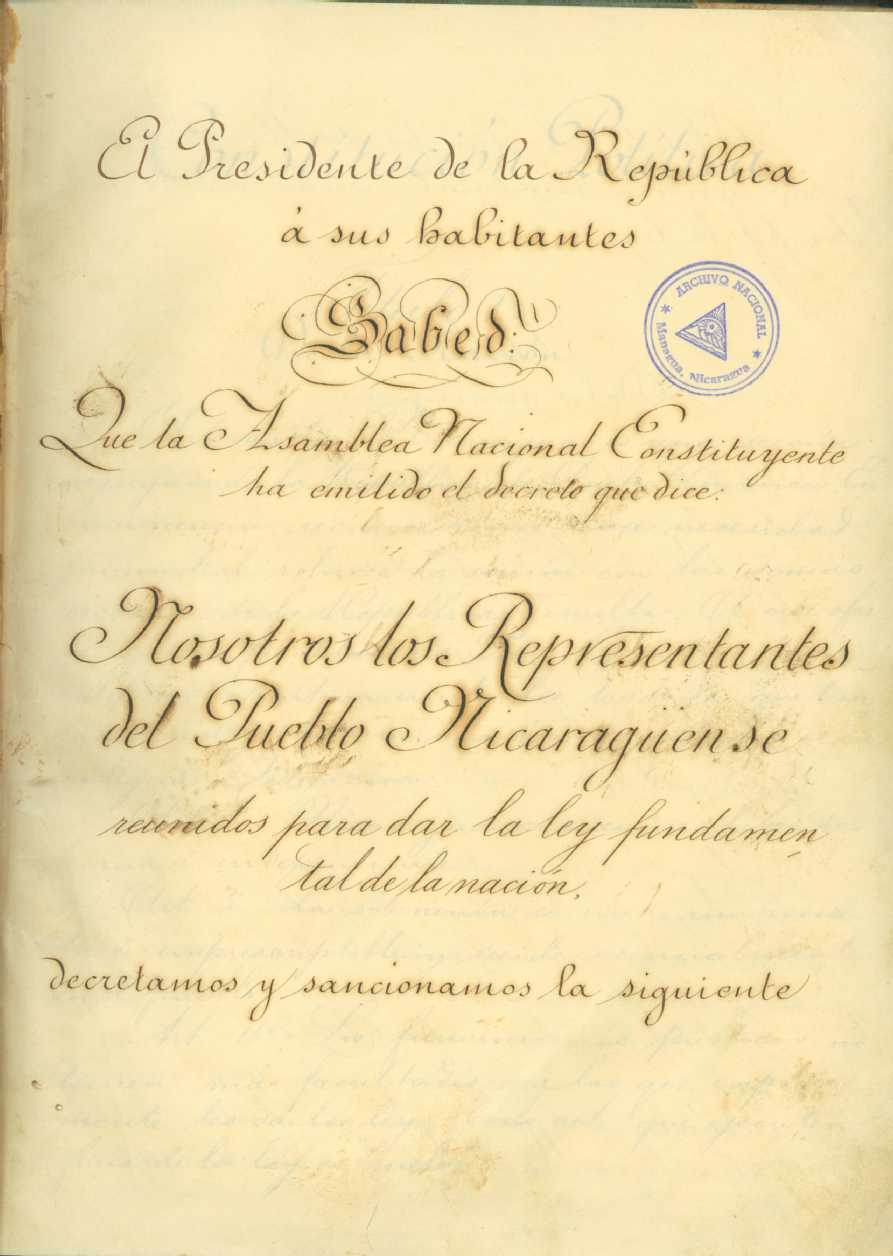
1893 Constitution 1 of 4 pages scanned

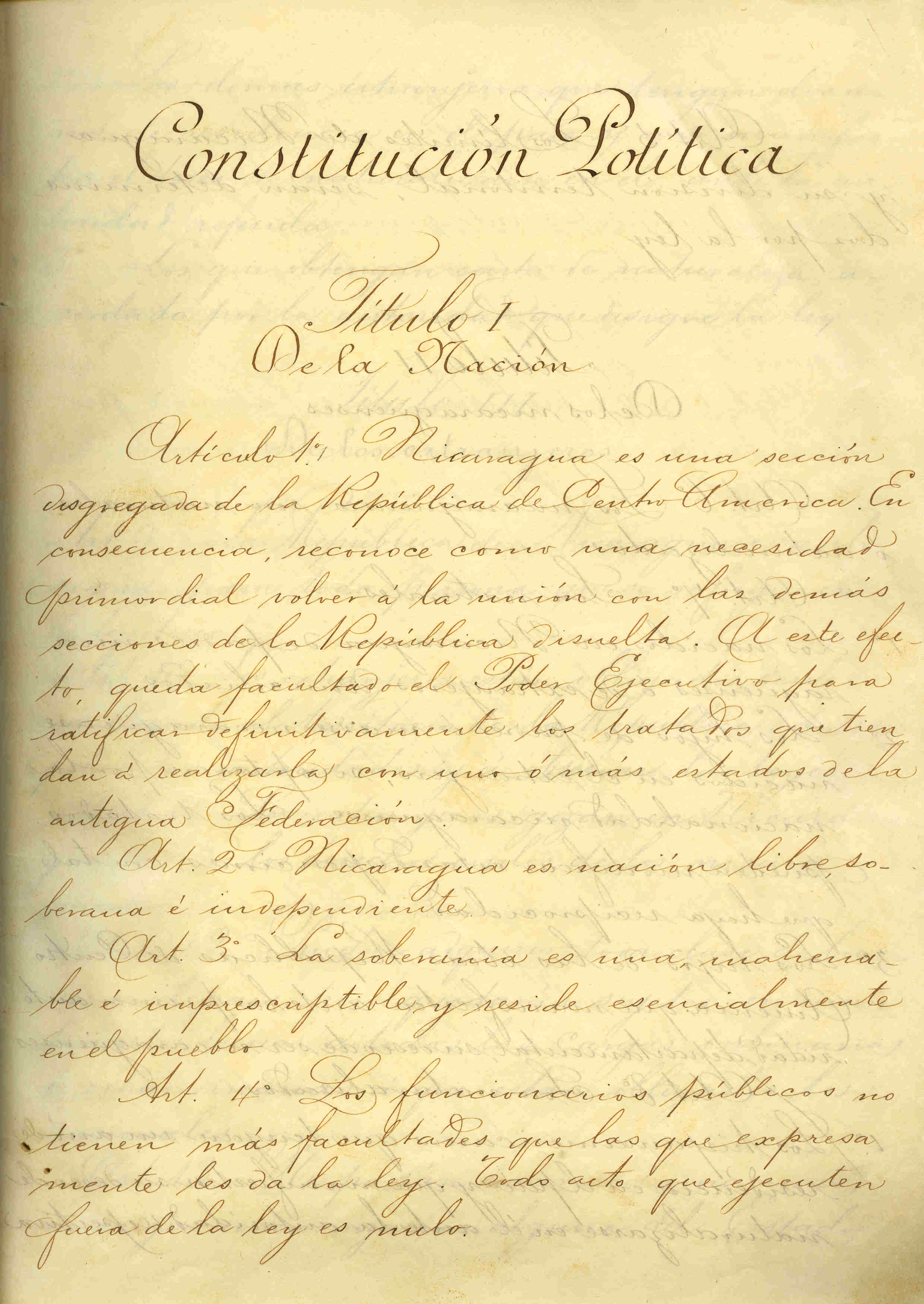
1893 Constitution 2 of 4 pages scanned

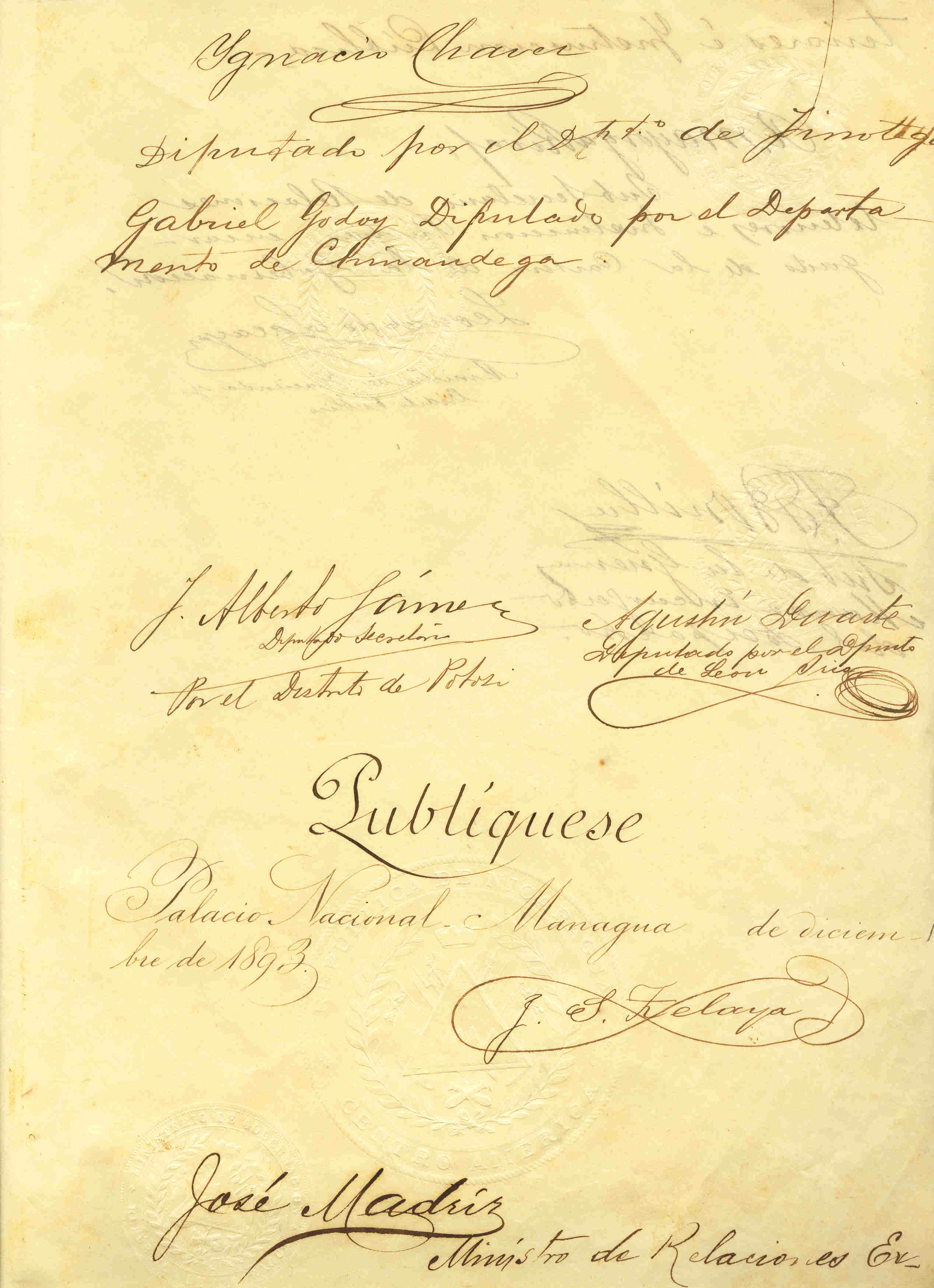
1893 Constitution 3 of 4 pages scanned Ygnacio Chaves signature

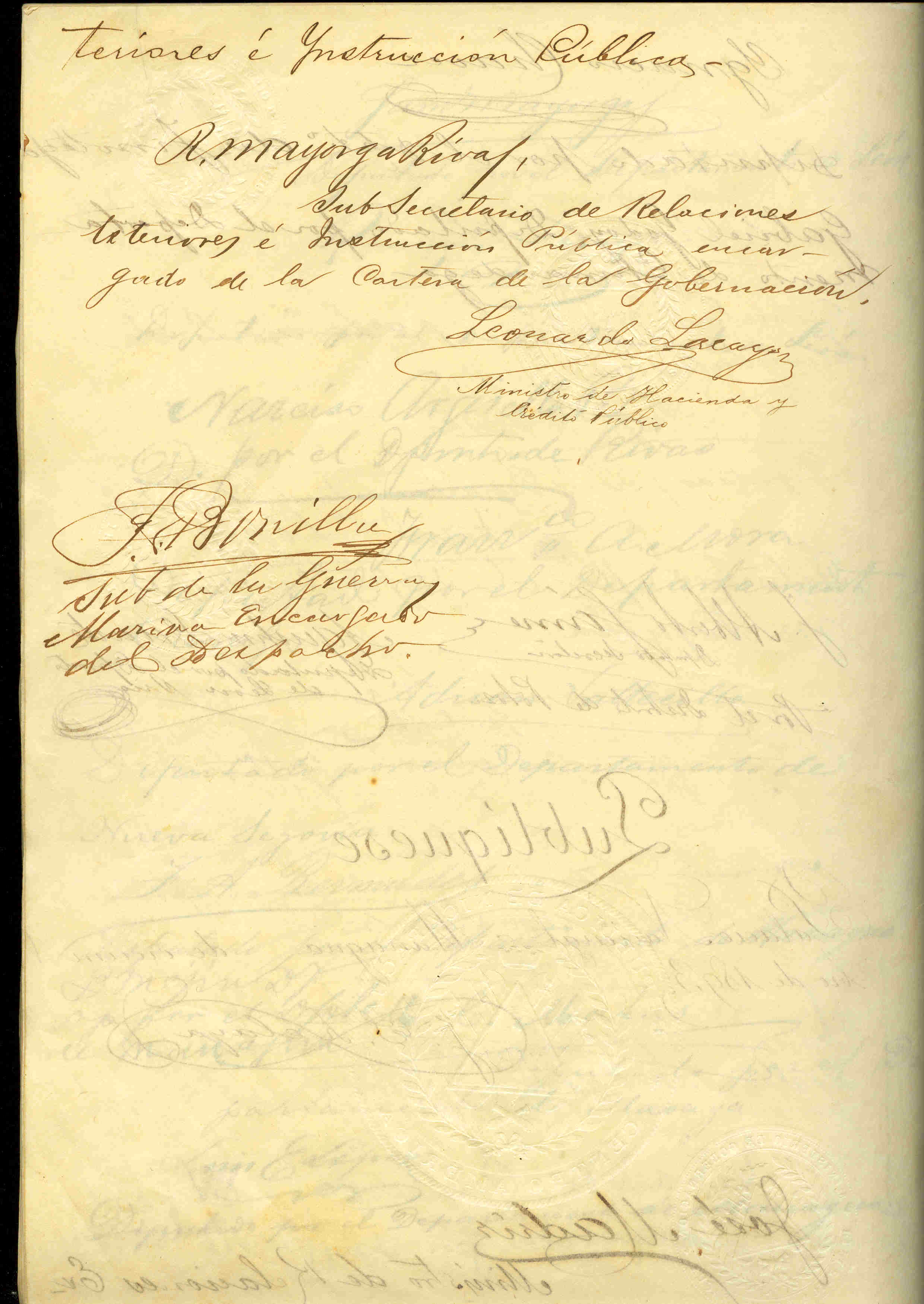
1893 Constitution 4 of 4 pages scanned

Political offices
Preceded by Roberto Sacasa	President of Nicaragua; 1891	Succeeded by Roberto Sacasa
