= Hope Portocarrero =

First Lady of Nicaragua from 1974 to 1979

Hope Portocarrero Debayle
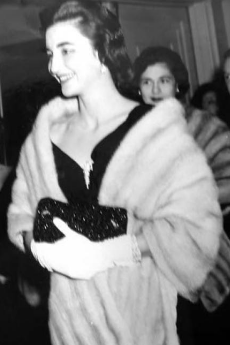
- Hope Portocarrero in 1960s

First Lady of Nicaragua
- In role 1 December 1974 – 17 July 1979
- President: Anastasio Somoza Debayle
- Preceded by: Vacant
- Succeeded by: Maria Luisa Muñoz
- In role 1 May 1967 – 1 May 1972
- President: Anastasio Somoza Debayle
- Preceded by: Carmen Reñazco (1966)
- Succeeded by: Vacant

Personal details
- Born: 28 June 1929 Tampa, Florida, United States
- Died: 5 October 1991 (aged 62) Miami, Florida, United States
- Spouse(s): Anastasio Somoza Debayle; Archie Angelo Baldocchi
- Children: Anastasio, Julio, Carolina, Carla, and Roberto
- Parent(s): Nestor Portocarrero Gross (father); Blanca Debayle Sacasa de Portocarrero (mother)
- Education: Barnard College (BA); Central American University (BL)
- Occupation: Socialite, Writer, First Lady of Nicaragua

Hope Portocarrero Debayle, also known as Madame Somoza and Hope Somoza Baldocchi later in life, (June 28, 1929 – 5 October 1991) was an American socialite and, beginning in 1967, the First Lady of Nicaragua as the wife of president Anastasio Somoza Debayle. In 1968, she was named to the International Best Dressed List. She was the mother of Anastasio Somoza Portocarrero and four other children.

== Early life ==
Born into an old Nicaraguan Catholic family well established in the United States, Hope Portocarrero was the daughter of Dr. Nestor Portocarrero Gross and Blanca DeBayle Sacasa de Portocarrero. She had one brother, Nestor.

She was of Spanish, French, German, Hungarian, Honduran and Nicaraguan descent. Her maternal grandfather was Dr. Louis Henri DeBayle Pallais, who was married to Casimira Sacasa Sacasa; they had eight children together. Louis Henri DeBayle was a good friend of Rubén Darío. One of her maternal great-grandfathers was Roberto Sacasa Sarria, a President of Nicaragua. The DeBayles and Portocarreros were among Nicaragua's wealthiest Creole families.

Hope spoke fluent English, Italian, Spanish, and French and had an appreciation for art and culture. After 1943, she moved to Washington, D.C., where she often spent time with her cousin Lillian Somoza de Sevilla Sacasa. She attended Barnard College and graduated in the class of 1950. Hope spent the summer of 1949 traveling in Europe, accompanied by her mother.

== Marriage ==
Hope Portocarrero Debayle and her cousin Anastasio Somoza Debayle were married on 10 December 1950 in Managua's Cathedral by Archbishop José Antonio Lezcano. Over 4,000 guests attended the ceremony. The reception was given by her father-in-law, President Anastasio Somoza García, in the luxurious and modern Palacio de Comunicaciones. The couple traveled to South America for their honeymoon.

The Somozas had five children: Anastasio, Julio, Carolina, Carla, and Roberto Somoza Portocarrero. Her daughter, Carolina, is married to James Minskoff Sterling, son of New York real estate developer Henry H. Minskoff and his wife.

== First Lady of Nicaragua ==
When her husband became the President of Nicaragua in 1967, Hope Portocarrero became the First Lady. She was covered in the media for her fashionable wardrobe. During her husband's time in office, she served as a hostess during many state visits by foreign leaders, including U.S. President Richard Nixon and Japanese Emperor Hirohito.

Hope was also president of the Junta Nacional de Asistencia y Previsión Social (National Social Security). She created the National Cultural Center, the General Archives of the National Library, National Conservatory of Music, National School of Fine Arts (Bellas Artes), National Museum, and Plurar Gallery. Her biggest legacies were the construction of Teatro Nacional Rubén Darío (The National Theater of Nicaragua), the Children's Hospital, a clinic for Nicaraguan women, and a Center for Orphans, known as "The Hope".

== Final years ==
Due to continuing marital strife, her husband Anastasio began a relationship with a mistress, Dinorah Sampson. Hope later relocated to London. Since the couple were Catholics, she never divorced Anastasio. A year after his assassination, she married Archie Baldocchi, a wealthy US American businessman. Hope died of cancer in Miami, Florida on 5 October 1991.
