= Lillian Somoza de Sevilla Sacasa =

Member of the Nicaraguan Somoza family (1921–2003)

Lillian Somoza Debayle
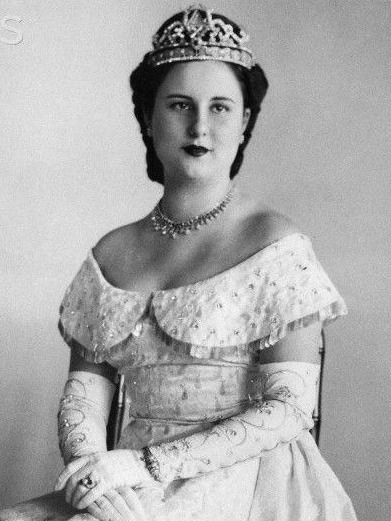
- Lillian Somoza Debayle as "Queen of the Army", c. 1942
- Born: 3 May 1921
- Died: 17 May 2003 (aged 82)
- Spouse(s): Guillermo Sevilla Sacasa (m. 1943–1997; his death)
- Children: 9
- Parent(s): Anastasio Somoza García; Salvadora Debayle de Somoza

Lillian Somoza de Sevilla Sacasa (May 3, 1921 – May 17, 2003), born Lillian Ada de la Cruz Somoza Debayle and commonly known as "Lilly" or "Lilita", was a member of the Somoza family in Nicaragua. She was the daughter of dictatorial president Anastasio Somoza García and Salvadora Debayle de Somoza, the wife of Guillermo Sevilla Sacasa, and the sister of the dictatorial presidents Luis Somoza Debayle and Anastasio Somoza Debayle.

She attended the exclusive young ladies finishing school Gunston Hall School for Girls and in 1940 was chosen queen of the Apple Blossom Festival in Winchester, Virginia.

She died in Washington Hospital Center on May 17, 2003, two weeks after her 82nd birthday.

== Family origins ==
By paternal line, she came from the rural elite in the area of influence of Granada. Her grandfather was the Senator of the Republic, Anastasio Somoza Reyes, a member of the traditionalist Conservative Party, mayor of San Marcos and landowner of the Carazo region. The first Somoza to arrive in Nicaragua in the seventeenth century was the captain of lancers Francisco Somoza, of Galician origin. His great-grandson, the landowner Fernando Somoza Robelo, came to San Marcos, in the current Carazo.

By maternal line, Lillian came from the high elite of the colonial metropolis of León, identified for her time with the also historical Liberal Party. Her grandfather was the famous physician Louis Henri Debayle Pallais, son of the French soldier Louis Emmanuel Debayle Montgofier, who arrived in Nicaragua in the mid-nineteenth century and settled in León. Lillian's maternal grandmother was Casimira Sacasa Sacasa, daughter of President Roberto Sacasa y Sarria. The Sacasas in Nicaragua descend from the Spanish soldier Francisco Sacasa, who died in the eighteenth century as captain commander of the fortress of San Juan.

There are at least eight Presidents of Nicaragua related to Lillian Somoza: Roberto Sacasa (her maternal great-grandfather), José María Moncada Tapia (her uncle by paternal line), Juan Bautista Sacasa (her maternal uncle), Anastasio Somoza García (her father), Víctor Manuel Román y Reyes (her uncle by paternal line), Luis Somoza Debayle (her brother), Anastasio Somoza Debayle (her brother) and Violeta Barrios de Chamorro (her relative by maternal line).

Lillian was the eldest child of the Somoza-Debayle couple. Her early years were spent in her family's manor mansion in León, and later in a palace within the Campo Marte military complex in Managua.

Her photograph was printed on the banknotes of a córdoba, by order of her father, the President of the Republic of Nicaragua, and she was honored by many followers of her father. This note circulated between 1940 and 1960 when in that last year the Central Bank of Nicaragua (BCN) was founded by the president, her brother Luis Somoza Debayle.

Somoza was a very popular figure in Nicaragua during her adolescence after she returned from studying at Gunston Hall School for Girls, a conservative college for women of the high society of the United States, where she shared studies and became close friends with Margaret Truman, the daughter of the future US president Harry S. Truman.

In 1940, she was chosen as Queen of the Shenandoah Apple Blossom Festival in Winchester, one of the 37 "reigns" granted to the General's daughter.

Somoza remained in Nicaragua's public eye before her marriage, as she then went abroad. Only to receive her back in Nicaragua, after completing her education abroad, her father summoned the entire government, the diplomatic corps accredited in the country, the army, relatives and high society to the airport, continuing with dances and cocktail parties in the social clubs, the Presidential Palace, the congress and in the different departments of the country offered by the mayors.

== Queen of the Army ==
By November 1941, Anastasio Somoza García was anticipatingly advancing his campaign to continue in power when his first presidential term ended in 1947, which had been extended to 10 years, through a transitional provision of the constitutional reforms approved by the Constituent Assembly of 1938. Part of his strategy was to make his presence felt in all areas of national life, ensuring that social, political and business life revolved around his person, creating bonds and loyalties.

To make Lillian "queen" of the army in the framework of an event that involved all the departments of the country, since a process was carried out in which local young women were elected as "Departmental Brides of the National Guard", who formed the "Juvenile Court of Bridesmaids" of Queen Lillian I, was to use sentimental and monarchical symbols that strengthened in the national imaginary the figure of the Somozas as the "imperial family of Nicaragua".

Officially, it was said that the initiative to elect Lillian "Queen of the Army" came from the Corporals and Sergeants of the National Guard and was chosen on November 14 for the coronation commemorating the date on which Anastasio Somoza García was appointed Chief of the National Guard. Somoza did not neglect any aspect to strengthen the loyalties of the members of the Army and his control of it.

On November 14, 1941, Somoza was crowned in the Old Cathedral of Managua Queen of the National Guard, by Archbishop José Antonio Lezcano y Ortega. For this occasion, her father ordered that the Guards dress as Roman knights parading through the main streets of Managua in the following order: Herald on foot, Criers on Horses, Fence formed by the "Imperial Guard", carriage of Her Majesty Lillian I, Musical Band of the National Guard and Army Squadrons in field suits.

The celebration continued with a gala at the National Palace with three thousand guests from the most "select" of the country, enlivened by four orchestras. The dress Somoza wore was designed exclusively for her by internationally renowned designer Cristóbal Balenciaga. It was never known how much the dress cost.

It was a highly controversial episode, as it was said that the golden crown of the Virgen de la Candelaria had been used, although in the photographs the tiara on the head of Somoza's daughter is different. There were strong rumors from critics of the family, who claimed that the crown was designed by the jewelry Van Cleef & Arpels and cost $100,000 in the money of the time, also commissioned the creation of a solid gold scepter. However, the official version says that a goldsmith from Masaya, Antonio Moritoy, was the one who made the gold and silver scepter 12 inches high, with four petals, each of them with 33 shiny stones; at the upper end the Scepter wore a gold laurel wreath and a shield of Nicaragua also made of gold, under the shield appeared 16 silver pellets, in addition to 3 large rings engraved in gold. The gold and silver crown, also made by Moritoy, had 52 shiny stones, sapphires and rubies. In the center a gold shield, with rifles on its sides and on top the crown of gold bay leaves, with 10 tiny red rubies embedded in the crown. Below a large heart of gold, with a good-sized red ruby, mounted in relief. Miguel López M., a goldsmith from Managua, made the 21-carat gold ring, which was mounted on its mass two blue sapphires and a white pearl, symbolizing the flag of Nicaragua.

Somoza also received other jewels as a gift. A bracelet inlaid with diamonds placed in the form of a crown, composed of 11 large and 24 small diamonds, was paid to him by the High Officers of the National Guard and was given to him by a commission composed of Colonel Alberto M. Baca, Major Doctor Hermógenes Prado and Captain Roberto Martínez Lacayo in an act that was enlivened by the National Guard Orchestra. Another jeweler from Masaya, Adán Cárdenas, offered him a gold medal in the form of a garland of laurels and a small crown of the kingdom with the initial letter of Lillian's name.

The throne was elaborated by the artist Ernesto Brown and the cordelero José Esteban Flores, who was in charge of manufacturing the carpets that were placed in the National Palace, particularly in the northern part, in the halls in which the coronation and party were held. In addition, hymns and waltzes were created in honor of the "queen".

The royal grace of amnesty to prisoners was not lacking, so the soldiers who for common faults were serving prison guard duty addressed a petition to "Her Majesty Lillian" to intercede on their behalf before her father.

The great coronation parade was held on the afternoon of the 14th, crowds of citizens gathered on the sidewalks to contemplate the passage of that march in the style of the princesses of fairy tales, which left at 4:30 p.m. from the private residence of the president, headed by a herald on foot, followed by criers on horseback, a fence formed by the "Imperial Guard" guarding the chariot of Her Majesty Lillian I, followed by the Musical Band of the National Guard and closing the parade army squadrons in field suits; the parade went through the main streets of downtown Managua, leaving the private residence of the presidential family went north on Bolivar Avenue until reaching Darío Park, passing through the Cathedral Square to take First Avenue East to the north, to the exit house. At night, the streets and squares of Managua, especially illuminated for the occasion, were again crowded with public; in the four corners around the palace beer stalls were set up for those who wanted it. At 9:00 p.m., to the chords of the National Anthem, making their entrance to the Palace through the main door were President Somoza and the First Lady Doña Salvadora, followed by the grandmothers of the Queen, Mrs. Julia García Vda. de Somoza and Mrs. Casimira Sacasa Vda. de Debayle, all standing on the portico of the entrance, accompanied by the Departmental Brides, to receive the Sovereign.

At 9:30 p.m., in an imperial-style carriage pulled by two horses, Lillian made her triumphal entry, accompanied by her bridesmaids: the Bride of the Army of Managua, Miss Lillian Molieri and the Bride of the Army of Carazo, Miss Isabel Genie. They were on seats decorated in blue and white and the wheels of the carriage adorned with roses. Descending from the landó, the Queen was thunderously applauded by the public, being received by her father, who led her through the halls of the palace to her red and silver throne, located in the western garden, while the "imposing" notes of the Hymn to the Queen of the Army were played.

The Archbishop of Managua, Monsignor José Antonio Lezcano y Ortega, accompanied by the Vicar Monsignor Vélez, the parish priest Pbro. Manuel Argüello and Father Carranza, performed the coronation, imitating the style of European monarchies, in which the highest ecclesiastical dignity performs coronation ceremonies.

Later "Queen Lillian" made deliveries of gold and precious stones decorations to the organizers of the event and went on to dance the first piece with her father. Four orchestras enlivened the party that lasted until 4:00 in the morning; two orchestras were located on the ground floor and two others on the top floor of the Palace: the National Guard Orchestra, the Black Cat, the Vega Matus and the GNOW of the artists Urroz.

In 1942, Somoza participated in the Darian festivities, where she distributed the Rubén Darío awards. The following year she would have a more prominent role in these activities and had a park and an avenue named in her honor, "Lillian", in the vicinity of the old Presidential Palace of the Loma de Tiscapa in the capital Managua. Her image often appeared in the newspapers and magazines of society of the time.

== Wedding and family ==
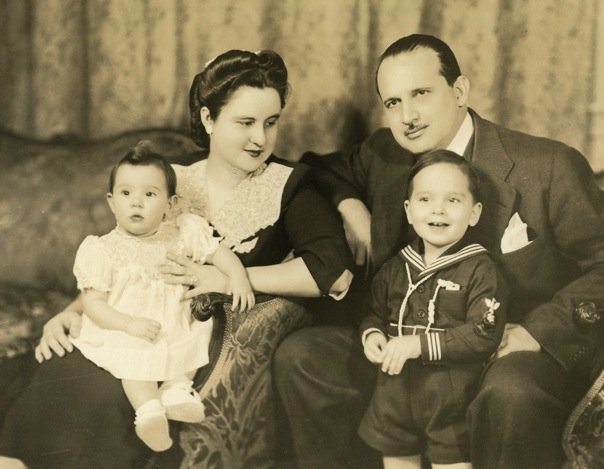
Lillian Somoza Debayle and her husband Guillermo Sevilla Sacasa with two of their young sons, c. 1950

She was married on February 1, 1943 (her father's birthday) to her relative Guillermo Sevilla Sacasa, who was Nicaragua's ambassador to the United States for 36 years until 1979. The luxury wedding had as best man President Rafael Ángel Calderón Guardia of Costa Rica and his Belgian wife Yvonne Clays Spoelders, who gave the bride and groom all the floral arrangements from Heredia with which a carpet was made that extended from the Presidential Palace to the cathedral, where the archbishop was to marry off the bride and groom; half a kilometer covered with gardenias, roses and carnations, on a silk background. In addition, the godparents gave the couple a check worth $6,000.

Fifteen of Somoza's friends traveled to Mexico and New York with the goal of buying gifts for the wedding ceremony. Twenty-six silver games competed against each other from different European countries. The directors of the country's mining companies gave their wedding gifts to Somoza by giving $4,600 and $3,000. The wedding ring was valued at $20,000. Among the gifts Somoza received from her parents was a huge orchid of gold and diamonds. The total value of the gifts is said to have amounted to half a million dollars.

The music bands toured the streets of the capital and President Somoza inaugurated the Presidential or Monumental Tribune and six paved blocks of the Somoza Boulevard and the Lillian garden.

The civil marriage was held at the National Palace a few hours before the religious act; District Judge Dr. Zúñiga Osorio made the legal liaison. The wedding procession and about a thousand guests gathered in the north wing of the National Palace, including Costa Rican President Calderón Guardia and his wife. The plaza was "illuminated like day" with about a thousand electric lamps in three rows. Fifteen thousand people from the audience crowded to witness the procession, including numerous people from the cities connected by the railroad who arrived in Managua especially to witness the celebrations of the wedding whose religious ceremony began at ten o'clock at night.

Upon entering the cathedral, they passed through a steel arch formed by the sabers of a group of cadets from the Military Academy, dressed in luxurious gala costumes, the National Guard orchestra executed the wedding march of Félix Mendelssohn and a march written especially for the wedding by the artist Lieutenant GN Félix Vega Miranda. The matrimonial arras and thirteen coins of pure gold were mounted on an artistic cameo.

After the religious ceremony, the Sevilla-Somoza spouses led the wedding procession in a parade again through the Plaza to the National Palace, where it was dissolved, passing the guests to the great dance in the Presidential Palace in the Loma de Tiscapa. The Ramírez Velázquez de Masaya orchestras and the National Guard orchestra alternated in the execution of the dance program that ended at three in the morning.

Journalists from across the continent flew in to cover the news of the wedding, including the famous Universal Newsreel.

When Somoza left with her husband to Washington D.C. to represent Nicaragua diplomatically, she donated her luxurious residence in Managua to the Ministry of Foreign Affairs, which she met during the time that her family ruled the nation. The mansion was popularly known as the Lillian House.

In Washington D.C. she was known in society as the "Ambassadress" for being the consort of the ambassador dean of the diplomatic corps. Despite constant pregnancies, Somoza was in charge of the public relations of the embassy and the preparations of dinners and galas in her mansion, where she and her husband entertained dozens of guests, including diplomats and millionaires. She had 20 pregnancies but gave birth to only nine children:

- Guillermo Anastasio (born 1944)
- A miscarriage in 1945
- Lillian Salvadora (born 1946)
- A miscarriage in 1947
- Luis Ramón (born 1948)
- A miscarriage in 1949
- Edda María (born 1950)
- A miscarriage in 1952
- A miscarriage in 1953
- Julia Dolores (born 1954)
- Lorena Isabel (born 1955)
- A miscarriage in 1956
- A miscarriage in 1957
- Eduardo José (born 1958)
- Alejandro Javier (born 1959)
- A miscarriage in 1960
- A miscarriage in 1961
- Bernardo David (born 1962)
- A miscarriage in 1964
- A miscarriage in 1965

Upon the assassination of her father, Somoza and her brothers Luis and Anastasio inherited one of the largest fortunes in Latin America.

== Death ==
Somoza died at Central Hospital in Washington DC, United States, at the age of 82, on May 14, 2003.
