= Anastasio Somoza Portocarrero =

Nicaraguan American heir (born 1951)

- Born: 1 February 1951 (age 75); Miami, Florida, U.S.
- Education: Kent School; Sandhurst; Harvard University (BEc)
- Occupations: Serviceman, businessman
- Title: Colonel
- Parent(s): Anastasio Somoza Debayle; Hope Portocarrero

Anastasio Somoza Portocarrero (born 1 February 1951) is a Nicaraguan American former colonel and businessman.

== Early life and education ==
Anastasio Somoza Portocarrero was born on December 18, 1951, in Miami, Florida, United States. A member of the Somoza family, he is a son of former Nicaraguan president Anastasio Somoza Debayle and Hope Portocarrero; he is also a grandson of Anastasio Somoza García. Also known as El Chigüín—"The little child”—Somoza Portocarrero had been the heir apparent to the Somoza family regime prior to the ouster of his father by the Marxist Sandinistas in 1979. By early 1978, Somoza Portocarrero had reportedly taken on the appellation "apprentice dictator" and assumed full control of the Somozas' estimated $1 billion business empire, however, by mid-1979 the family had fallen from power and would be forced into exile.

He was educated in the United States, including at Kent School in Kent, Connecticut, Harvard University in Cambridge, Massachusetts, and in England, at Sandhurst. His sister, Carolina, is married to James Minskoff Sterling, son of New York real estate developer Henry H. Minskoff.

== Career ==
He became a colonel in the Nicaraguan military, which was run by his family. He played an active role in the armed forces during the Sandinista insurrection, and the National Guard unit which he commanded "was accused of widespread human rights violations in the final days of the civil war." Like all combatants during the 1979–1989 period, Somoza Portocarrero was included against his wishes in the Blanket Amnesty demanded by the FSLN from incoming President Violeta Chamorro in 1990.

In early 1980, the new Sandinista government formally accused Somoza Portocarrero of masterminding the 1978 assassination of opposition journalist Pedro Joaquín Chamorro Cardenal, and a June 1981 trial that convicted nine people of the crime implicated him but did not go as far as naming him as a defendant in absentia. In 1980, Sandinista officials also issued a warrant for Somoza Portocarrero's arrest on charges that he embezzled $4 million in governmental funds (via dummy corporations) while his father was still in power. He was living in Miami at the time, and he was not extradited because the US Department of State considered the charges to be politically motivated and thus allowed the matter to die.

False reports that Somoza Portocarrero might return to Nicaragua in 2000 after over twenty years in exile led to an uproar in that country. Former Sandinista President Daniel Ortega suggested that Somoza Portocarrero "will be able to enter Managua, but I doubt he will be able to leave because I will confront him with gunshots." Sitting President Arnoldo Alemán—whose own political party in part grew out of the old Somoza party—said that Nicaraguans "reject the announced visit of Somoza Portocarrero, whom public opinion considers one of those principally responsible for the destruction, suffering, violations and spilling of blood dramatically suffered by Nicaraguans throughout their history." Somoza Portocarrero was falsely reported to have planned to return for a political rally but ultimately this was found to be invented by Alemán.

== See also ==
- National Guard (Nicaragua)
- Nicaraguan Revolution
- Contras
