= Isabel Urcuyo =

Costa Rican-born diplomat (1924–2014)

Isabel Urcuyo de Somoza
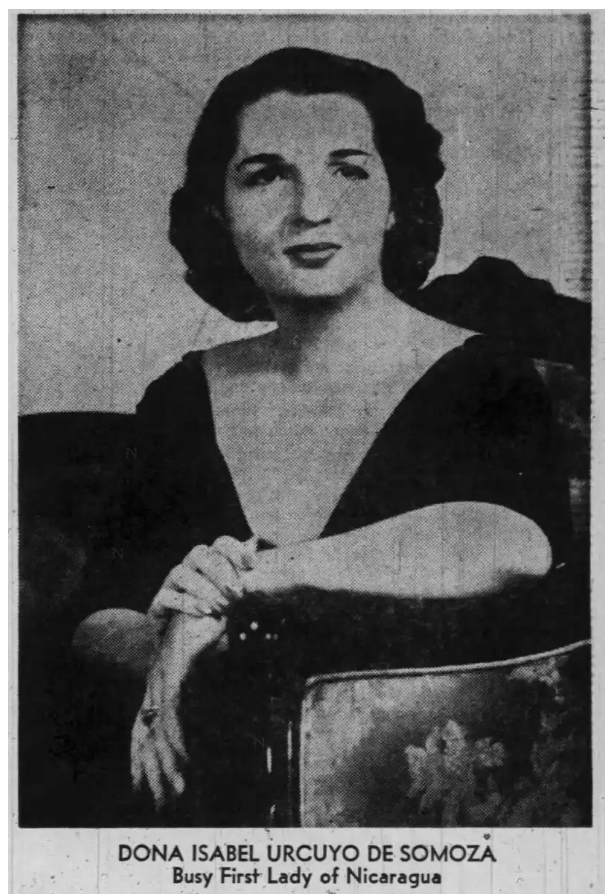
- Doña Isabel Urcuyo de Somoza, December 1959

First Lady of Nicaragua
- In office 29 September 1956 – 1 May 1963
- President: Luis Somoza Debayle
- Preceded by: Salvadora Debayle
- Succeeded by: Carmen Reñazco

Personal details
- Born: Rosa María Isabel Urcuyo Rodríguez; 31 July 1924 Costa Rica
- Died: 30 August 2014 (aged 90) Houston, Texas, United States
- Spouse: Luis Somoza Debayle (m. 1947; died 1967)
- Children: 7
- Occupation: Diplomat
- Awards: Order of the Precious Crown

Rosa María Isabel Urcuyo Rodríguez de Somoza (31 July 1924 – 30 August 2014) was a Costa Rican-born diplomat and the First Lady of Nicaragua from 1957 to 1963 as the wife of President Luis Somoza Debayle.

== Biography ==
Rosa María Isabel Urcuyo Rodríguez was born in Costa Rica on 31 July 1924. Her father was Clodomiro Urcuyo Argüello, a wealthy Nicaraguan who owned large areas of land in northern Costa Rica and served as Minister of Education in the government of Juan Bautista Sacasa. Her mother was Costa Rican Amalia Rodríguez. By maternal line, she was descended from the Costa Rican oligarchy. Isabel was the youngest of a family of four children; her siblings were Vicente (a Nicaraguan ambassador to Spain), Clodomiro, and Anita. She studied at the Colegio La Asunción de Managua, where she earned a bachelor's degree in science and literature. She learned English with a private US American tutor.

She married Luis Somoza Debayle on 9 June 1947, who flew to San José to court her, as she spent seasons with relatives there. They had met as neighbors when they were children. When Luis returned to Nicaragua as an adult, they soon became engaged. Their civil marriage took place at the Urcuyo house in Managua, and a religious ceremony was held in the Archbishopric, followed by a reception at the Palacio de la Curva in the Loma de Tiscapa. Isabel was frequently pregnant during her union with Luis, giving birth to seven children in just 12 years.

Isabel Urcuyo de Somoza accompanied her husband at the historic summit held in Costa Rica in 1963, attended by the presidents of Central America and U.S. President John F. Kennedy. She also made several successful tours of Mexico, the United States, Europe, and Japan, where she was decorated by Emperor Hirohito with the Order of the Precious Crown for fostering friendly relations between his country and Nicaragua. She was also decorated by Pope John XXIII in Rome.

As First Lady, she was known for charitable works, particularly those benefitting children, and organizing social assistance programs. When Luis left office, he and Isabel took a trip around the world. After his death from a heart attack on 13 April 1967, she was made an honorary consul of Nicaragua in New York and ambassador to the United Nations. After the Sandinista Revolution, Daniel Ortega and subsequently Violeta Chamorro denied her entry to Nicaragua. She was granted a visa during the government of Arnoldo Alemán. She moved to Houston, Texas in the early 1990s.

Isabel Urcuyo de Somoza died in Houston on the morning of 30 August 2014.

== See also ==
- Somoza family
