= Luis Somoza Debayle =

President of Nicaragua from 1956 to 1963

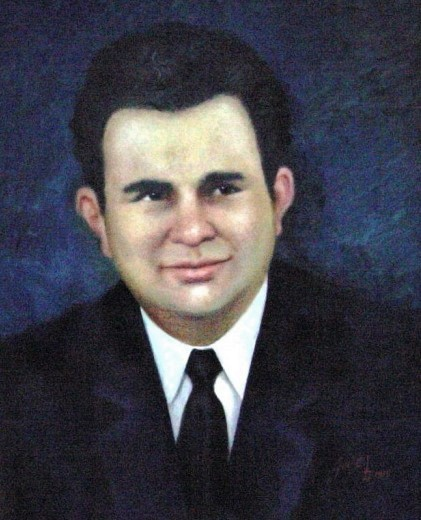
- Somoza in 1956

30th President of Nicaragua
- In office 3 February 1957 – 1 May 1963; Acting: 29 September 1956 – 3 February 1957
- Vice President: Vacant
- Preceded by: Anastasio Somoza García
- Succeeded by: René Schick

Personal details
- Born: 18 November 1922 León, Nicaragua
- Died: 13 April 1967 (aged 44) Managua, Nicaragua
- Party: Nationalist Liberal Party (PLN)
- Spouse: Isabel Urcuyo (m. 1947)
- Children: 7
- Parents: Anastasio Somoza García (Father); Salvadora Debayle (Mother)

Luis Anastasio Somoza Debayle (18 November 1922 – 13 April 1967) was the 30th President of Nicaragua from 1957 until his resignation in 1963. He succeeded to the presidency following the death of his father, Anastasio Somoza García. The Somoza family was the most powerful family in the country at that time.

== Biography ==
Somoza Debayle was born in León on 18 November 1922. In 1936 at the age of 14, he and his younger brother Anastasio attended Saint Leo College Prep near Tampa, before transferring to La Salle Military Academy on Long Island. Luis was then educated at Louisiana State University, where he was a member of Fi Sigma Alfa Hispanic fraternity. He married Costa Rican Isabel Urcuyo on 9 June 1947, and they had seven children together.

Following the assassination of his father, Anastasio Somoza García, Luis was tapped as acting president, and was elected president in his own right the following year. His rule was somewhat milder than that of his father. However, civil liberties remained restricted, and corruption remained widespread.

His brother, Anastasio Somoza Debayle, headed the National Guard and was the second most powerful man in the country during his older brother's rule. Although Luis declined to run for reelection in 1963, he and Anastasio saw to it that the presidency was held from 1963 onward by politicians loyal to the Somozas. As a result, Luis remained the de facto leader of Nicaragua until his death in 1967, when he suffered a massive heart attack in Managua at the age of 44.

Luis Somoza was the president of the Chamber of Deputies of National Congress of Nicaragua on two occasions (1953–1954 and 1955–1956), and the president of the Senate from 1965 to 1966.

Under Luis Somoza's regime, Nicaragua played a key role leading to the creation of the Central American Common Market, with the Alliance for Progress backing that common market's creation. During the Bay of Pigs Invasion, he allowed the CIA-trained Cuban rebels to embark from Puerto Cabezas, on Nicaragua's Caribbean coast. The Sandinistas began their struggle against the government in 1961 – a struggle that would oust his brother in 1979.

== Death ==
He died at home on April 13, 1967, due to a heart attack. That place is now the Ministry of Defense. He is entombed at Cementerio Occidental with his father, in the National Guard Mausoleum in Managua, Nicaragua. His wife Isabel moved to Houston, Texas in the early 1990s, and died there in 2014.

== See also ==
- National Guard (Nicaragua)

== Footnotes ==
Political offices
Preceded by Anastasio Somoza García	President of Nicaragua; 1956–1963	Succeeded by René Schick
