= Anastasio Somoza Debayle =

President of Nicaragua (1967–72; 1974–79)

Major General Anastasio Somoza Debayle
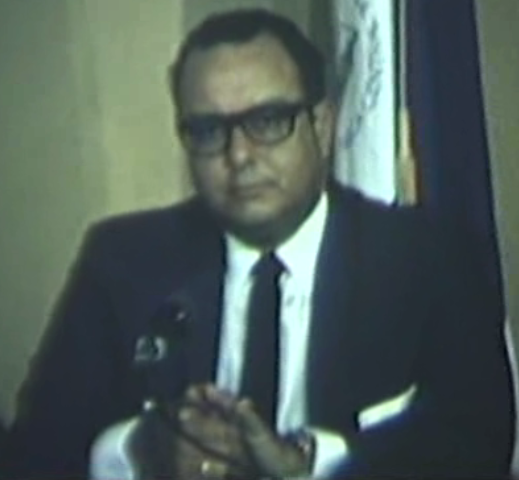
- Somoza in 1968

53rd President of Nicaragua
- In office 1 December 1974 – 17 July 1979
- Vice President: Vacant
- Preceded by: Liberal-Conservative Junta
- Succeeded by: Francisco Urcuyo (Acting)
- In office 1 May 1967 – 1 May 1972
- Vice President: First Vice President; Francisco Urcuyo; Second Vice President; Alfonso Callejas Deshón
- Preceded by: Lorenzo Guerrero Gutiérrez
- Succeeded by: Liberal-Conservative Junta

Personal details
- Born: 5 December 1925 León, Nicaragua
- Died: 17 September 1980 (aged 54) Asunción, Paraguay
- Cause of death: Assassination (gunshot wounds)
- Resting place: Caballero Rivero Woodlawn Park North Cemetery and Mausoleum
- Party: Nationalist Liberal Party (PLN)
- Spouse: Hope Portocarrero (m. 1950; sep. 1970)
- Children: Anastasio Somoza Portocarrero, Julio Somoza Portocarrero, Carolina Somoza Portocarrero, Carla Somoza Portocarrero, Roberto Somoza Portocarrero
- Parents: Anastasio Somoza García (father); Salvadora Debayle (mother)

Military service
- Allegiance: Nicaragua
- Branch/service: National Guard
- Years of service: 1946–1979
- Rank: Major general
- Battles/wars: Nicaraguan Revolution

Anastasio "Tachito" Somoza Debayle (Spanish: [anasˈtasjo soˈmosa ðeˈβajle]; 5 December 1925 – 17 September 1980) was a Nicaraguan politician, military officer, hydraulic engineer, and dictator who served as the 53rd President of Nicaragua from 1967 to 1972 and again from 1974 until his fall in 1979. As head of the National Guard, he was de facto ruler of the country between 1967 and 1979, even during the period when he was not the de jure ruler.

Somoza Debayle succeeded his older brother, Luis Somoza Debayle, in office. He was the last member of the Somoza family to be president, ending a dynasty that had been in power since 1937. After insurgents led by the Sandinista National Liberation Front (Spanish: Frente Sandinista de Liberación Nacional; FSLN) were closing in on Managua in July 1979, Somoza fled Nicaragua. Power was ceded to the Junta of National Reconstruction. He was assassinated in 1980 while in exile in Paraguay.

== Early life and education ==
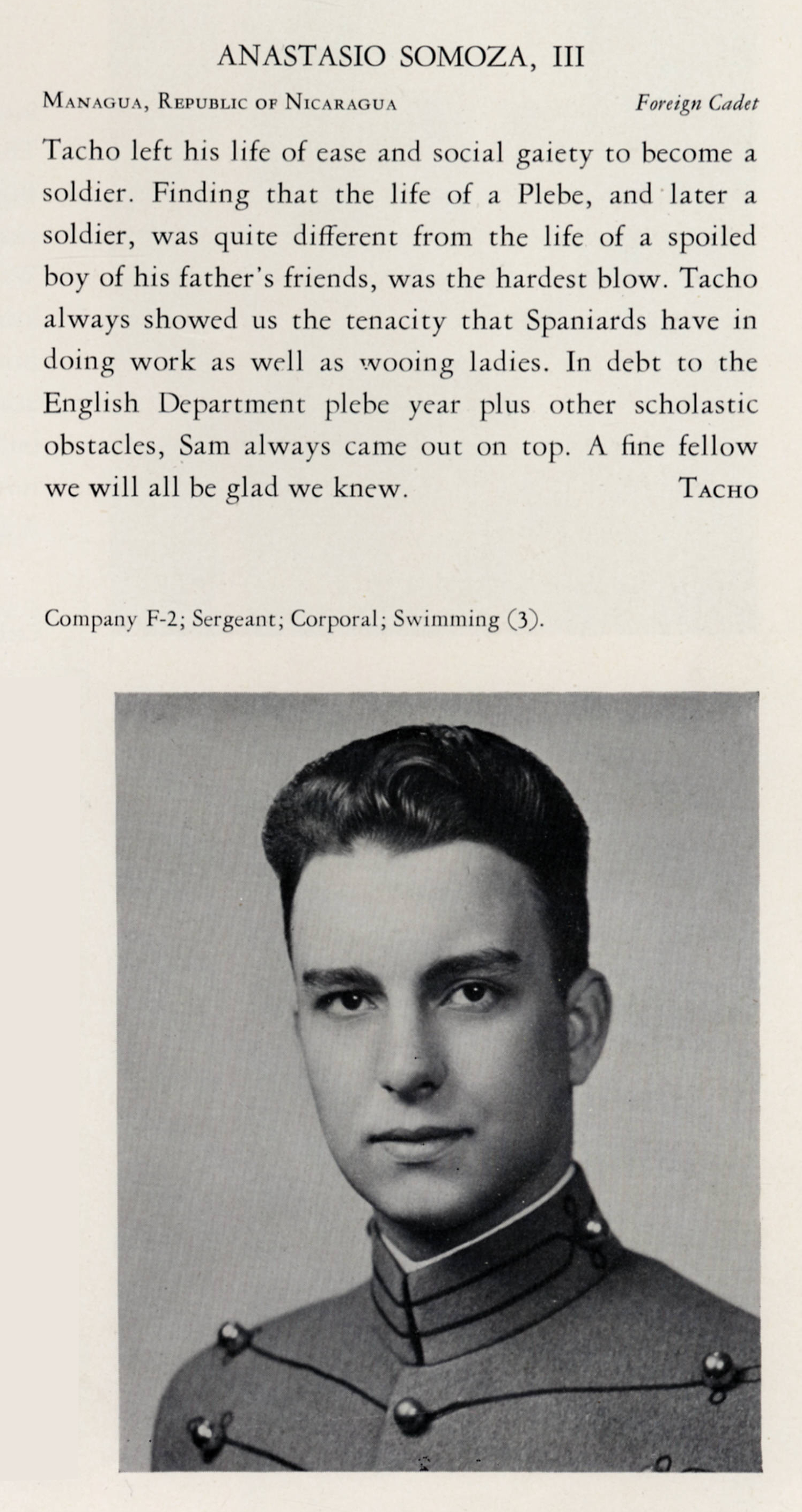
Somoza Debayle in the United States Military Academy yearbook, 1946

Somoza Debayle, nicknamed "Tachito" (Spanish: Little Tacho) by his father, was born in 1925 as the third child of Anastasio Somoza García and Salvadora Debayle. At the age of seven, he was enrolled at the Instituto Pedagógico La Salle, run by the Christian Brothers. One of his classmates was Pedro Joaquín Chamorro Cardenal, who later became a journalist and publisher of La Prensa newspaper and one of the most prominent opponents of the Somoza dynasty.

From the age of ten, Tachito was educated in the United States. During this period, their father became president of Nicaragua, and served from 1937 to 1947, and again from 1950 into 1956. He and older brother Luis Somoza Debayle both attended St. Leo College Prep (Florida) and La Salle Military Academy on Long Island.

Somoza attended La Salle with Lt. Andrew Edward Tuck III, uncle of American television host Stephen Colbert, and would stay at the family home in Larchmont during the holidays instead of returning to Nicaragua. This led to Somoza going on several dates with Andrew Edward's sister and Colbert's mother, Lorna.

Somoza Debayle passed the examination for West Point, entered the United States Military Academy on July 3, 1943, and graduated on June 6, 1946.

After his return to Nicaragua, Somoza Debayle was appointed chief of staff of the National Guard (Nicaragua's national army), by his father. The president had also appointed numerous family members and close personal friends to other important posts in his government. As commander of the Guard, the young Somoza was head of the nation's armed forces, effectively the second-most powerful man in Nicaragua.

Two years after his return from West Point, Somoza Debayle had an affair and fathered a daughter, Patricia. She was later sent to a series of schools abroad.

On 10 December 1950, Somoza married Hope Portocarrero, an American citizen and his first cousin. Their wedding was held at the Cathedral in Managua and officiated by Archbishop Jose Antonio Lezcano. Over 4,000 guests attended the ceremony. The reception was given by Somoza's father, President Anastasio Somoza García, in the luxurious and modern Palacio de Comunicaciones.

The couple had five children:

- Anastasio Somoza Portocarrero
- Julio Somoza Portocarrero
- Carolina Somoza Portocarrero, married to James Minskoff Sterling, son of New York real estate developer Henry H. Minskoff
- Carla Somoza Portocarrero
- Roberto Somoza Portocarrero

Somoza and Hope attended the coronation of Queen Elizabeth II in 1953.

Following their father's assassination on 21 September 1956, Somoza's elder brother, Luis, took over the presidency. Anastasio also had a large hand in the government during this time; he helped ensure that the presidency was held by politicians loyal to his family from 1963 to 1967.

== Presidency ==
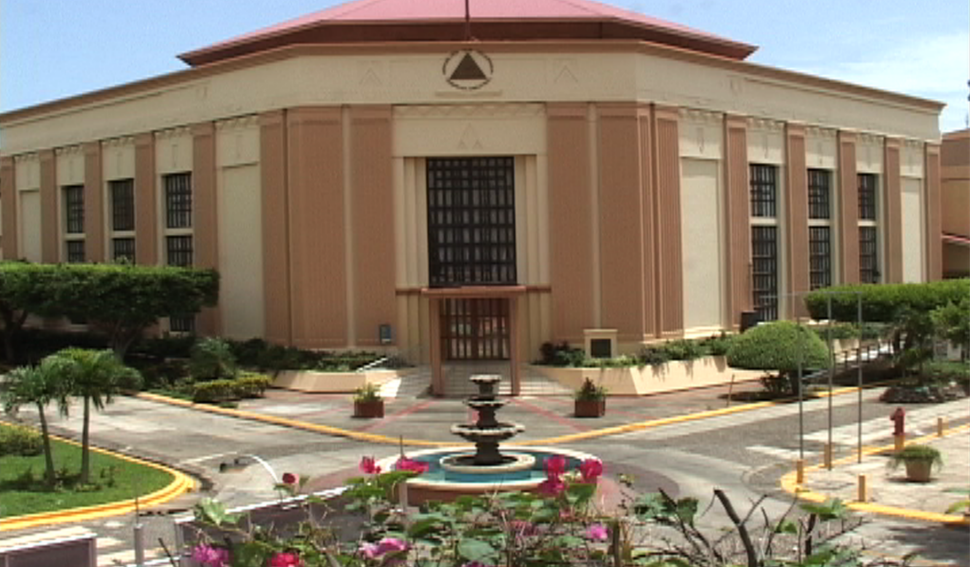
Place of the Assembly of Nicaragua, where the National Guard killed more than 1,000 protesters against the election of Somoza

Anastasio was elected president in his own right on 5 February 1967 and took office on 1 May, a few weeks after his brother's death. While Luis had ruled more gently than his father, Anastasio shared his father's cold intolerance of dissent. His rule soon resembled his father's in all significant respects, with harsh repression of dissent.

On education Somoza in his memoirs states "My dream was to provide a University equal to any in the world so that those young men and women with special qualifications could achieve educational equivalency with any student in any part of the world". However according to Thomas H. Holloway while visiting Costa Rica while a colleague boasted of the schools the government was building Somoza's father, Anastasio Somoza García famously replied, “I don’t want an educated population; I want oxen.” Holloway concludes that "The dehumanization of the population throughout the region led to a policy of slaughter." According to Penny Lernoux a rural teacher from a school that had been closed by the National Guard, during Anastasio Somoza's Presidency, said “Teaching people to think is the worst crime you can commit under the Somoza government.”

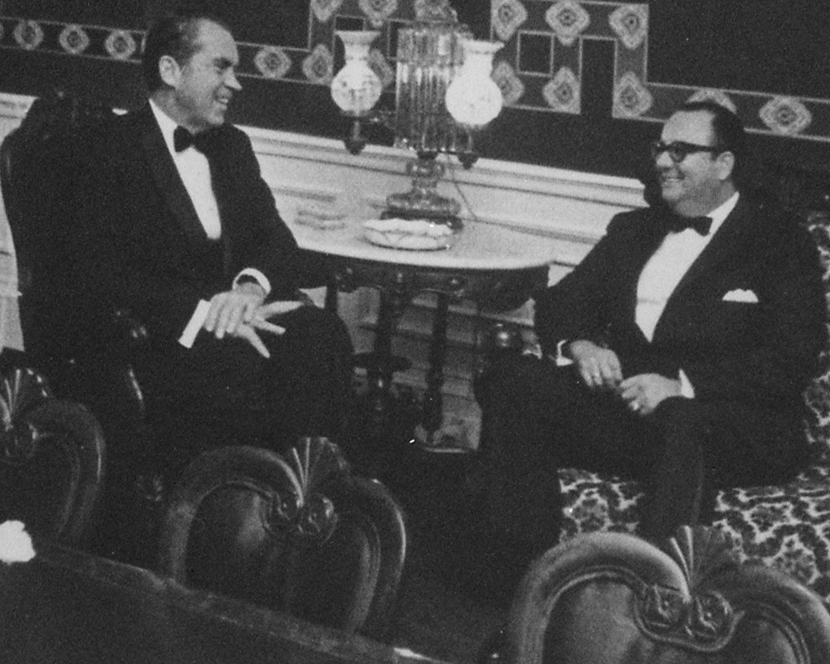
Somoza with U.S. President Richard Nixon, 2 June 1971.

In 1968, Prince Rainier III bestowed Somoza with the Order of St. Charles, Monaco's highest honor.

He was due to leave office in May 1972; at the time, Nicaraguan presidents were barred from immediate re-election. However, prior to that, Somoza worked out an agreement that allowed him to stand for re-election in 1974. He would be replaced as president by a three-man junta consisting of two members of his Nationalist Liberal Party and one member from the opposition Conservative while he retained control of the National Guard. Somoza and his triumvirate drew up a new constitution that was ratified by the triumvirate and the cabinet on April 3, 1971. He stepped down as president on May 1, 1972. However, as head of the National Guard, he remained the de facto ruler of the country.

Anastasio Somoza and his son were both part owners of Plasmaferesis. The company collected blood plasma from up to 1,000 of Nicaragua's poorest persons every day for sale in the United States and Europe. According to El Diario Nuevo and La Prensa, "Every morning the homeless, drunks, and poor people went to sell half a liter of blood for 35 (Nicaraguan) cordobas".

On 23 December 1972, an earthquake struck the nation's capital, Managua, killing about 5,000 people and virtually destroying the city. The government declared martial law, and Somoza took over de jure as well as de facto control of the country as head of the National Emergency Committee. He reportedly embezzled a large amount of money from funds sent to Nicaragua from around the world to help rebuild Managua.

Some parts of Managua have yet to be rebuilt or restored, including the National Cathedral.

Somoza also allegedly exported freshly imported emergency blood plasma abroad at the time of the earthquake, when most medical supplies in Nicaragua were desperately in short supply.

Somoza was re-elected president in the 1974 election. By this time, the Catholic Church had begun to speak out against his government (one of his fiercest critics was Ernesto Cardenal, a leftist Nicaraguan priest who preached liberation theology and was later appointed as the Sandinista government's Minister of Culture). By the late 1970s, human rights groups were condemning the record of the Somoza government. Support for the Sandinistas was growing inside and outside the country.

In July 1977, Somoza had a heart attack, and went to the US to recuperate.

== Fall ==
In 1975 Somoza Debayle launched a campaign to crush the Sandinistas; individuals suspected of supporting the Front were targeted. The Front, named after Augusto César Sandino, began its guerrilla war against the Somozas in 1963. It received funds from the Soviet Union and Cuba under Fidel Castro. Support for the Sandinistas ballooned after the earthquake, especially when U.S. President Jimmy Carter withdrew American support for the regime for human rights reasons, including the televised murder of American journalist Bill Stewart by government soldiers. At this point, the opposition to the Somozas included not only Sandinistas, but other prominent figures such as publisher Pedro Chamorro (assassinated on January 10, 1978).

Because of Somoza's status, most of his family members were forced to flee to Honduras, Guatemala, and the United States. It is uncertain where the surviving Somozas live; they changed their names to protect their own lives.

On July 17, 1979, Somoza resigned from the presidency and fled to Miami in a converted Curtiss C-46. He took with him the caskets of his father and brother and, it is claimed, much of Nicaragua's national treasure. The country was left with $1.6 billion in foreign debt, the highest in Central America. After Somoza had fled, the Sandinistas found less than $2 million in the national treasury.

Denied asylum in the U.S. by President Carter, Somoza later took refuge in Paraguay, then under the rule of Alfredo Stroessner. He bought a ranch and a gated house at Avenida España no. 433 in Asunción, the capital. The president of the Nicaraguan Chamber of Deputies, Francisco Urcuyo, took over as acting president, but lasted only a day before peacefully handing Managua to the Sandinistas.

== Death ==
Little more than a year later, Somoza was shot dead in Asunción on September 17, 1980. He was 54 years old. He was ambushed by a seven-strong Sandinista commando team (four men and three women). The action was known as "Operation Reptile".

The Sandinista team were armed with two Soviet-made machine guns, two AK-47 assault rifles, two automatic pistols, and an RPG-7 rocket launcher, with four anti-tank grenades and two rockets. The leader was Argentinian Marxist revolutionary Enrique Gorriarán Merlo (code named "Ramon"), an ex-Ejército Revolucionario del Pueblo member. One of the team members said: "We cannot tolerate the existence of millionaire playboys while thousands of Latin Americans are dying of hunger. We are perfectly willing to give up our lives for this cause."

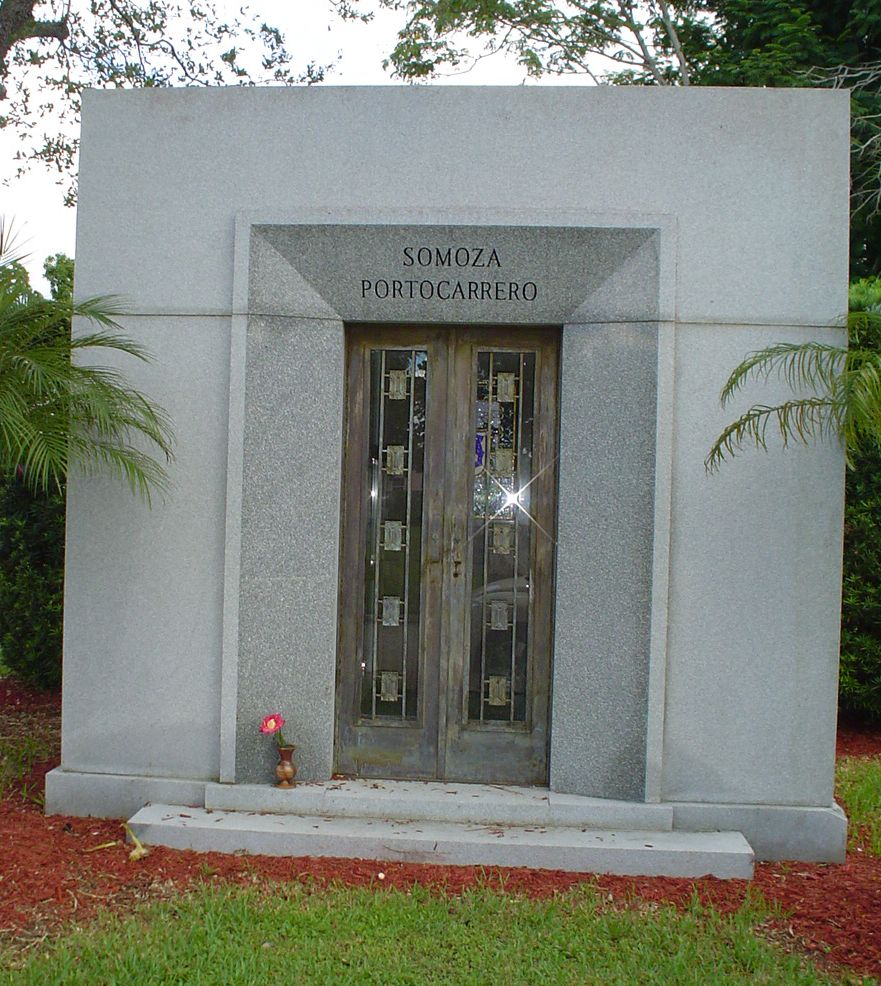
Somoza family mausoleum

The Sandinista team had researched and planned their assault for over six months. The team studied Somoza's movements via a team member who was staked out at a newspaper kiosk near the estate. The commando team also utilized disinformation tactics to gain access into important residencies under the guise of a famous name, that being Julio Iglesias. They waited in ambush for Somoza in Avenida España. Somoza was often driven about the city in a Mercedes-Benz S-Class sedan, which was believed to be unarmored. Team member Oswaldo, disguised as a paper boy, watched Somoza exit the estate at 10:10 am and gave a signal.

Once in position, Hugo Irurzún (Capitán Santiago) readied the RPG-7. He tried to fire an anti-tank rocket at the car, but the RPG-7 misfired. Ramon shot the chauffeur while Irurzún quickly reloaded the RPG with a new rocket. The second rocket directly hit the sedan. Accounts said that the car's engine kept running after the rocket explosion. Previously, the commando team had considered the possibility that Somoza's vehicle might be equipped with armor panels in front. Worried that it could deflect the rocket projectile, they chose to make a lateral attack on the vehicle. Somoza was killed instantly and burned, along with his new driver, César Gallardo, and Somoza's financial advisor, Colombian citizen Jou Baittiner. Later media reports in Paraguay said that Somoza's body was so badly burnt that it was unrecognizable and forensics had to identify him through his feet.

Of the seven assassins, six escaped. Irurzún was killed in a shootout with Paraguayan police the day after the assassination.

Somoza was buried in Miami, at Woodlawn Park Cemetery and Mausoleum, although his father Anastasio Somoza García and brother Luis Somoza Debayle, both prior presidents of Nicaragua, were buried in Nicaragua. A few months before Somoza's murder, his memoirs, Nicaragua Betrayed, were published. He blamed the Carter administration for his downfall. His son, Anastasio Somoza Portocarrero, went into exile in Guatemala.

Brian Latell, a former US National Intelligence Officer for Latin America and Cuba, argues in his book, After Fidel, that the plan to assassinate Somoza was devised in Havana, with direct input from Fidel Castro. According to him, the Sandinistas had won power in July 1979 with the assistance of massive, covert Cuban military aid. Fidel and his brother Raúl Castro purportedly developed a complex, multinational covert action to provide the Sandinistas with huge quantities of modern armaments. Latell claims Cuban intelligence and paramilitary advisors poured into Nicaragua along with the equipment. He says the evidence indicated that Somoza's assassination was similar to other such operations in which Cuban intelligence had been involved. He says that Somoza was a long-time nemesis of Castro after having provided critical support to the U.S. in preparing for the Bay of Pigs Invasion of Cuba in April 1961. Jorge Masetti, a former Argentine guerrilla working with Cuban intelligence services, describes the Somoza assassination and also asserts that Cuba had a direct role in planning it in his memoir, In the Pirate's Den (2002).

Somoza's funeral attracted numerous wealthy Nicaraguan and Cuban exiles in South Florida, who protested the left-wing governments of Nicaragua, led by the Sandinista National Liberation Front, and Cuba, led by the Communist Party of Cuba. But some commentators noted that the exiles in Miami were also relieved at Somoza's death. The newly founded Contra army, which consisted of many ex-members of Somoza's National Guard, would have had to give the impression of having no relation to the old Somoza regime, for purposes of public relations and world opinion.

In 1979, the Brazilian newspaper Gazeta Mercantil estimated that the Somoza family's fortune amounted to between $2 billion and $4 billion with its head, Anastasio Somoza Debayle, owning $1 billion. At the time he fled the country, he reportedly personally controlled 22 percent of the agricultural land of Nicaragua.

== In popular culture ==
Somoza was the subject of the 1983 film Last Plane Out, in which he was portrayed by actor Lloyd Battista. The film chronicles journalist Jack Cox's journey to Nicaragua, when Somoza was battling insurgents. The same year, he was depicted in Under Fire, set during the 1979 Nicaraguan Revolution, this time portrayed by actor René Enriquez. In Warren Beatty's Rules Don't Apply, Somoza is portrayed by Julio Oscar Mechoso.

In Graham Greene's novel The Captain and the Enemy, the titular character's final act is a failed attempt at assassinating Somoza by crashing a plane into his bunker, though Somoza himself never appears in the book.

American comedian Stephen Colbert's mother briefly dated Somoza. Colbert still has his pants in his house, as mentioned in the podcast Strike Force Five.

== Publications ==
=== Books ===
- Nicaragua Betrayed, with Jack Cox. Belmont, Mass.: Western Islands (1980). ISBN 978-0882792354. Full text.

== See also ==
- National Guard (Nicaragua)
- Nicaraguan Revolution

== Bibliography ==
- Alegria, Claribel, and Flakoll, Darwin J. Death of Somoza. Curbstone Press, 1996.
- Berman, Karl. Under the Big Stick: Nicaragua and the United States Since 1848. South End Press, 1986.
- Booth, John A. The End And The Beginning: The Nicaraguan Revolution. Westview Press, 1985.
- Booth, John A. and Thomas W. Walker. Understanding Central America. Westview Press, 1999.
- Christian, Shirley. Nicaragua: Revolution in the Family. Vintage Books, 1986.
- Crawley, Eduardo. Dictators Never Die: Nicaragua and the Somoza Dynasty. Palgrave Macmillan, 1979.
- Diederich, Bernard. Somoza and the Legacy of U.S. Involvement in Central America. Markus Wiener Publishers, 2007.
- Dillon, Sam. Comandos: The CIA and Nicaragua's Contra Rebels. Henry Holt & Co., 1992.
- Kinzer, Stephen. Blood of Brothers: Life and War in Nicaragua. David Rockefeller Center for Latin American Studies, 2007.
- Lake, Anthony. Somoza Falling: A Case Study of Washington at Work. University of Massachusetts Press, 1990.
- Leiken, Robert S. (ed.) and Barry M. Rubin (ed.). The Central American Crisis Reader. Summit Books, 1987.
- Merrill, Tim (ed.). Nicaragua: A Country Study. Federal Research Division, Library of Congress, 1995.
- Millett, Richard. Guardians of the Dynasty. Orbis Books, 1977.
- Norsworthy, Kent and Tom Barry. Nicaragua: A Country Guide. Inter-Hemispheric Education Resource Center, 1990.
- Pastor, Robert A. Condemned to Repetition: The United States and Nicaragua. Princeton University Press, 1987.
- Pezzullo, Lawrence and Ralph Pezzullo. At the Fall of Somoza. University of Pittsburgh Press, 1994.
- Rees, John (ed.). Ally Betrayed...Nicaragua. Western Goals, 1980.
- Somoza, Anastasio (as told to Jack Cox). Nicaragua Betrayed. Belmont, MA: Western Islands, 1980.
- Towell, Larry. Somoza's Last Stand: Testimonies from Nicaragua. Red Sea Press, 1990.
- Walker, Thomas W. Nicaragua: Living in the Shadow of the Eagle. Westview Press, 2003.
- Zimmermann, Matilde. Sandinista: Carlos Fonseca and the Nicaraguan Revolution. Duke University Press, 2001.

Political offices
Preceded by Lorenzo Guerrero	President of Nicaragua; 1967–1972	Succeeded by Liberal-Conservative Junta
Preceded by Liberal-Conservative Junta	President of Nicaragua; 1974–1979	Succeeded by Francisco Urcuyo
