= Second Battle of Masaya =

- Part of the Filibuster War
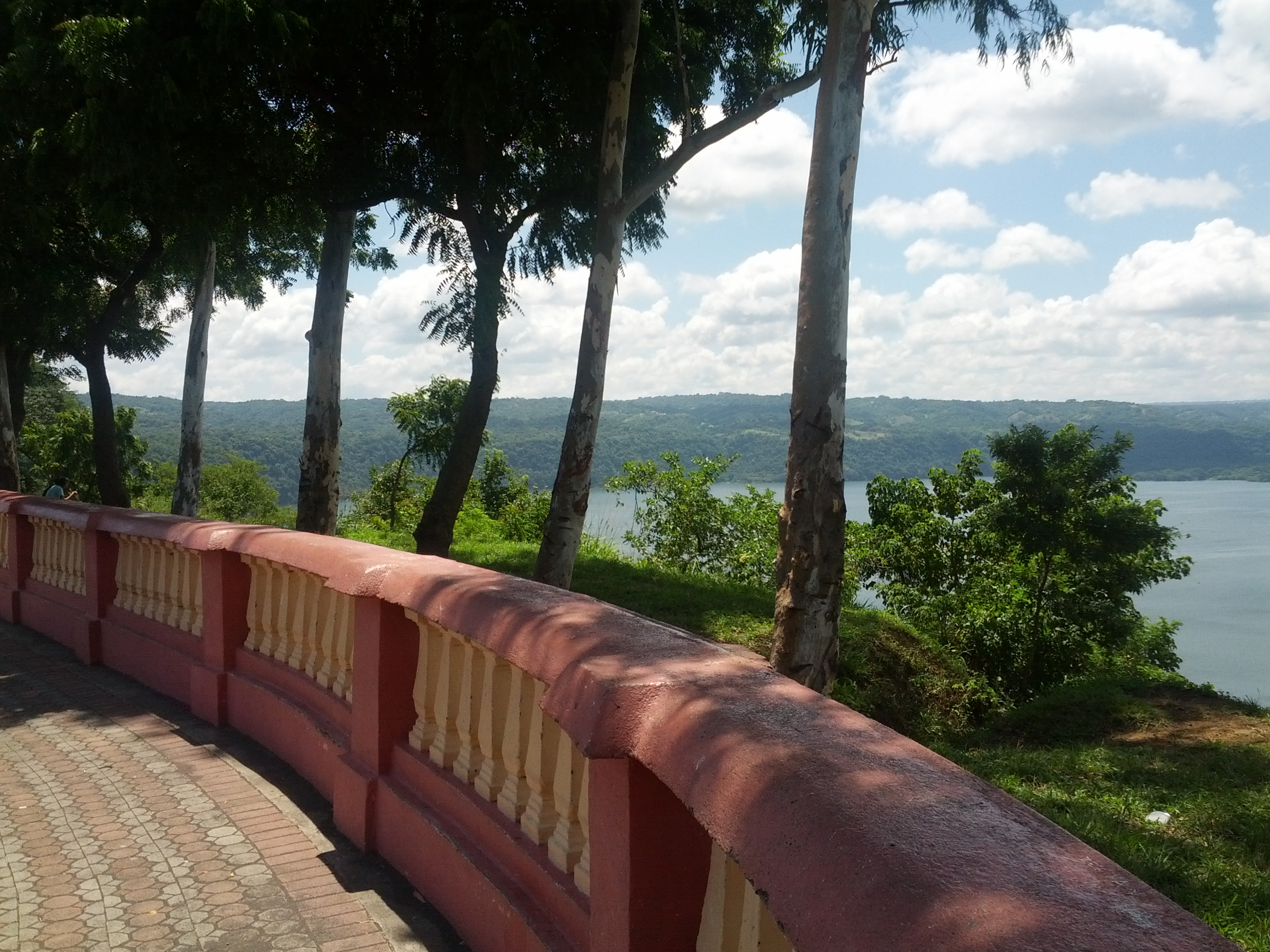
- The pier in Masaya
Date	15–17 November 1856
Location	Masaya, Nicaragua
Result	Allied victory; Filibusters repulsed

Belligerents
Filibusters	Allied Central American Army (Ejército Aliado Centroamericano): Nicaragua; Costa Rica; Honduras; Guatemala; El Salvador

Commanders and leaders
William Walker	Ramón Belloso

Strength
350 Filibusters	~3,000

Casualties and losses
150 killed and wounded	46 killed and 90 wounded

The Second Battle of Masaya (15 November 1856 – 17 November 1856) took place in the town of Masaya, northwest of William Walker’s filibuster capital, Granada. Having fought an inconclusive battle there the previous month, Walker again aimed to capture the valuable fortified town. The assault and subsequent siege of the town was inconclusive, as the heavy losses suffered on both sides still did not produce a definitive result, with Walker’s men withdrawing back to Granada after three days and nights of fighting. This loss drove Walker to not only abandon his vulnerable capital at Granada, but also to burn it to the ground.

== Background ==
After the unsuccessful First Battle of Masaya in October, Walker knew that an enemy force encamped so nearby made his position in Granada untenable. After driving Jose Maria Cañas out of La Virgen at the Battle of the Transit on November 11, and with the return of the experienced General Charles Frederick Henningsen to his force, Walker felt confident in his victorious army's ability to retake Masaya. Walker and his men embarked from La Virgen to Granada, there mustering 550 men. On the morning of the 15th, Walker and this force set off in the direction of Masaya. However, halfway to their destination, Walker received news that 800 men under General Máximo Jerez had departed Masaya in order to reinforce Cañas’ defeated army at Rivas. This newly mobile force threatened the transit link under Walker’s control, so Walker peeled off 200 men with orders to reinforce the garrison left to man the recently captured transit city of La Virgen. Left at this point with only 350 men, Walker inexplicably decided to carry on with the assault on Masaya. As explained by Daniel Bedinger Lucas, Walker’s “mania for assaulting fortified towns with an inferior force” is what motivated the decision to attack. Whatever the reason, on the 15th of November, Walker’s force arrived at Masaya.

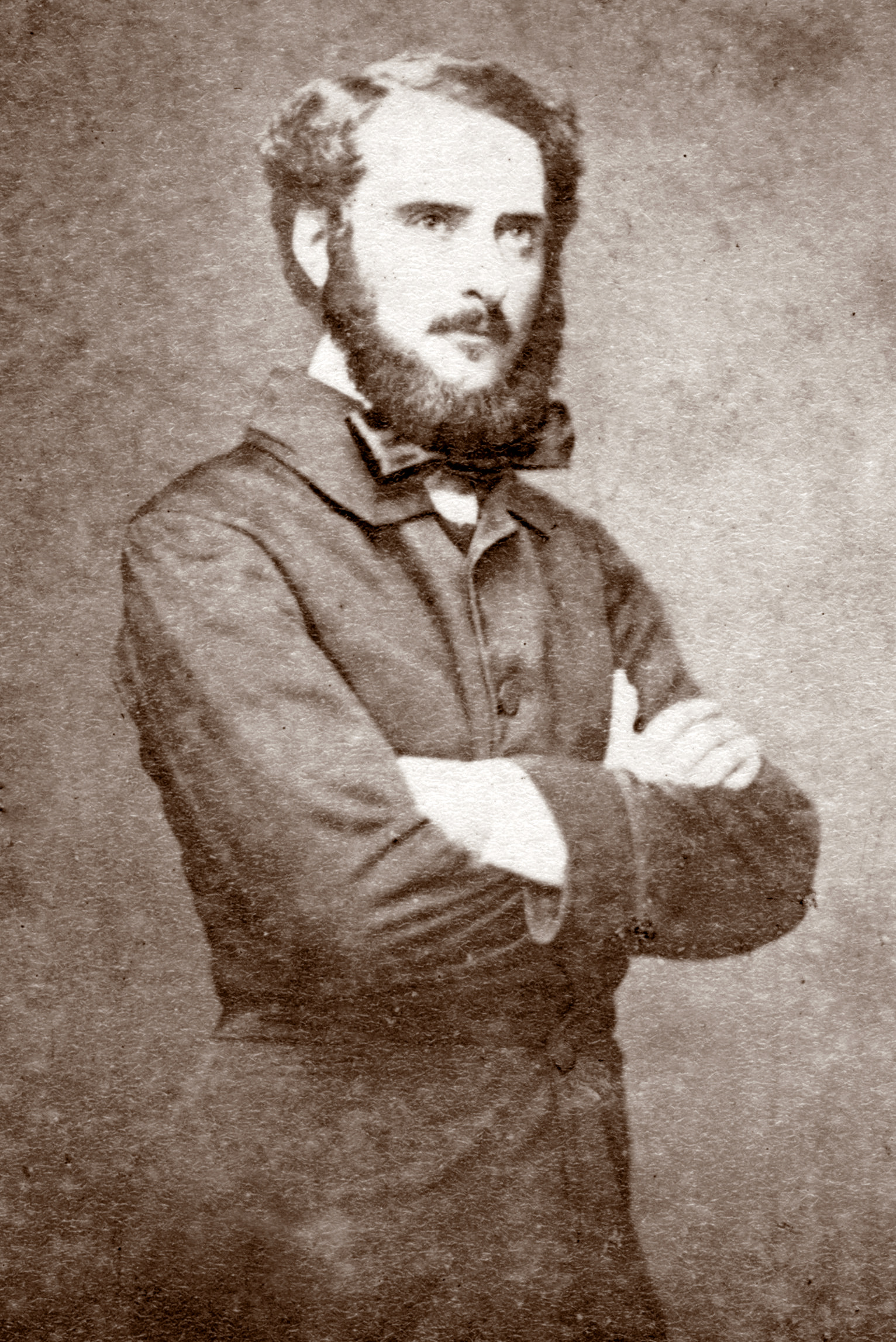
General Charles Frederick Henningsen

== Battle ==
Walker’s men assaulted the town, this time supported by constant fire from the artillery commanded by General Henningsen. Just as had happened during the battle at Masaya in October, Walker’s men quickly captured the small plaza of San Sebastian, but after vicious fighting, were halted mere yards from the city’s central plaza. By this point, one third of Walker’s command had been killed or wounded, and inconclusive fighting raged for the next two days. By midnight of the 17th, Walker had concluded that not only had losses been too costly in the assault, but that too much valuable time had been lost. Walker and his men thus lifted the siege and quietly retired back to Granada.

== Aftermath ==
Walker and his remaining 200 men were able to return unmolested back to Granada, presumably because the Central American forces had also taken serious losses and were in no position to pursue Walker’s army. It was after this costly battle that Walker made the decision to abandon and destroy Granada, relating to Henningsen his intentions after re-entering the city on the 18th.
