= First Battle of Masaya =

1856 battle in Nicaragua

- Part of the Filibuster War
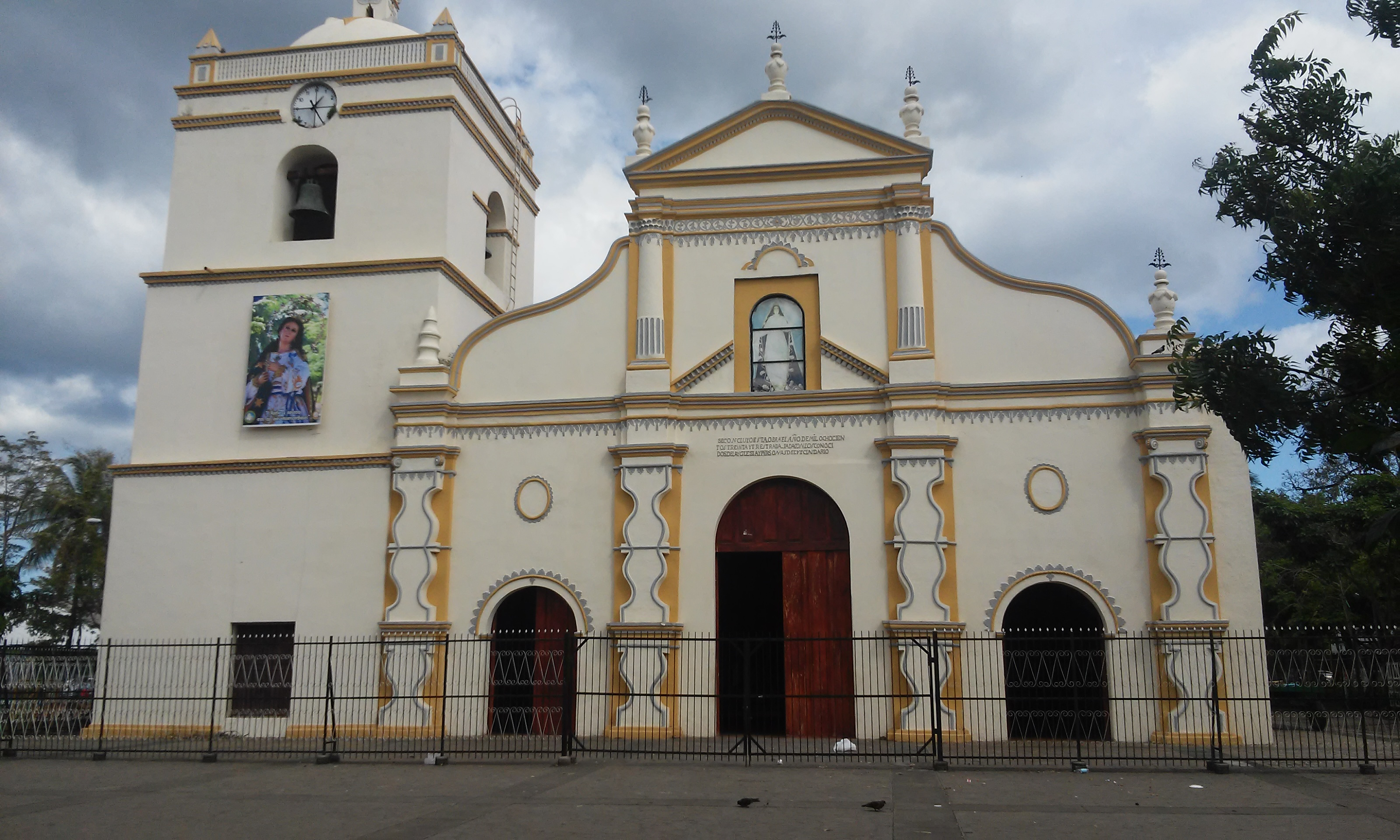
- The church located in the Central Park of the City of Masaya
Date	11–13 October, 1856
Location	Masaya, Nicaragua
Result	Inconclusive; Filibusters repulsed

Belligerents
Filibusters	Allied Central American Army (Ejército Aliado Centroamericano): Nicaragua; Costa Rica; Honduras; Guatemala; El Salvador

Commanders and leaders
William Walker	Ramón Belloso

Strength
800 Filibusters	1,300 Central American Troops

Casualties and losses
Unknown, 109–110 casualties in Masaya and Granada on October 12 and 13 (24–25 dead, 76–85 wounded and 9 missing)	Unknown, 32 casualties only on October 12 (11 dead and 21 wounded)

The First Battle of Masaya (11 October 1856 – 13 October 1856) took place in the small town of Masaya, northwest of William Walker’s filibuster capital, Granada. It was part of Walker’s efforts to dislodge the resurgent Allied Central American Army from its fortifications in Masaya, which lay within a day’s march of his capital. After significant initial filibuster advances were made, Walker’s army was forced to retreat towards Granada after receiving notice that the city was under attack.

== Background ==
Following the defeat of the Filibusters at the Battle of San Jacinto on September 14, the newly emboldened Allied Central American Army began to take up the initiative against Walker’s men. On November 7, Costa Rican troops under Jose Maria Cañas captured the key coastal city of San Juan del Sur. Feeling the pressure, Walker sought to win a decisive victory over the Allied Central American force. The Allied army had been stationed in recently captured Managua up until the 24th of September, when they received the news of the victory at San Jacinto on the 14th. Upon hearing this, Ramon Belloso, the leader of the Allied army, elected to pursue Walker’s army, which had last been spotted near the town of Masaya. On October 2, the Allies occupied Masaya without resistance, realizing that Walker and his men had already fled back to their power base at Granada. Foolishly, Walker had left all of his fortifications in Masaya intact and open for use by the Central Americans. More than a week passed before he attempted to retake Masaya, giving the Allied army time to recover from their long march. As Walker’s army finally began its march towards Masaya from Granada on October 11, it numbered only 800 men, dwarfed in size by the recently reinforced, resupplied, and fortified Allied army of 2,300 men. As Walker’s force approached, bickering broke out in the ranks of the multinational Central American army, resulting in the departure of 1,000 Guatemalan men, under General José Víctor Zavala, from the main army under Belloso. Nonplussed, Belloso ensured that the loyal portion of his still large army remained unperturbed by any small arguments, restoring harmony before Walker’s arrival.

== Battle ==
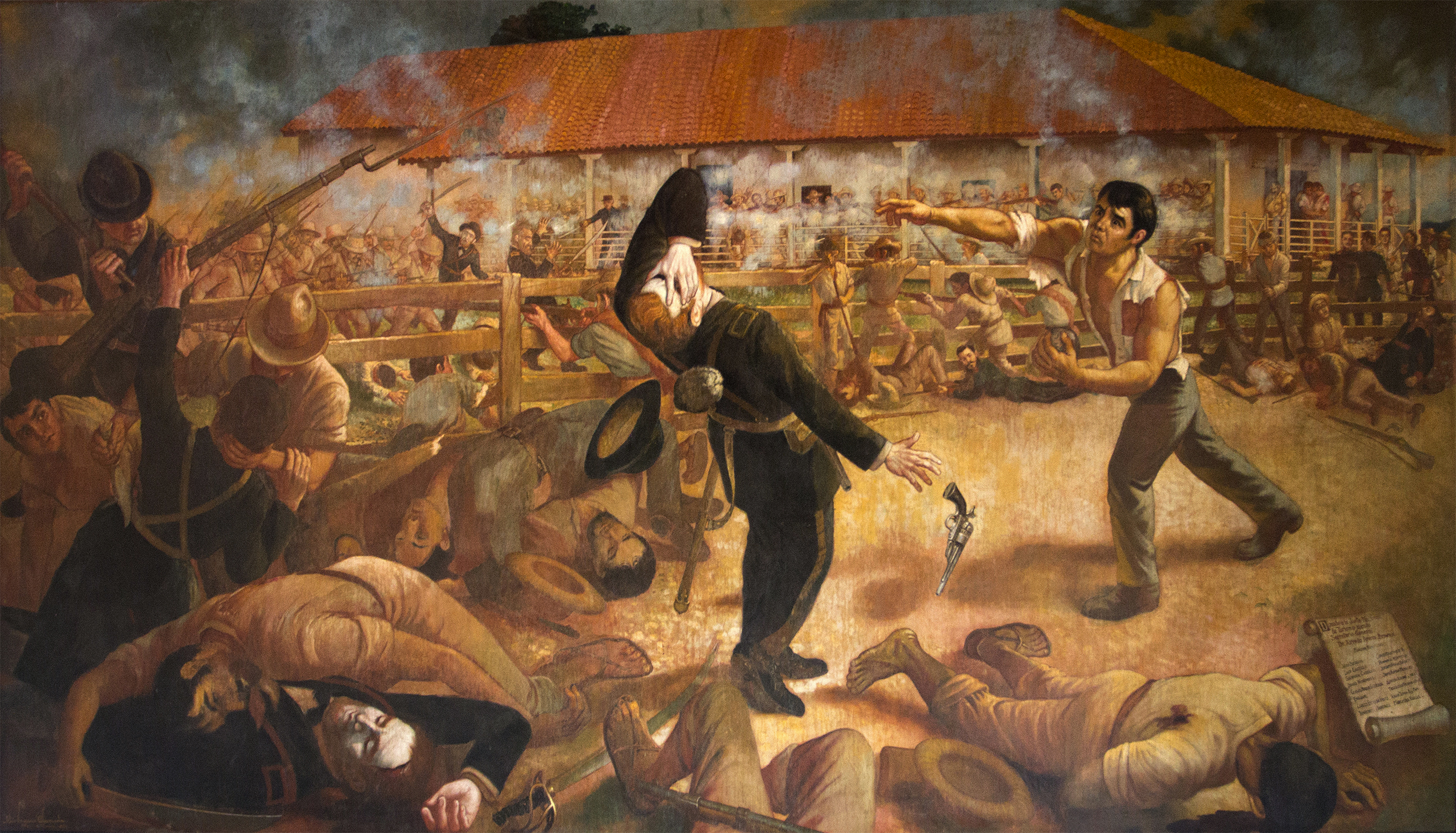
Scene from the Battle of San Jacinto (1856)

Having begun their march in the morning, the 800 men under Walker arrived in Masaya as darkness was beginning to fall on October 11. Instantly taking up the initiative, Walker attacked, winning a small skirmish and capturing the small plaza of San Sebastian. Sporadic fire continued throughout the night, and by dawn on the 12th, the filibusters, led by their two howitzers under the command of a certain Captain Schwartz, had pushed the city’s defenders all the way back to the main plaza. Positioned in adobe houses surrounding the plaza, Walker’s small force of men found it impossible to capture the plaza itself despite having the Allied Central Americans on the back foot, and inconclusive fighting was carried out throughout the rest of the day and into the night. That midnight, a courier arrived from Granada with the shocking news that the Guatemalan force under Zavala which had earlier detached from Belloso’s army was now beginning to approach Walker’s capital, Granada. Defended by a mere 250 men, Walker knew that the rescue of his vulnerable capital would have to take priority over the current engagement at Masaya, and thus ordered the siege of the plaza lifted. Early in the morning on the 13th, Walker and his force retreated to the southeast, ending the battle.

== Aftermath ==
Walker’s speed in returning to Granada after the failure at Masaya shocked the Guatemalans who had so recently taken the city, and Walker quickly retook his capital, with his men brutally gunning down helpless soldiers of Zavala’s force as an act of revenge in response to their initial capture of the filibuster capital. In Masaya and Granada, Walker had lost over 100 men, with Allied losses being similarly heavy. Denied the opportunity to repel a large Central American force from so near his capital, Walker would soon again attempt to retake Masaya, only to be met with similarly frustrating results.
