= Battle of La Virgen =

1855 battle in La Virgen, Nicaragua

- Part of the Filibuster War
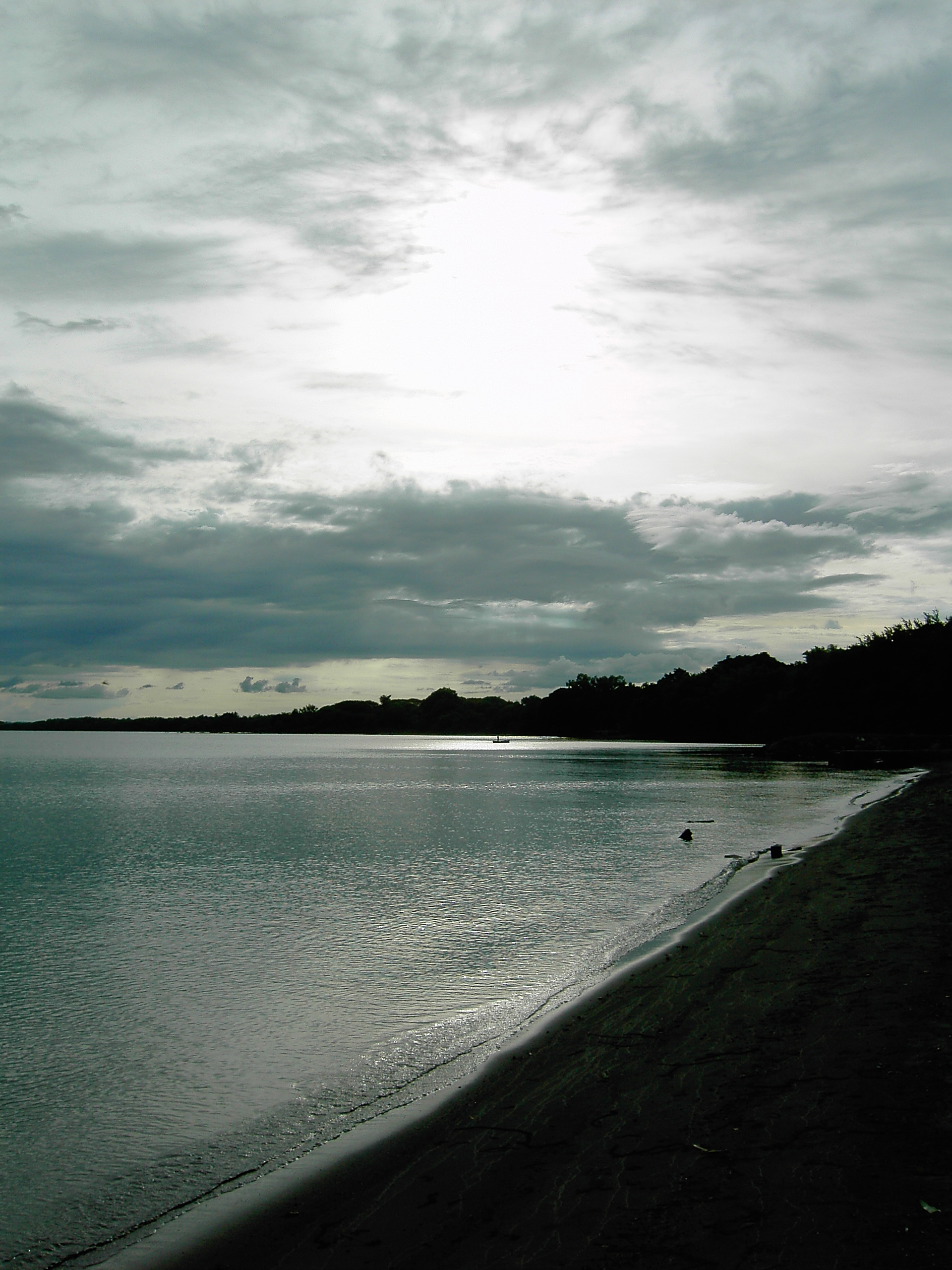
- Shore of Lake Nicaragua
Date	3 September 1855
Location	La Virgen, Nicaragua
Result	Democratic victory

Belligerents
Democratic Party; American filibusters	Legitimist Party

Commanders and leaders
William Walker	José Santos Guardiola

Strength
50 Filibusters; 120 Democrats	600–700

Casualties and losses
At least 2 killed	60 killed

The Battle of La Virgen occurred on 3 September 1855, at La Virgen, Nicaragua. It was part of the Legitimist efforts to resist the newly arrived force of William Walker, who had the support of the fierce opponents of the Legitimists, the Democrats. After a hard-fought but one-sided skirmish, Walker's forces emerged victorious, giving the cause of the invading Filibuster army legitimacy, and inspiring many new volunteers to join his force.

== Background ==
Taking advantage of the conflict between the Nicaraguan Legitimists and Democrats that had erupted in 1854, William Walker and his Falange (phalanx), a force initially made up of 60 filibusters, arrived in Nicaragua under the guise of aiding the Democrats in their fight against the Legitimists. Walker quickly attacked the city of Rivas, and after being driven off by Legitimist troops, he withdrew down the coast of Lake Nicaragua, in the direction of the small town of La Virgen.

== Battle ==
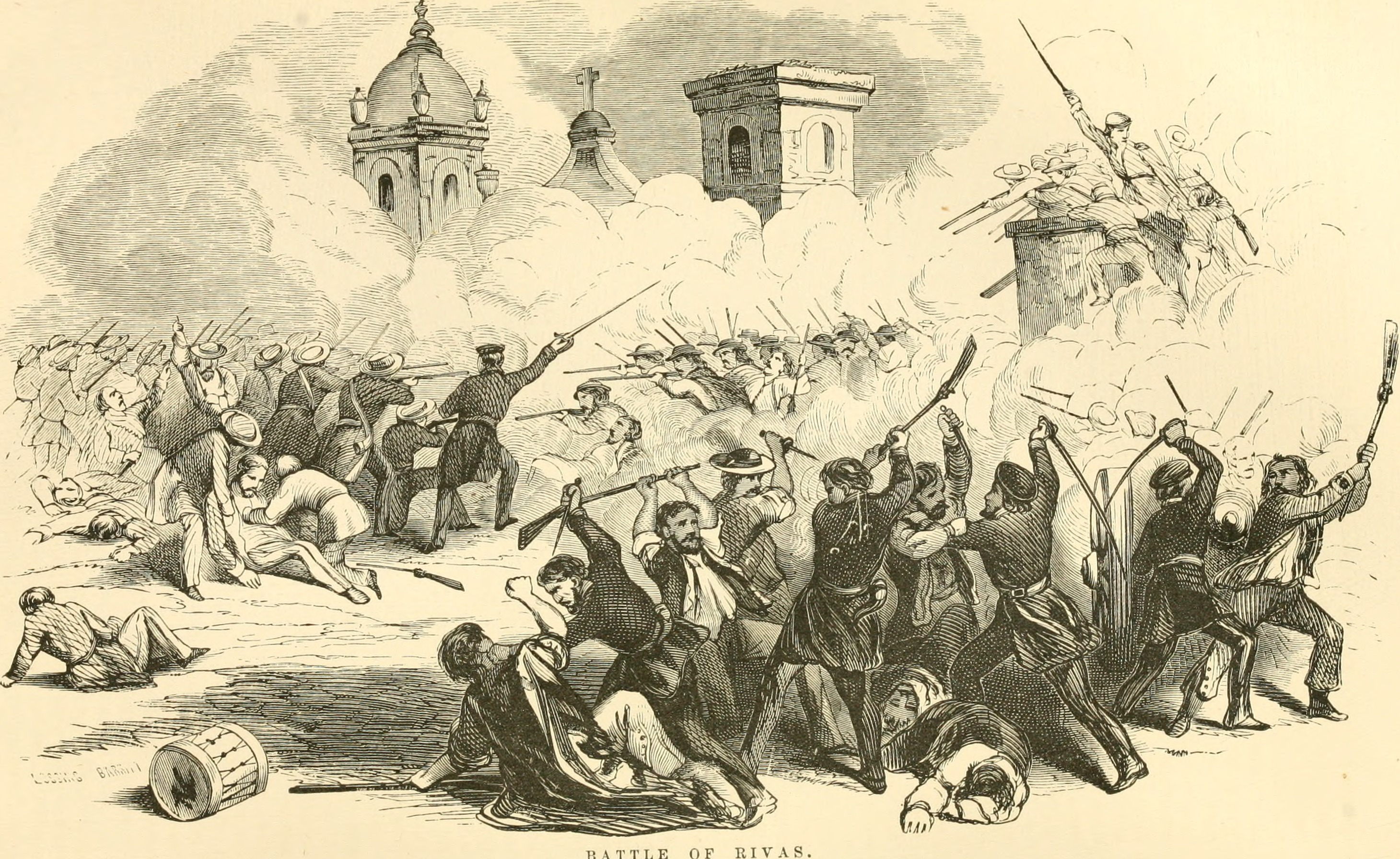
Walker's Phalanx in action at Rivas

During the night of the 2nd, Walker had force marched his men down the transit route that led to La Virgen, arriving late that night.

Having been defeated earlier by the Democrats under General Trinidad Muñoz in the North, the fearsome general José Santos Guardiola (the Butcher), a native of Honduras, was determined to exact his vengeance on Walker and his men. Confident in the superiority of his numbers, Guardiola stated that he would, "drive the Filibusters into the lake and drown them and save his ammunition".

While Walker's men were preparing breakfast on the 3rd, Guardiola struck, his men pouring into the streets of the city. With the lake at their backs and no hope of retreat, Walker's men and their native allies fought vigorously, with Walker, who usually disapproved of the fighting spirit of the natives, even later giving them praise for their efforts. Nicaraguan and American fought literally shoulder to shoulder in the streets of the city, and at one point, the health of Walker even came into question after he was grazed in the throat by a stray bullet. Moments later, another bullet smashed into his coat pocket, but being filled with a package of letters, his life was saved.

Walker's men mounted charge after charge against the weakening Legitimists, and after some time, the section of Guardiola's men directly across from Walker's position in the city began to flee. Instead of completely chasing them off, Walker brought his men to the aid of his native subordinates, perhaps lending credibility to the claims of his growing appreciation of his ally's fighting abilities. A troublesome column of Legitimists, led by a certain Colonel Bosque, had troubled Walker before at Rivas, and were now putting Walker's native allies under immense pressure. Walker quickly had the opposing leader shot off of his signature white horse. Thus, the final Legitimist column was routed, and Guardiola barely escaped back to Rivas with his life.

== Aftermath ==
The battle was instantly regarded as a smashing victory for the Democrats, with only two native Democratic troops found dead in the aftermath. Sixty dead Legitimists were discovered, a figure alone outnumbering Walker's entire Filibuster force. Walker captured all of Guardiola's abandoned artillery, as well as over 150 discarded Legitimist small arms. Walker dealt mercifully with the captured Legitimist prisoners, refusing to run them through with bayonets, as was the Nicaraguan custom. News of the Democratic victory reached the city of Leon, and many eager young recruits from the countryside quickly swelled Walker's ranks as he marched back to San Juan del Sur.

== See also ==
- Monroe Doctrine
- Manifest Destiny, American expansionist movement
- Filibuster War
