= Charles Frederick Henningsen =

Belgian-American writer, mercenary, filibuster, and munitions expert

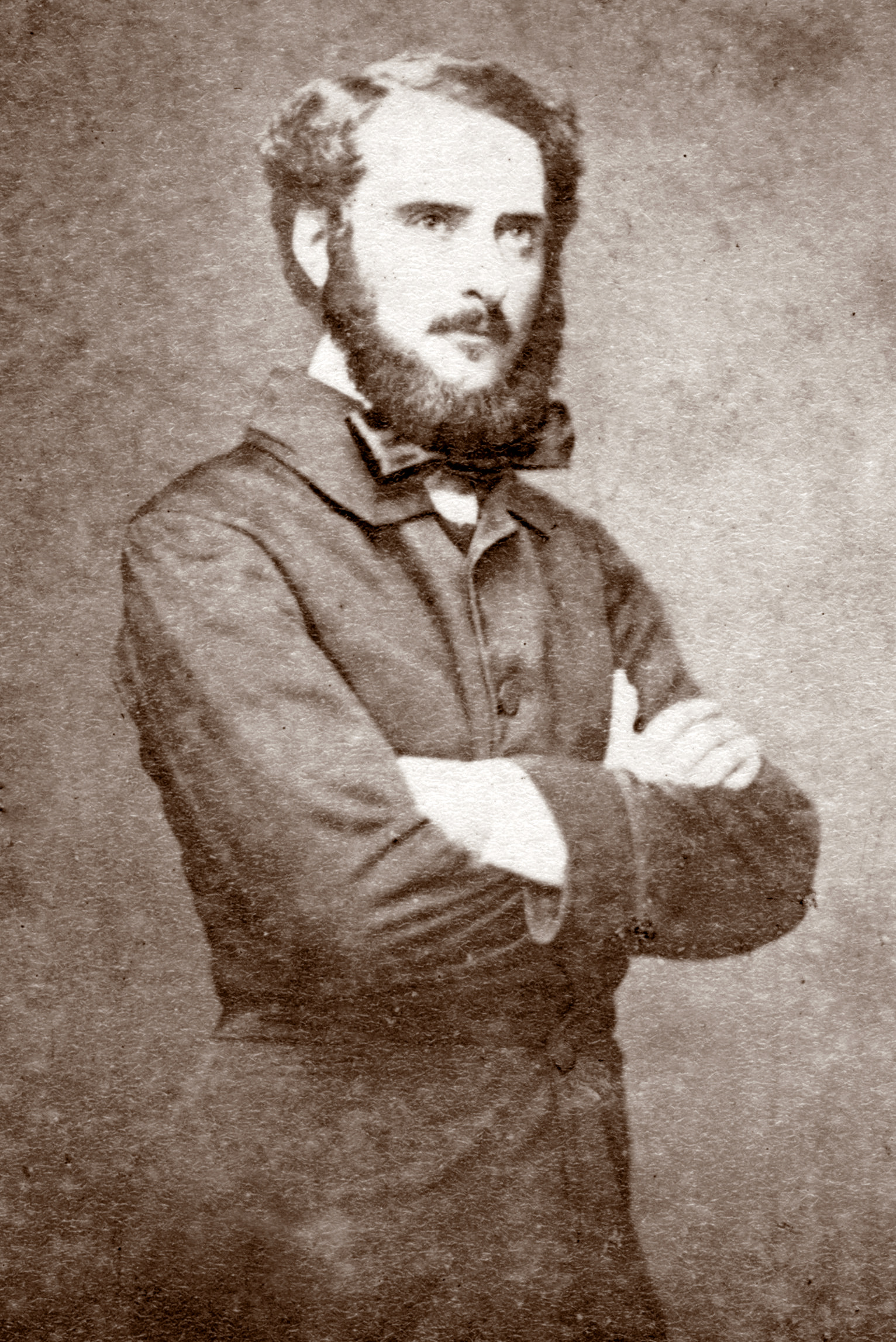
- Born: 21 February 1815; Brussels, Belgium
- Died: 14 June 1877 (aged 62); Washington, D.C., United States
- Military career
- Allegiance: Carlists; Circassia; Hungarian State; Nicaragua (under William Walker); Confederate States
- Conflicts: First Carlist War; Battle of Villar de los Navarros; Hungarian Revolution; Filibuster War; Second Battle of Rivas; Second Battle of Masaya; Siege of Granada; American Civil War; Russo-Circassian War

Charles Frederick Henningsen (21 February 1815 – 14 June 1877) was a Belgian-American writer, mercenary, filibuster, and munitions expert. He participated in revolutions and civil wars in Spain, Circassia, Hungary, Nicaragua, and the United States.

== Early life ==
Henningsen was born in Brussels. His father was John Henningsen (1775–1859), a native of Copenhagen, Denmark, and his mother was Louisa Burke (1789–1842), an Irish heiress. However, being adventurous in his youth, he revered Lord Byron in both literature and adventure, and so idealized British nobility in his actions. The family lived in Brussels from at least the time of his birth until the onset of the Belgian Revolution, fleeing due to their pro-Dutch sympathies. The family fled first to Paris, then to London. One of his sisters was Josephine Amelie de Henningsen (1822–1904), a member of the Missionary Sisters of the Assumption, who established the order in South Africa in 1849.

== Spain ==
He fought in the First Carlist War, after entering as a volunteer in the service of Don Carlos in 1834. Henningsen rose to be captain of bodyguard to the Carlist general Tomás de Zumalacárregui. After the signing of the Lord Eliot Convention in April 1835, at which he was present, Henningsen returned to England.

However, Henningsen soon returned to Spain with the rank of lieutenant-colonel and joined the Carlist expedition that threatened Madrid from Aragon.

He fought at the Battle of Villar de los Navarros (24 August 1837), a Carlist victory, earning the rank of colonel. He headed the Carlist lancers and was attacked outside of Madrid by Liberal (Isabeline) forces. He led a column against these forces, capturing the outer fortifications of Madrid. He held them for several hours, until notified that Don Carlos could send him no reinforcements.

However, he was subsequently taken prisoner, and released on parole. He did not serve again in this war. He later recorded his experiences in Spain in the book The Most Striking Events of a Twelvemonth's Campaign with Zumalacarregui, which he dedicated to Lord Eliot. The work created controversy in Britain because it glorified Zumalacárregui and supported the Carlist position.

== Russia and Hungary ==
Henningsen subsequently fought against the Russian army in Circassia during the Russian-Circassian War, and wrote up a military report on Russia, also later writing the book Revelations of Russia. This was translated into French by Cyprien Robert and published in Paris (3 vols. 1845).

He then became involved in the revolution in Hungary led by Lajos Kossuth, and was also involved in the planning of the military campaign against enemy Austrian forces.

He proposed a military plan of campaign that was well received by Richard Debaufre Guyon and other leaders; as a result, Henningsen was to be appointed military and civil commander of the fortress of Komárom (Komorn). However, the Hungarian Revolution was suppressed, and Henningsen later visited Kossuth at Kütahya in 1850, where the Hungarian leader had been detained.

He then traveled from Constantinople to Albania, and then crossed the Adriatic Sea to Italy.

== Nicaragua ==
In 1852, Henningsen travelled to the United States shortly after Kossuth arrived in that country. He remained in the United States as a representative of Hungarian interests. He served under William Walker in Nicaragua from October 1856, and was appointed major-general, commanding Walker's artillery.

He was responsible for burning Granada, at that time the capital of Nicaragua, during the early hours of November 23, 1856. During this incident, he was in Granada with 419 men under orders from Walker to set the city on fire. The next day he was surrounded by some 2,800 Central American troops, fighting his way to Lake Nicaragua for twenty two days with a loss of 272 killed, wounded, deserters, and captured. Nothing of the city was left but a smoking ruin; when he withdrew, he left an inscription on a lance reading, in Spanish, Aquí fue Granada ("Here was Granada").

At the lake, he was joined by a reinforcement of 170 men, and escaped by breaking the siege of the allied Central American forces.

On 1 May 1857 Henningsen, along with Walker, surrendered to Commander Charles Henry Davis of the United States Navy and was repatriated.

== United States ==
He became a citizen of the United States and was married to a niece of John M. Berrien, U.S. Senator from Georgia and the granddaughter of Major John Berrien. Henningsen continued to pursue filibuster schemes and fought in the American Civil War for the Confederacy for a year, being made colonel (while still addressed as "General"), and frequently had command of the defenses of Richmond. He was involved in the Battle of Elizabeth City. His wife, Wilhelmina "Willy" (Belt) Henningsen (1820-1880) opened and operated a hospital (the Henningsen Hospital) in Richmond until 1863, when its operations were consolidated with the Louisiana Hospital. She was noted for the kindness and tenderness to the wounded and afflicted soldiers. After the war he took up his residence in Washington, D.C., and was involved in the movement to liberate Cuba from Spanish rule. During his declining years, he lived in straitened circumstances, but was supported by friends such as Colonel Albert Pike.

== Death ==
His 1877 obituary in The Evening Star described him as a "man of striking appearance, being tall, erect, and soldier-like in his bearing. He was gentleman of scholarly attainments, and spoke the French, Spanish, Russian, German, and Italian languages with the fluency of a native." Another source states that "he died in 1877 without ever winning any of the causes for which he fought."

He is mentioned in Ernesto Cardenal's poem Con Walker en Nicaragua ("With Walker in Nicaragua"):

And then came that Englishman, C. F. Henningsen,
who'd fought against the Czar and in Spain and for the independence of Hungary.

== Writings and munitions expertise ==
Henningsen's specialty was artillery, but he also wrote about the improvement of small arms, and superintended the development of the first Minié rifles in the United States.

His works include:

- The Last of the Sophias: A Poem (London, 1831)
- Scenes from the Belgian Revolution (London, 1832)
- The Siege of Missalonghi (London, 1832)
- The Most Striking Events of a Twelvemonth's Campaign with Zumalacarregui in Navarre and the Basque Provinces, 2 vols. (London: John Murray, 1836) – translated into Spanish, German, and French
- "St. Petersburg and Its Inhabitants", The New Monthly Magazine and Humorist, vol. 69 (October 1843): 241-59
- "The Emperor Nicholas, His Nobles, Serfs, and Servants", The New Monthly Magazine, vol. 70 (April 1844): 477-93
- "The Emperor Nicholas, His Nobles, Serfs, and Servants" (concluded), The New Monthly Magazine, vol. 71 (June 1844): 216-31
- Revelations of Russia: or the Emperor Nicholas and His Empire in 1844. By one who has seen and describes., 2 vols. (London: Henry Colburn, 1844) – translated into French and German
- The White Slave; or, The Russian Peasant Girl. By the author of "Revelations of Russia." 3 Vols. (Henry Colburn, 1845)
- Revelations of Russia in 1846. By an English resident. Third edition, 2 vols. (Henry Colburn, 1846) – translated into German
- Eastern Europe and The Emperor Nicholas. By the author of "Revelations of Russia;" "The White Slave." 3 Vols. (London: T.C. Newby, 1846) – also translated into German
- Sixty Years Hence: A Novel. By the author of "The White Slave," etc., 3 vols. (T.C. Newby, 1847)
- Analogies and Contrasts; or, Comparative Sketches of France and England. By the author of "Revelations of Russia." (London, 1848)
- The National Defenses. By the author of "The Revelations of Russia," etc. (T.C. Newby, 1848)
- Kossuth and "The Times". By the author of "The Revelations of Russia" (London, 1851)
- The Past and Future of Hungary, by C.F. Henningsen, Secretary to Governor Louis Kossuth, author of "Twelve Months' Campaign with Zumalacarregui," "Revelations of Russia," "Eastern Europe," etc. (Cincinnati: E. Morgan, 1852)
