= Ramón Belloso =

Salvadoran soldier

General Ramón Belloso
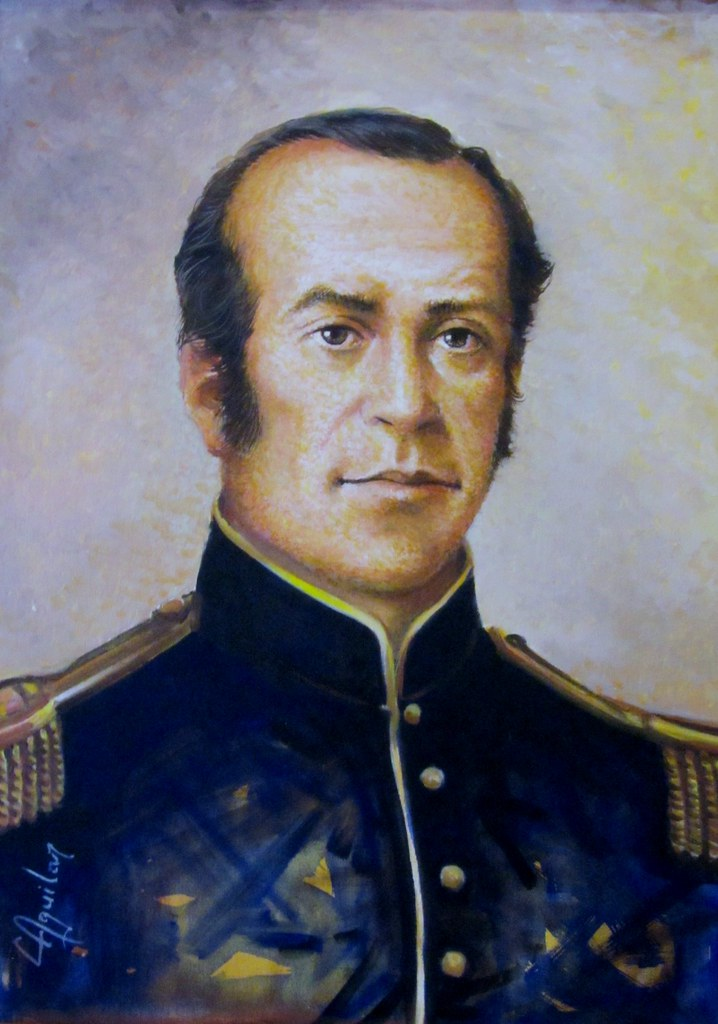
- Born: 1810; San Salvador, New Spain
- Died: 27 June 1858 (aged 47–48) San Salvador, El Salvador
- Allegiance: El Salvador
- Service years: ?–1857
- Rank: General
- Conflicts: Malespín's War; Battle of Monte San Juan; Siege of León; War of 1851; Battle of La Arada; Filibuster War; Battle of Masaya; Siege of Granada

Ramón Belloso (1810 – 27 June 1858) was a Salvadoran military officer born in San Salvador who helped expel the filibuster William Walker from Nicaragua.

In the presence of William Walker in Nicaragua, on June 25, 1856, the supreme head of El Salvador made a proclamation where he declared war on the invader:

No Central American who has feelings of patriotism can remain a cold spectator of such a scandalous attack, and the government of El Salvador is no longer only ready to powerfully assist the Government and people of Nicaragua, but to raise its protest and voice before the civilized nations of Europe and America... To arms: the Homeland orders us to fight as good and loyal children of its own...".

As a representative of the Salvadoran government forces, Belloso arrived in León among expressions of sympathy on July 12. On the 18th, El Salvador, Honduras and Guatemala jointly declared war on the illegitimate 'government' of the usurper Walker. Patricio Rivas, recognized as the legitimate President of Nicaragua, appointed Belloso General-in-Chief of the allied forces on the 27th of that same month; despite this, there were signs of disagreement by the Guatemalan military delegate. However, Belloso filed his offices so that local political rivals reached an agreement to fight against the filibuster.

Gradually the allied forces advanced over the territory: after taking Managua (September 24) they passed to Masaya (October 2) without the filibusters presenting resistance. These withdrew to Granada and attempted a failed attack on the allies. Another attempt was made on November 15 with no results. At that time, a plague of cholera spread in Central America.

Subsequently, the Costa Rican troops were placed under the command of Belloso on November 7; the filibusters, already in a demoralized state, destroyed Granada on the 20th of that month reducing it to ruins. Belloso attacked on the 24th and his troops evicted the filibusters three days later. However, he faced new internal disputes of the political factions and new disobedience to his command. The conflict continued with Walker's factions resisting until he was finally captured by U.S. forces and taken prisoner to the United States (December 12, 1857). On March 16, 1857, Belloso was received with samples of joy in Cojutepeque. The following month he was sent to make an inventory of the troops in Nicaragua. Gerardo Barrios was for that time head of the Salvadoran army in that same country. Once Belloso arrived to fulfill his mission, he learned of Barrios' intentions to overthrow the then-president Rafael Campo. Belloso refused and left back for El Salvador to report on Barrios' plans. On the other hand, the soldiers who returned with this soldier from Nicaragua spread cholera in the country. The Salvadoran president along with Belloso prepared to face the Barrios rebellion, but in the end he declined his claims. On June 16, 1857, Belloso was granted the withdrawal from active service in recognition of his military campaigns and loyalty to the government. At the same time, cholera disease was rising in the country, taking victims from all social strata, including Belloso who died on June 27.
