= Battle of San Juan del Sur =

Naval action

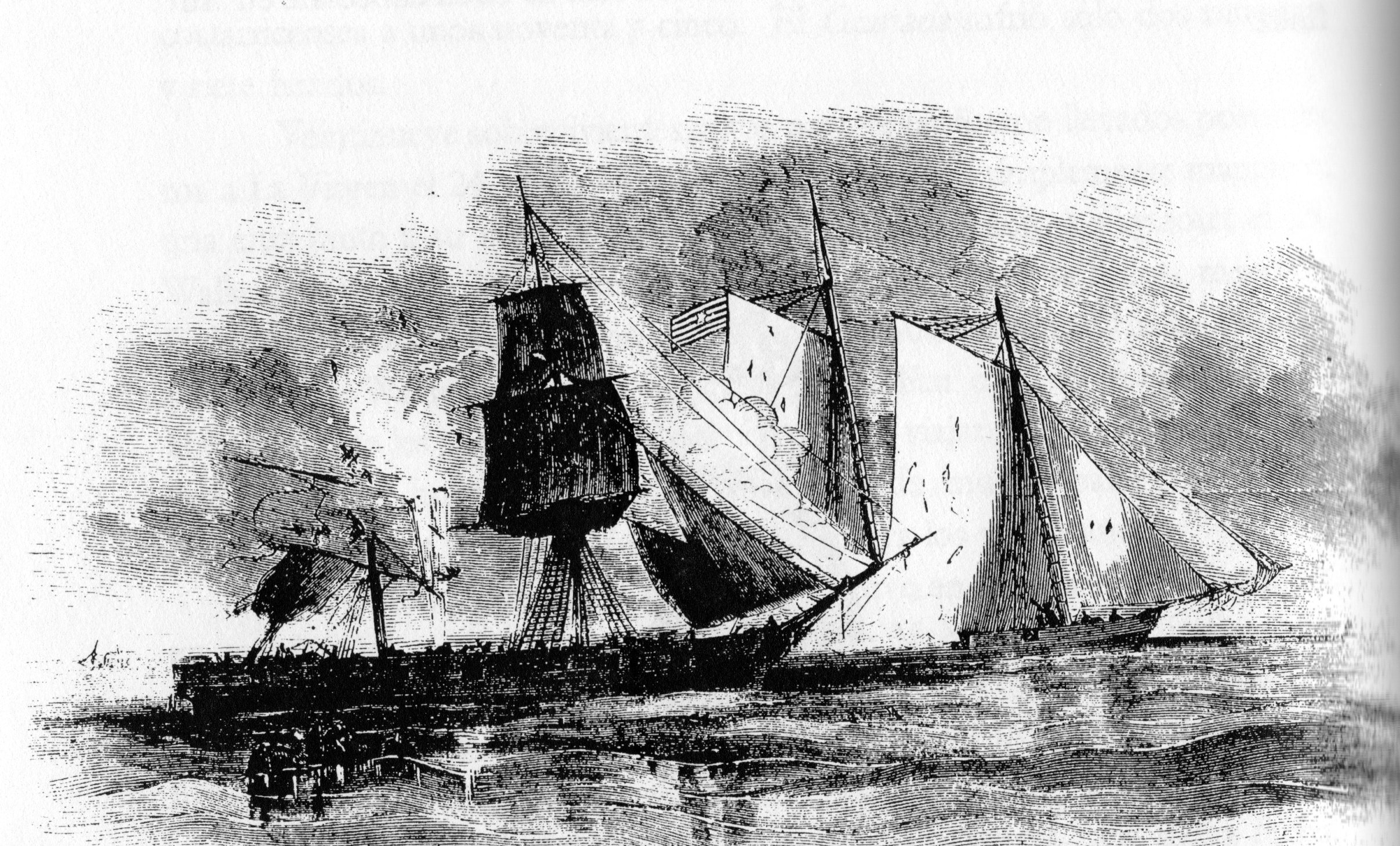
- Part of the Filibuster War
Date	23 November 1856
Location	Off San Juan del Sur, Nicaragua
Result	Filibuster victory

Belligerents
Filibusters	Costa Rica

Commanders and leaders
Callender I. Fayssoux	(Costa Rica) Antonio Villarostra †

Strength
1 schooner, 28 men, 2 six pound carronades	1 brig, 114 men, 4 nine pounders

Casualties and losses
1 killed, 8 wounded	1 brig, 74 killed

The Battle of San Juan del Sur was a minor naval engagement during the Filibuster War between the Nicaraguan (Filibusters) schooner Granada and the Costa Rican brig Once de Abril, which took place off San Juan del Sur, Nicaragua.

== Background ==
On 21 November 1856, two days before the engagement, Walker ordered the destruction of Granada, his capital, to keep the city out of enemy hands, and fell back and fortified himself at Rivas. His situation deteriorating, he planned to escape, if need be, by fighting his way out of Rivas to the port of San Juan del Sur, where he could rendezvous with his navy––the schooner Granada––and return to California.

The filibusters captured the schooner Granada––formerly the San José––from the Costa Ricans at San Juan del Sur in the summer of 1856, and converted the ship for war. The Costa Rican brig Once de Abril was named in honor of their victory over the filibusters at the Second Battle of Rivas, seven months earlier.

== Battle ==
At 4pm, Lieutenant Callender Fayssoux spotted a sail coming down the coast and immediately put his vessel under sail. By 6pm, the Granada was close enough to the vessel to see it flying Costa Rican colors, as it was the brig Once de Abril, and shortly thereafter Captain Villarostra opened fire on the filibuster schooner with round shot, grapeshot, and musketry, the Granada immediately returning fire. The engagement continued for two hours, the ships closing to within one hundred yards of one another, until, at around 8pm, a shot from Granada hit the magazine aboard Once de Abril, causing part of the brig to blow up and set afire. By 9pm the Once de Abril had extinguished the flames, but damaged caused by the explosion had her taking on water. Lieutenant Fayssoux brought the Granada alongside and sent a boat to ferry the Costa Rican wounded aboard. Minutes later, the Once de Abril went down by the head, listing to starboard, her sails trapping some of the crew underwater. Only forty of the 114 crew survived, many of whom were badly burned and wounded. The Granada lost one killed, one seriously wounded, and seven lightly wounded.

== Aftermath ==
The engagement was one of the few clear victories of Walker's enterprise in Nicaragua, but by this point in the war had no effect on improving his dire strategic situation. Walker surrendered to the US Navy on 1 May 1857.

Lieutenant Fayysoux was promoted to captain and granted the hacienda Rosario at Rivas.
