= Filibuster War =

1856–57 invasion of Nicaragua by American filibuster William Walker

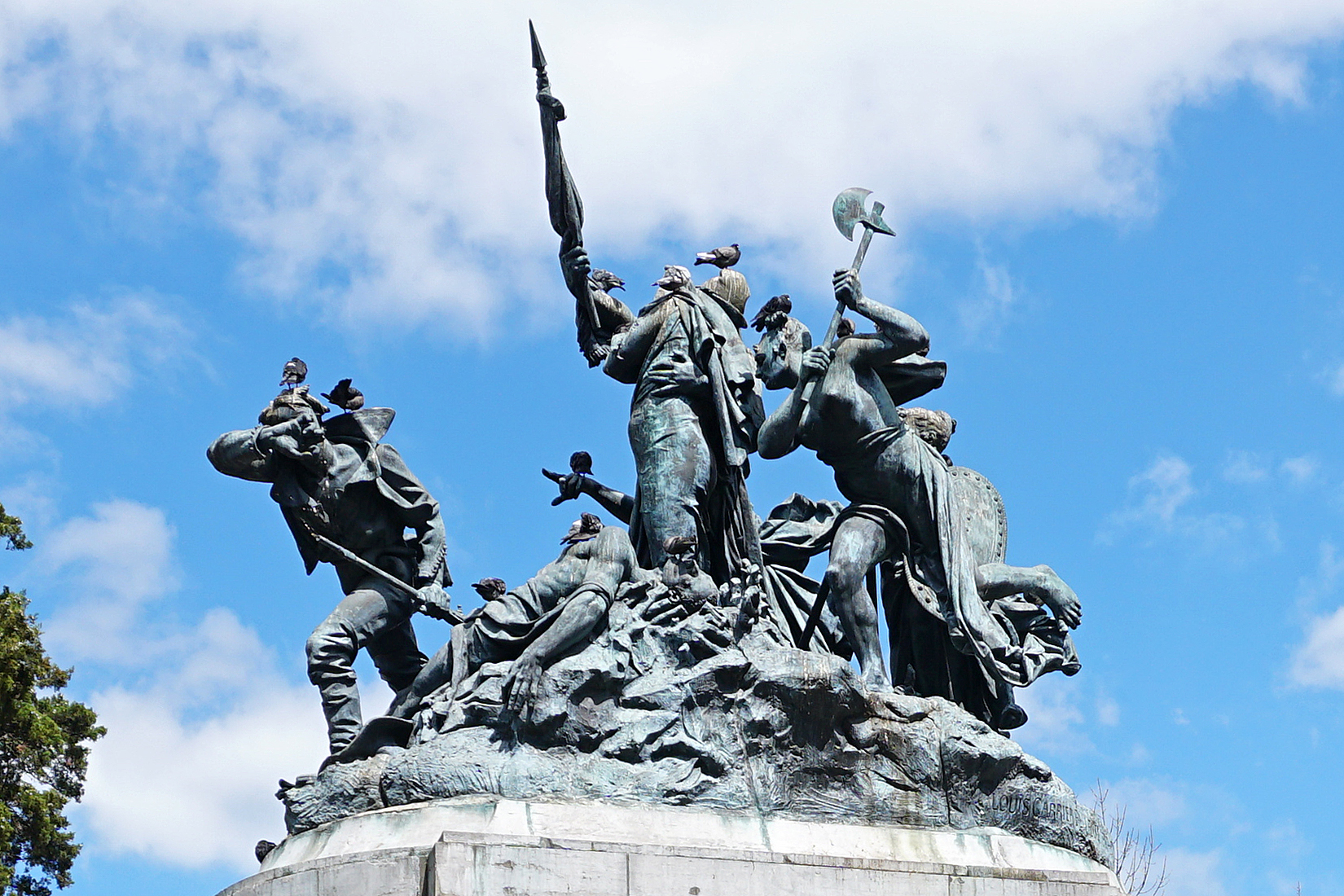
- The National Monument of Costa Rica in San José depicting the countries of Central America triumphing over filibuster William Walker
Date	16 June 1855 – 1 May 1857 (1 year, 10 months, 2 weeks and 1 day)
Location	Nicaragua with spillovers in Costa Rica
Result	Central American alliance victory

Belligerents
Filibusters; Walker's Nicaragua; Democratic Party	Allied Central American Army; Nicaragua; Costa Rica; El Salvador; Guatemala; Honduras; Legitimist Party

Commanders and leaders
William Walker (surrendered); Charles Henningsen; Byron Cole †; Birkett D. Fry; Patricio Rivas; Francisco Castellón #; Nazario Escoto; Ponciano Corral (executed); Trinidad Muñoz †	Tomás Martínez; Máximo Jerez; José María Estrada X; Ponciano Corral; Juan Rafael Mora; José Joaquín Mora; José María Cañas; Ramón Belloso; Gerardo Barrios; Mariano Paredes; Florencio Xatruch; Sylvanus Spencer

Strength
Per Henningsen: 2,518 total	Per Henningsen: 17,800 total; 6,300 (Nicaraguans); 11,500 (allies)

Casualties and losses
Per Henningsen: 1,000 killed in action or died to disease; 80 captured; 700 deserted	Per Henningsen: 5,860 killed or wounded; Unknown died to disease
- 9,615 died to cholera in Costa Rica

The Filibuster War, also referred to the Walker affair and known in Costa Rica as the National Campaign of 1856–1857, (Note: Spanish: Campaña Nacional de 1856–1857) was a war fought in Central America between 1855 and 1857. The militaries of Costa Rica, El Salvador, Guatemala, Honduras, and Nicaragua established the Allied Central American Army and fought against American filibusters led by William Walker who had taken over the Nicaraguan government.

In 1854, the Democratic Party of Nicaragua led by Francisco Castellón launched a rebellion against the Legitimist government of President Fruto Chamorro. During the war, American businessman Byron Cole became acquainted with Castellón and convinced him to invite American filibusters led by Walker to militarily support his faction. Walker's force of 58 men arrived in Nicaragua in June 1855. Walker captured the Legitimist capital of Granada in October 1855 and established a government with Patricio Rivas as its president, however, Walker held the real power.

In March 1856, Costa Rica declared war on Walker's government. Filibusters invaded Costa Rica but were defeated at the Battle of Santa Rosa. Costa Rican president Juan Rafael Mora led a counterattack the following month and defeated the filibusters at the Second Battle of Rivas, but Mora withdrew due to a cholera outbreak among his troops. The governments of El Salvador and Guatemala soon sent soldiers to help overthrow Walker and the filibusters suffered defeats at San Jacinto and Masaya. Walker lost control of Granada, the capital, in December 1856. Walker surrendered to United States Navy commander Charles Henry Davis on 1 May 1857.

Walker attempted two further expeditions to Nicaragua in late 1857 and mid 1860 but both ended in his arrest, the former by the U.S. Navy and the latter by the Royal Navy. Walker was handed over to Honduran authorities and executed in September 1860. Walker's takeover of Nicaragua and U.S. diplomatic support of his government through U.S. minister John H. Wheeler strained Central America–United States relations.

== Background ==
=== William Walker and filibustering ===
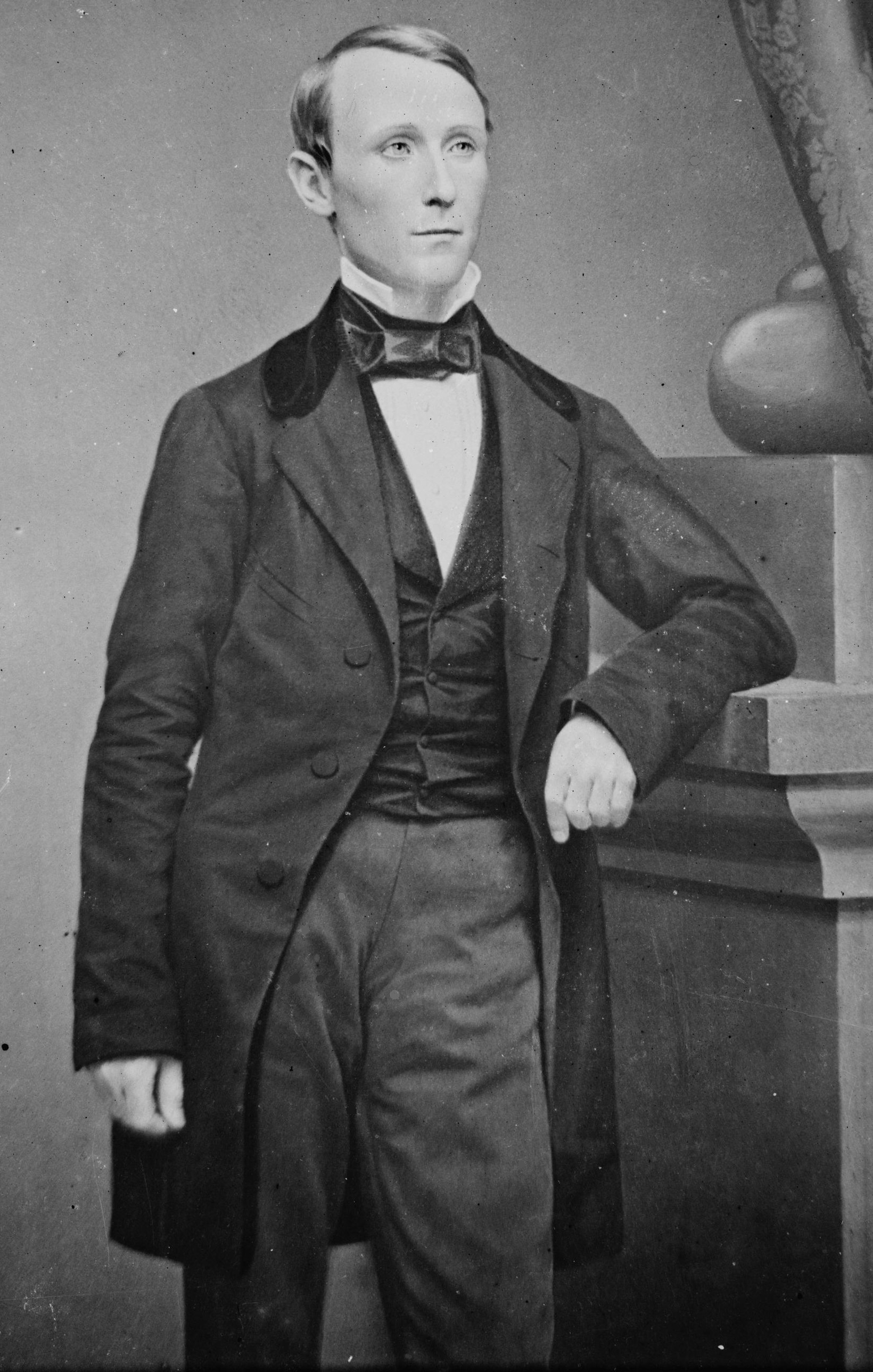
William Walker in c. 1855–1860

William Walker was an American physician, lawyer, and journalist from Tennessee. In 1850, he moved to San Francisco and worked as a newspaper editor. In California, Walker joined a group of Americans who wanted to establish a colony in Sonora, Mexico. When negotiations with the Sonoran government failed, Walker led an invasion force into Mexico in 1853 and proclaimed the establishment of the Republic of Sonora. Part of his justification for the invasion was to supposedly protect Mexican women from Apache attacks.

By 1854, Walker's invasion of Sonora failed and he was forced to flee back to the United States. Walker was tried in San Francisco for violating federal neutrality law but he was found to be not guilty in October 1854. Walker's invasion of Sonora was part of a movement of 1850s American filibustering.

=== Civil war in Nicaragua ===
In April 1854, Nicaraguan president Fruto Chamorro of the Legitimist Party passed a constitutional amendment that increased presidential term lengths from two to four years. The Constituent Assembly subsequently elected him to a second term as President. On 4 May 1854, exiled leaders of the opposition Democratic Party launched a rebellion against Chamorro's government. When the rebels captured the city of León in June, they proclaimed the formation of a provisional government with Francisco Castellón as its leader.

With support from the Honduran government of President José Trinidad Cabañas, the Democrats took control of most of Nicaragua by December 1854. Meanwhile, Chamorro's government continued to control Granada, the country's capital. The Democrats besieged Granada but abandoned the siege in January 1855 due to poor planning. Over the following months, the Legitimists regained control of eastern and central Nicaragua, especially as Cabañas withdrew troops from Nicaragua as he prepared for war with Guatemala. Chamorro died in Granada in March 1855 and was succeeded as president by José María Estrada.

=== Democrats hire filibusters ===
In August 1854, American businessman Byron Cole traveled to Nicaragua to survey the potential profitability of an American business venture in the country. In Nicaragua, Cole became acquainted with politicians of the Democratic Party including Castellón. Castellón sought military support from Cole to help him fight the Legitimists. When Cole returned to the United States, he met with Walker and suggested that he launch a military venture in Nicaragua to take advantage of the country's civil war.

Cole returned to Nicaragua and formed an agreement with Castellón to invite 300 American filibusters to Nicaragua to support the Democratic faction in Nicaragua's civil war in exchange for 21,000 acres (8,500 ha) of land. Walker told Cole to revise the agreement as he believed it violated American neutrality law. The revised agreement gave 52,000 acres (21,000 ha) of land to the filibusters who were officially designated as "colonists". San Francisco district attorney Samuel Williams Inge reviewed the "colonization contract" and determined it did not violate federal neutrality law. Following this, Walker quit his job as a journalist to begin preparations for a military expedition to Nicaragua. Cornelius Garrison and Charles Morgan, two businessman of the Accessory Transit Company, supported Walker's expedition with funding, supplies, and later, reinforcements.

== Course of the conflict ==
=== Walker's invasion of Nicaragua ===
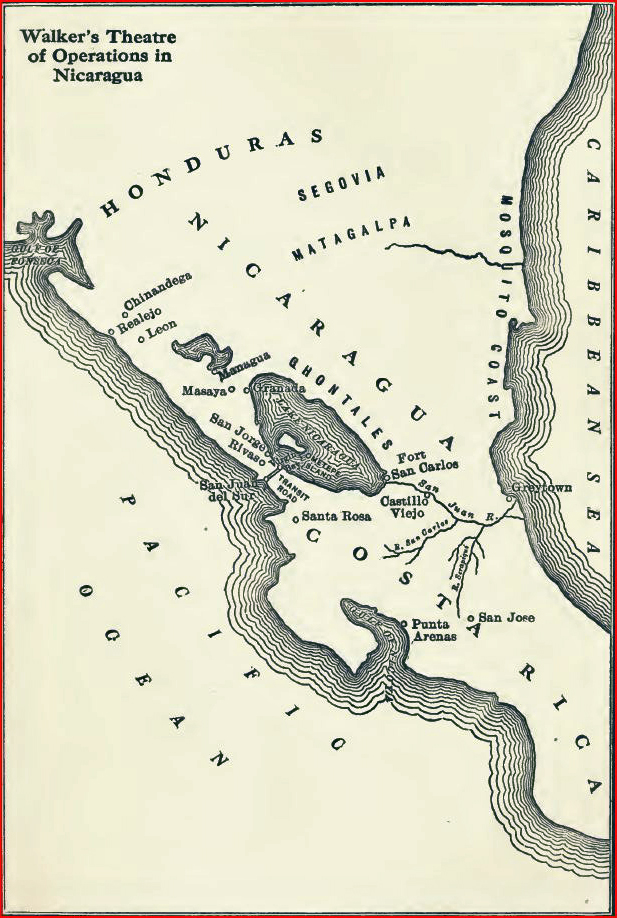
A map of William Walker's theater of operations during the Filibuster War

On 4 May 1855, 58 Americans (including Walker) left the United States aboard the brig Vesta and they landed at El Realejo, Nicaragua on 16 June. Historian Randall O. Hudson referred to this group as the "vanguard" of the 300 filibusters and they were contemporarily referred to as "the Immortals" by American newspapers. Castellón met the Americans and organized them into a unit known as the American Phalanx. On 20 June, Castellón commissioned Walker to lead the American Phalanx with the rank of colonel. Walker divided the American Phalanx into two companies commanded by Lieutenant Colonel Achilles Kewen and Major Timothy Crocker. The phalanx's fighters were naturalized as Nicaraguan citizens.

The American Phalanx, along with 10 Nicaraguan allies, (Note: Castellón promised Walker that the phalanx would be supported by 200 Nicaraguan allies but only 10 arrived. Walker accused Democratic general José Trinidad Muñoz (who opposed Castellón's decision to hire American filibusters) of preventing the full complement of 200 soldiers from being provided.) advanced on the transit road between San Juan del Sur and Virgin Bay (part of Lake Nicaragua) intending to recruit travelers using the road into its ranks. On 29 June, the phalanx attacked the city of Rivas as it lay along the transit road. During the First Battle of Rivas, both Kewen and Crocker were killed and the phalanx was forced to retreat towards San Juan del Sur. At Castellón's request, the American Phalanx moved to León to protect it in case of a Legitimist attack. In August 1855, Democratic forces under General José Trinidad Muñoz defeated the Legitimists at the Battle of El Sauce but Muñoz died shortly afterwards. According to Walker, Muñoz died to wounds sustained in battle, but the Juan Santamaría Historic Cultural Museum of Costa Rica claimed that Walker ordered his assassination. Walker also marched his soldiers back towards the transit road against Castellón's orders to remain in León.

On 3 September 1855, the American Phalanx was attacked by Legitimist soldiers at Virgin Bay. The Battle of La Virgen ended in a victory for the American Phalanx and the transit road came under the phalanx's control. The phalanx returned to San Juan del Sur and enlisted many new recruits in the process. Castellón died of cholera a few days later and was succeeded by Nazario Escoto as the leader of the Democratic Party. On 3 October, the steamer Cortes arrived in Nicaragua from San Francisco and supplied Walker in 35 reinforcements from the Accessory Transit Company.

On 13 October, Walker and the Democrats captured Granada and effectively took control of all of Nicaragua. Walker sought to enter negotiations with the remnants of the Legitimist military led by General Ponciano Corral and to form a coalition government. Corral signed a peace treaty on 23 October. The new government consisted of Patricio Rivas as President of Nicaragua (selected by Walker as he was a neutral politician), Corral as Minister of War, and Walker as Commander-in-Chief of the Nicaraguan Army with the rank of divisional general. Rivas was a puppet ruler; Walker held the real power. John H. Wheeler, the United States minister to Nicaragua, recognized the coalition government two weeks after its formation.

=== Walker's government ===
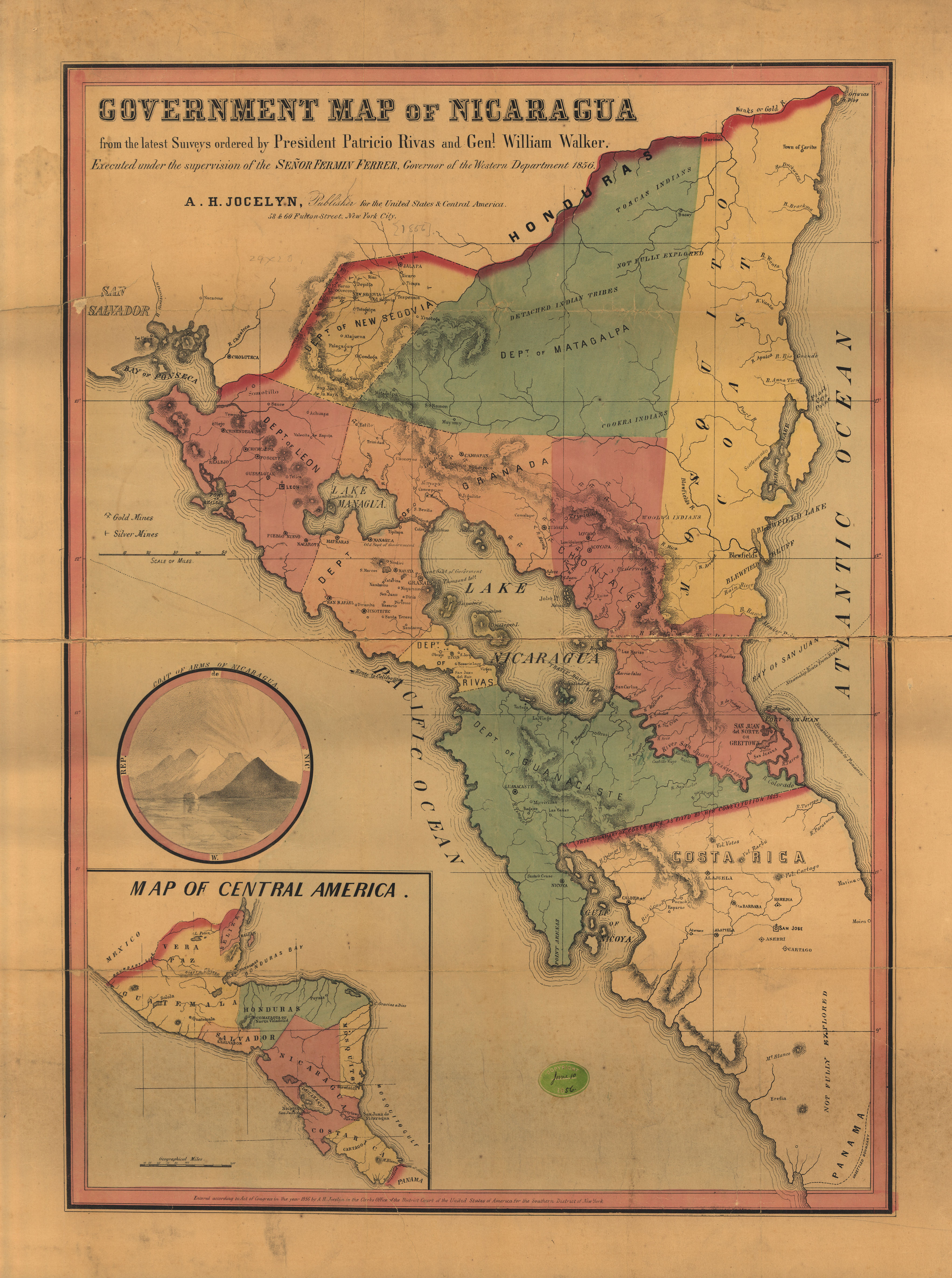
A map of Nicaragua commissioned by Patricio Rivas and William Walker in 1856

Walker sought to encourage Americans to settle in Nicaragua. On 23 November 1855, Rivas offered American settlers 250 acres (100 ha) of land if they moved to Nicaragua or 350 acres (140 ha) if they brought their family with them. Most settlers were men, but some did bring their families with them. Walker legalized slavery as he believed that the practice was necessary to develop Nicaragua's economy. Catholic churches in Nicaragua were attacked by filibusters. Contemporary sources from the Colombian province of Panamá claimed that Walker intended to establish a Protestant church led by Nicaraguan Protestant leader Agustín Vigil. In December 1855, Cabañas, who had been recently deposed as President of Honduras, fled to Nicaragua and asked Walker for support in regaining power. Walker declined to support Cabañas.

Garrison and Walker had been in a power struggle with Cornelius Vanderbilt over control of the Accessory Transit Company. To support Garrison and Walker, on 18 February 1856, Rivas issued a decree that revoked the company's contract in Nicaragua for supposed non-fulfillment of obligations. The company's concessions in Nicaragua were then sold to Garrison and Morgan. Vanderbilt responded by blocking all of the company's ships from traveling to Nicaragua to deprive Walker's government of further support.

According to Wheeler, Walker believed in the concept of manifest destiny. Wheeler added that Walker wanted to bring law-and-order to Nicaragua amidst its civil war and believed that influence from U.S. citizens could accomplish that. According to historian Robert E. May, Walker believed that Americans were racially superior to the darker-skinned inhabitants of Central America. He added that Walker wanted to establish a "personal empire for himself" that would include the other countries of Central America. Walker himself legitimized his invasion in his 1860 autobiography The War in Nicaragua by claiming that Nicaraguan women welcomed his filibusters with "pleasing smiles" and helped bring them supplies throughout the war.

=== Central American intervention ===
The Democrats opposed Rivas' appointment to the presidency and came to oppose the coalition government. Estrada also refused to recognize the coalition government. On 8 November, Corral was executed on Walker's orders for treason. Later that month, Costa Rican president Juan Rafael Mora issued a proclamation warning of the dangers of filibusterism to Central Americans. In February 1856, Mora consulted the Congress of Costa Rica asking it to authorize a war to expel Walker from power in Nicaragua.

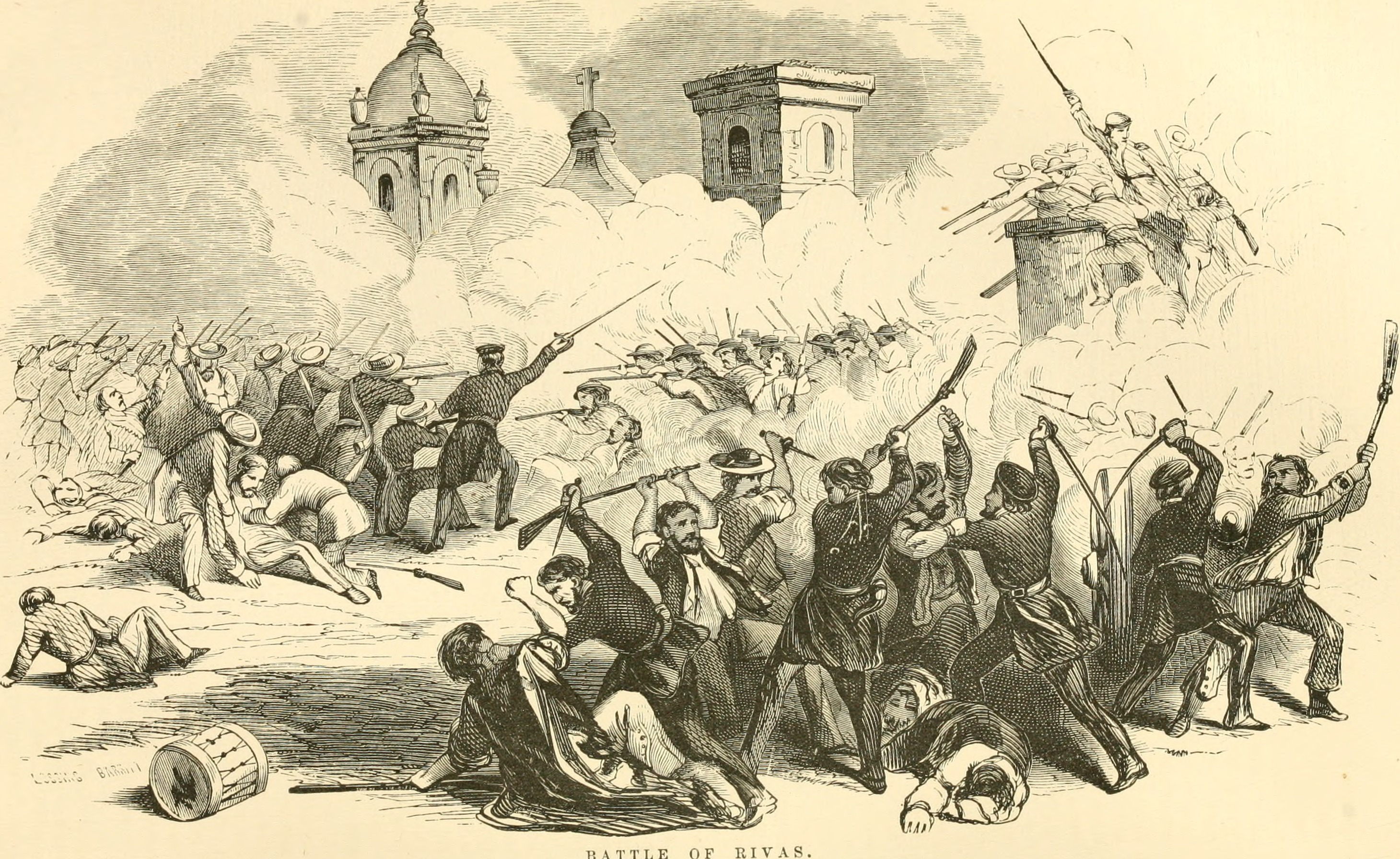
A depiction of the Second Battle of Rivas

On 27 February 1856, Costa Rica declared war on Walker's government. Filibusters led by Colonel Louis Schlessinger responded to the declaration of war by invading Costa Rica, but they were defeated at the Battle of Santa Rosa on 20 March. Mora launched an invasion of Nicaragua and captured Virgin Bay on 7 April, killing several unarmed U.S. citizens in the process. Wheeler protested these killings but found it difficult to condemn the deaths of filibusters as, under U.S. law, they no longer were under Wheeler's protection as they were in violation of federal neutrality law. The Costa Ricans argued that all Americans in Nicaragua were filibusters and subject to execution. Mora's army then advanced on the city of Rivas and defeated Walker's filibusters in the Second Battle of Rivas. Nevertheless, before leaving Rivas, Walker threw his dead men into the wells to poison the water, causing a cholera outbreak. Despite Mora's victory, he withdrew because of the outbreak. This withdrawal lead to a cholera outbreak in Costa Rica that infected 53,000 people and killed 9,615 over the course of ten weeks.

In May 1856, the Guatemalan government dispatched 500 soldiers under the command of General Mariano Paredes to help Costa Rica oust Walker. The following month, the Salvadoran government sent 700 soldiers under the command of General Ramón Belloso. Vanderbilt sent the Central Americans weapons and supplies to help them overthrow Walker. On 11 June, Rivas and many other government officials fled the capital. Walker condemned those who fled and called for an election to elect a new president. Walker won the election in which only his filibuster allies voted. He was inaugurated as President of Nicaragua on 12 July 1856. Shortly afterwards, he issued a decree ordered the confiscation of lands belonging to Nicaraguans who opposed his government.

In July 1856, Guatemalan and Salvadoran soldiers captured the city of León and declared Belloso as the commanding general of the Nicaraguan Army. In September 1856, Nicaraguan forces defeated filibusters at the Battle of San Jacinto. Later that month, Guatemalan, Salvadoran, and Legitimist forces occupied the city of Masaya. Walker left Granada on 10 October to repel the invasion, but this left the city undefended and around 700 Legitimist soldiers from Diriomo captured Granada on 12 October. Walker was defeated at the Battle of Masaya and returned to Granada, successfully retaking the city. In November, 400 Costa Rican soldiers commanded by General José María Cañas recaptured the transit road and repelled a filibuster attack led by Collier Hornsby.

=== Fall of Walker's government ===
In November 1856, Walker attempted to capture Masaya a second time but was again defeated. He then ordered the evacuation of Granada and instructed Charles Frederick Henningsen to destroy the city. The joint forces of Costa Rica, El Salvador, Guatemala, and the Legitimists then began the Siege of Granada. In December, a force of 200 Hondurans commanded by General Florencio Xatruch arrived to support the Central Americans. Walker launched a surprise attack from Lake Nicaragua but later withdrew alongside Henningsen.

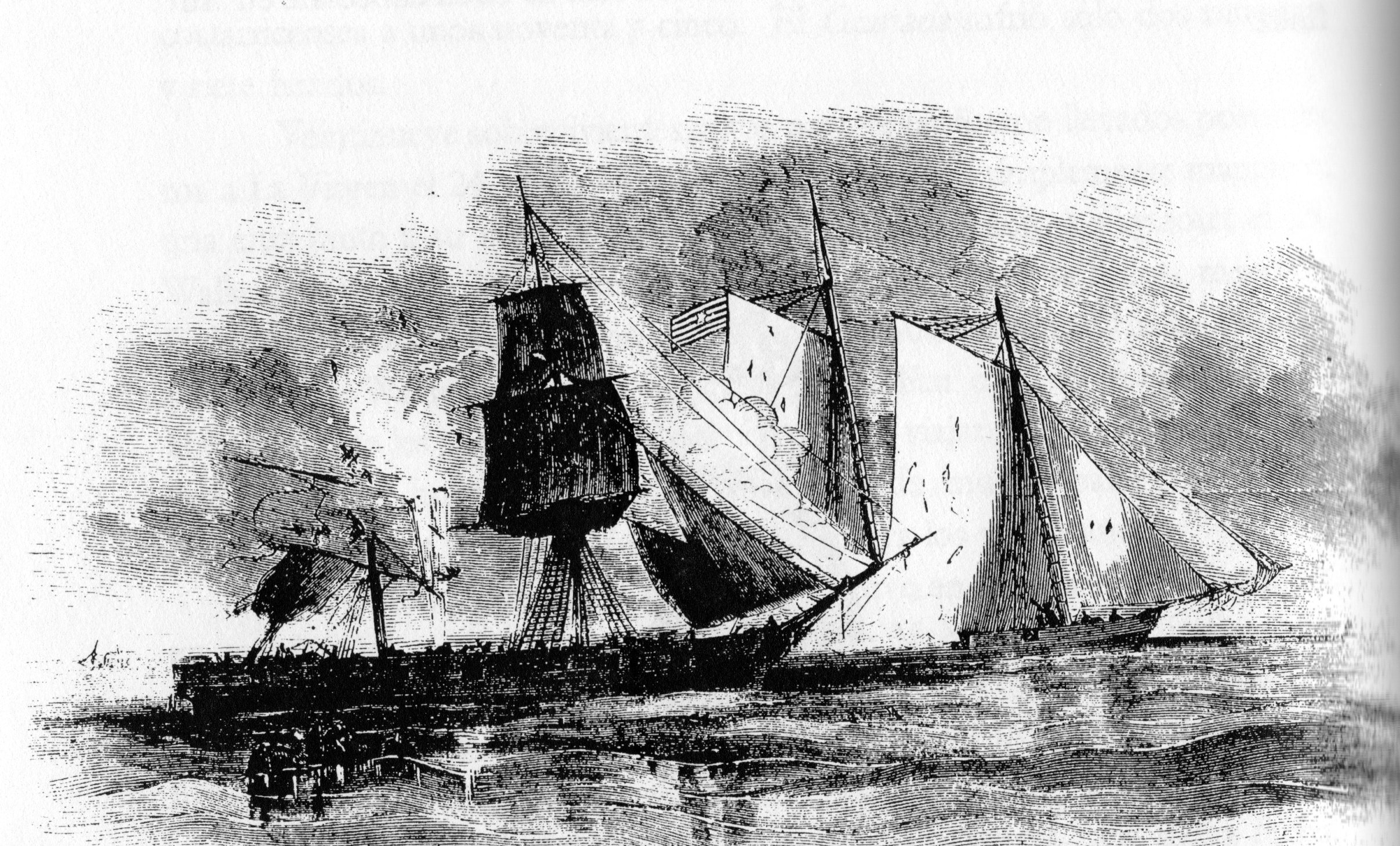
A depiction of the Action of 23 November 1856

Filibusters defeated the Costa Ricans in the sole naval engagement of the war on 23 November 1856 when the ship Granada sank the Once de Abril, killing 66 Costa Ricans. In December 1856, militiamen sponsored by Vanderbilt and led by Sylvanus H. Spencer invaded Nicaragua from Costa Rica and captured the city of Greytown at the mouth of the San Juan River, destroying several steamers in the process. Wheeler asked British captain James Erskine (who was in the region at the time) to intervene, but Erskine declined. In January 1857, Henningsen attacked a Central American army in San Jorge but was repelled.

In February 1857, Mora issued a proclamation granting free passage out of Nicaragua to any of Walker's filibusters that deserted. In April, Garrison and Morgan left Nicaragua as their businesses had failed and took all their steamships with them. On 1 May 1857, Walker and his remaining allies surrendered to United States Navy commander Charles Henry Davis who offered them safe passage out of the country.

== Casualties ==
According to Henningsen, of Walker's 2,518 total soldiers, 1,000 were killed in action or died to disease, 80 were captured, and 700 deserted. He also estimated that 5,680 Central American soldiers were killed or wounded with an unknown number more dying to disease. According to Luis L.Schenoni, roughly 10,000 Costa Ricans died of causes related to the war, at a time when the country’s population was approximately 100,000.

== Aftermath ==
Despite the failure of Walker's 1855–1857 expedition, he launched a second attempt to take control of Nicaragua in November 1857. U.S. Navy commodore Hiram Paulding landed soldiers in Puntarenas. They arrested Walker and his filibusters the following month and brought them back to the United States. In January 1859, Walker converted from the Disciples of Christ to Catholicism, but many in Central America believed that Walker's conversion was an attempt to gain support ahead of another future filibuster expedition to the region. Walker did launch a third and final filibuster expedition to Nicaragua in mid 1860. Walker was quickly arrested by British captain Nowell Salmon and handed over to Honduran custody for trial. On 12 September 1860, Walker was executed by firing squad in Trujillo, Honduras.

Central America–United States relations were strained by the Filibuster War and American immigration to the region effectively ceased.

Several authors point to this war as key in the formation of Costa Rican state.

== Legacy ==
Central American leaders accused Walker and his men of being sexual predators. Mora described Walker and the filibusters as the "scum of all peoples" who wanted to "invade Costa Rica to find in our wives and daughters [...] gratification for their local passions".

On 15 September 1895, the Costa Rican government inaugurated the National Monument of Costa Rica in San José to commemorate the Central American victory against Walker. The monument was created by French sculptor Louis-Robert Carrier-Belleuse.

== See also ==
- Juan Santamaría
- Republic of Baja California
