= William Walker (filibuster) =

American physician, lawyer, journalist, and mercenary (1824–1860)

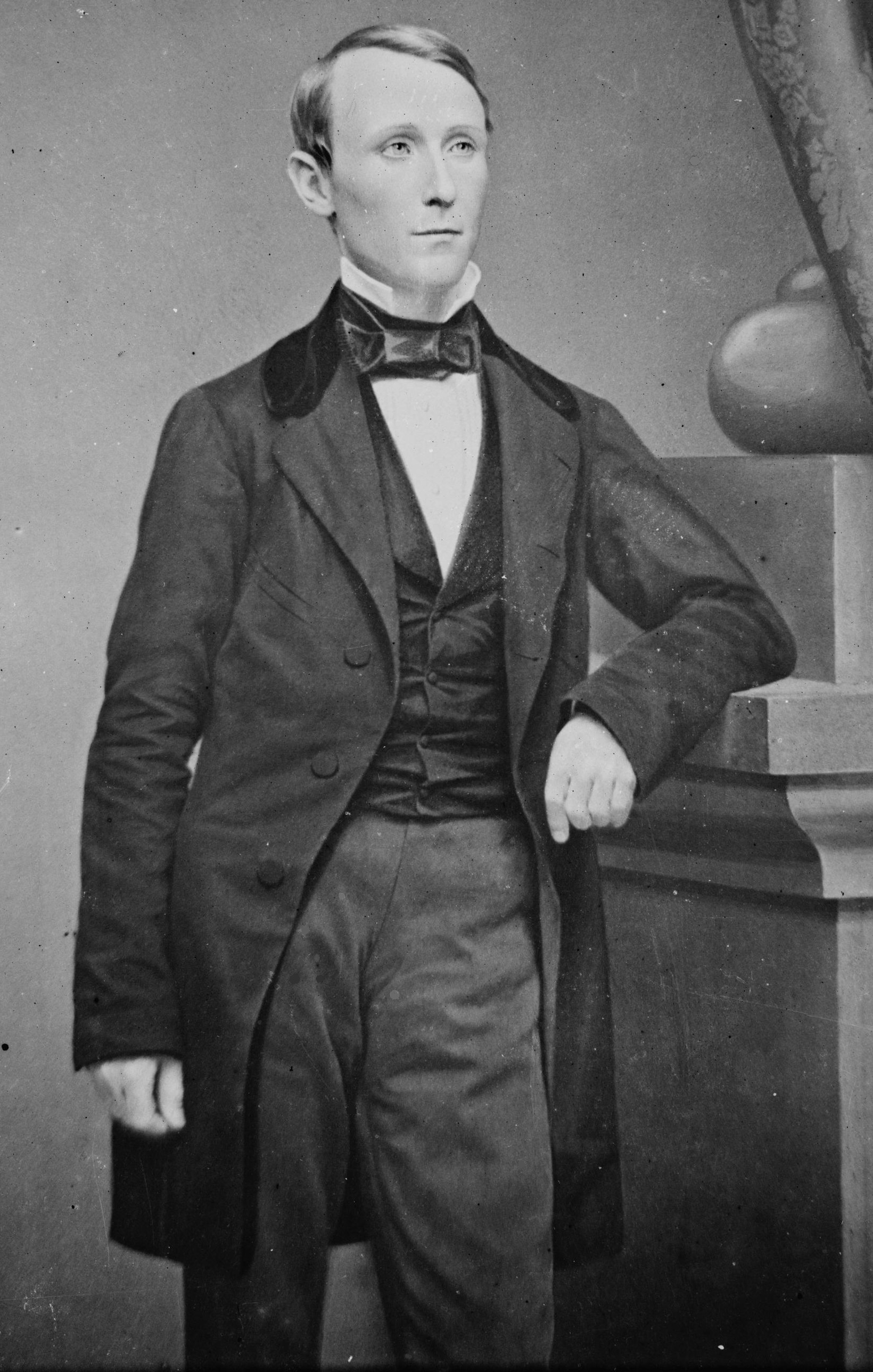
- Walker in c. 1855–1860

President of Nicaragua (unrecognized)
- In office July 12, 1856 – May 1, 1857
- Preceded by: Patricio Rivas
- Succeeded by: Máximo Jerez and Tomás Martínez

President of Sonora (unrecognized)
- In office January 21, 1854 – May 8, 1854

President of Baja California (unrecognized)
- In office November 3, 1853 – January 21, 1854

Personal details
- Born: May 8, 1824 Nashville, Tennessee, U.S.
- Died: September 12, 1860 (aged 36) Trujillo, Colón, Honduras
- Cause of death: Execution by firing squad
- Resting place: Old Trujillo Cemetery, Trujillo, Colón, Honduras
- Party: Democratic (Nicaragua)
- Education: University of Nashville; University of Edinburgh; University of Pennsylvania; Heidelberg University
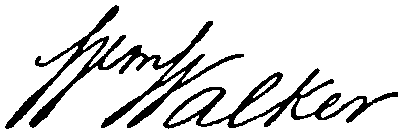
- Signature

William Walker (May 8, 1824 – September 12, 1860) was an American journalist and mercenary. In the era of the expansion of the United States, driven by the doctrine of manifest destiny, Walker organized unauthorized military expeditions into Mexico and Central America with the intention of establishing colonies. Such an enterprise was known at the time as "filibustering".

After settling in California, motivated by an earlier filibustering project of Gaston de Raousset-Boulbon, Walker attempted in 1853–54 to take Baja California and Sonora. He declared those territories to be an independent Republic of Sonora, but he was soon driven back to California by the Mexican forces. Walker then went to Nicaragua in 1855 as leader of a mercenary army employed by the Nicaraguan Democratic Party in its civil war against the Legitimists. He took control of the Nicaraguan government and in July 1856 set himself up as the country's president.

Walker's regime was recognized as the legitimate government of Nicaragua by US President Franklin Pierce, and it initially enjoyed the support of some important sectors within Nicaraguan society. As ruler of Nicaragua, Walker relegalized slavery, with the goal of creating a new society of dominant White people and subordinate Black and Indigenous laborers. However, he never succeeded in implementing slavery. He also threatened the independence of neighboring Central American republics. Walker antagonized the powerful Wall Street tycoon Cornelius Vanderbilt by expropriating Vanderbilt's Accessory Transit Company, which operated one of the main routes for the transport of passengers going from New York City to San Francisco. The British Empire saw Walker as a threat to its interests in the possible construction of a Nicaragua Canal. A military coalition led by the allied forces of Central America defeated Walker and forced him to resign the presidency of Nicaragua on May 1, 1857.

Walker tried to relaunch his filibustering project and sought renewed support from pro-slavery forces in the Southern United States on the eve of the American Civil War. In 1860, he published a book titled The War in Nicaragua, which promoted his efforts to conquer Central America in order to expand slavery geographically. That year, he returned to Central America, where the British Royal Navy arrested him and handed him to the government of Honduras, which executed him.

== Biography ==
=== Early life ===
William Walker was born in Nashville, Tennessee, in 1824 to James Walker and his wife Mary Norvell. His father was a Scottish settler. His mother was the daughter of Lipscomb Norvell, an American Revolutionary War officer from Virginia. One of Walker's maternal uncles was John Norvell, a U.S. Senator from Michigan and founder of The Philadelphia Inquirer.

Walker graduated summa cum laude from the University of Nashville at the age of 14. In 1843, at the age of 19, he received a medical degree from the University of Pennsylvania. Walker then continued his medical studies at Edinburgh and Heidelberg. He practiced medicine briefly in Philadelphia, but soon moved to New Orleans where he studied law privately. In New Orleans, he developed a romantic attraction for a deaf woman, Helen Martin, and learned sign language to communicate with her. While the precise nature of their relationship is uncertain, Martin's subsequent death from yellow fever led Walker to develop "a daring ambition and a reckless disregard of life".

Walker practiced law for a short time, then quit to become co-owner and editor of The Daily Crescent newspaper in March 1849. The Crescent was a liberal, anti-slavery newspaper. In October 1849, Walker attended the Memphis Railroad Convention with fellow Crescent editor J.C. Larue, which explored possible routes for a transcontinental railroad connecting the Mississippi Valley to the Pacific Ocean. Multiple proposals at the convention argued for a route in Central America, including across Nicaragua. Walker and Larue were accused in November, 1849 of assaulting E.J. Gomez, the owner of a rival newspaper, La Patria, over a claim made in that paper about The Daily Crescent. After selling his stake in the paper, Walker left for San Francisco in July, 1850.

In San Francisco, Walker worked as editor of the San Francisco Herald and fought three duels; he was wounded in two of them. In the early 1850s, many military expeditions that sought to create colonies in Mexico and Central America, called filibusters, were developing in San Francisco. Also known as freebooting, this practice was supported by the Southern expansionist secret society, the Knights of the Golden Circle.

Walker gained national attention by dueling with law clerk William Hicks Graham on January 12, 1851. Walker criticized Graham and his colleagues in the Herald, which prompted Graham to challenge Walker to a duel. Graham was a notorious gunman; Walker had experience dueling with single-shot pistols, but his duel with Graham was fought with revolvers. Walker was wounded; Graham was arrested but was quickly released. The duel was recorded in The Daily Alta California.

=== Advocacy of slavery ===
Growing up in Tennessee, Walker's family did not own slaves and they did not advocate the institution; in his early period as a journalist he was an abolitionist. However, when he became a filibuster he became convinced the plantation slave system of the southern US required export to Latin America in order to survive, which became an essential civic goal.

Historian Dan La Botz suggests Walker may have been convinced of this by his friend Edmund Randolph, a lawyer from Virginia.

=== Invasion of Mexico ===
In the summer of 1853, Walker traveled to Guaymas in Mexico, seeking a grant from the Mexican government to establish a colony. He proposed that his colony would serve as a fortified frontier, protecting U.S. soil from Indian raids. Mexico refused, and Walker returned to San Francisco determined to obtain his colony regardless of Mexico's position. He began recruiting American supporters of slavery and of the Manifest Destiny doctrine, mostly inhabitants of Tennessee and Kentucky. Walker's plans then expanded from forming a buffer colony to establishing an independent Republic of Sonora, which might eventually take its place as a part of the Union (as the Republic of Texas had done in 1845). He funded his project by "selling scrips which were redeemable in lands of Sonora".

Flag of the Republic of Sonora

On October 15, 1853, Walker set out with forty-five men to conquer the Mexican territories of Baja California Territory and Sonora State. He succeeded in capturing La Paz, the capital of sparsely populated Baja California, which he declared the capital of a new "Republic of Lower California" (declared November 3, 1853), with himself as president and his former law partner, Henry P. Watkins, as vice president. Walker then put the region under the laws of the American state of Louisiana, which made slavery legal. Whether Walker at this stage intended to tie his filibustering expedition to the cause of slavery is a matter of dispute.

In his writings about this time, Walker advocated white paternalism, justifying his forays into Mexico on the grounds that Indian, mestizo, and African peoples of Latin America require white dominance to civilize them.

Fearful of attacks by Mexico, Walker moved his headquarters twice over the next three months, first to Cabo San Lucas, and then further north to Ensenada to maintain a more secure base of operations. Although he never gained control of Sonora, he pronounced Baja California part of the larger Republic of Sonora. Lack of supplies, severe aridity of Baja California and strong resistance by the Mexican government quickly forced Walker to retreat.

Back in California, Walker was indicted by a federal grand jury for waging an illegal war in violation of the Neutrality Act of 1794. However, in the era of Manifest Destiny, Walker's filibustering project had popular support in the southern and western U.S. Walker was tried before Judge I. S. K. Ogier in the US District Court for the Southern District of California. Although two of Walker's associates had already been convicted of similar charges and Judge Ogier summarized the evidence against Walker for the jury, the jury deliberated for only eight minutes before acquitting Walker.

=== Invasion of Nicaragua ===
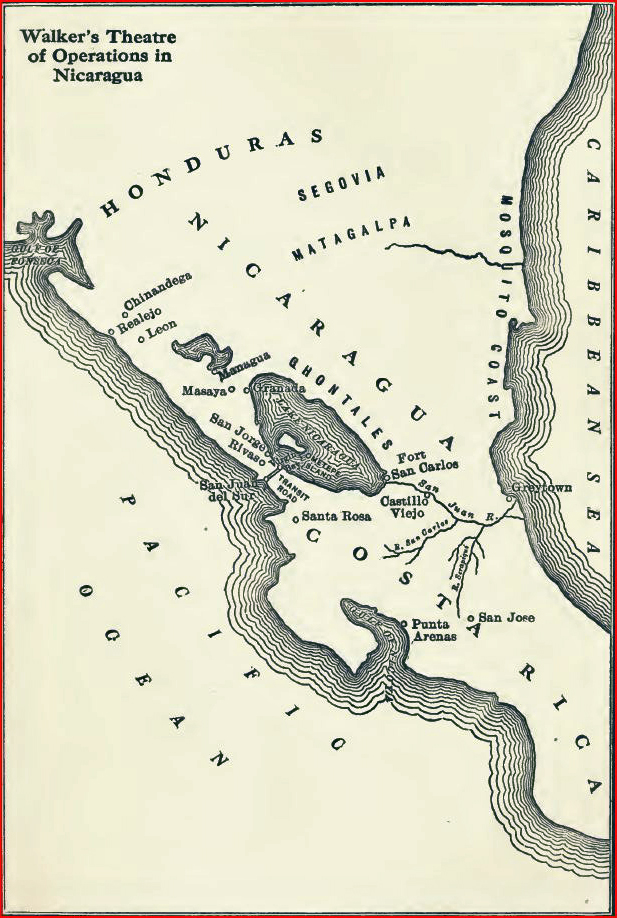
William Walker's Nicaragua map

Since there was no inter-oceanic route between the Atlantic and Pacific Oceans at the time, and the transcontinental railway did not yet exist, a major trade route between New York City and San Francisco ran through southern Nicaragua. Ships from New York entered the San Juan River from the Atlantic and sailed across Lake Nicaragua. People and goods were then transported by stagecoach across a narrow strip of land near the city of Rivas, before reaching the Pacific and ships to San Francisco. The commercial exploitation of this route had been granted by Nicaragua to the Accessory Transit Company, controlled by shipping magnate Cornelius Vanderbilt.

In 1854, a civil war erupted in Nicaragua between the Legitimist Party (also called the Conservative Party), based in the city of Granada, and the Democratic Party (also called the Liberal Party), based in León. The Democratic Party sought military support from Walker who, to circumvent U.S. neutrality laws, obtained a contract from Democratic president Francisco Castellón to bring as many as three hundred "colonists" to Nicaragua. These mercenaries received the right to bear arms in the service of the Democratic government. Walker sailed from San Francisco on May 3, 1855, with approximately sixty men. Upon landing, the force was reinforced by 110 locals. With Walker's expeditionary force was the well-known explorer and journalist Charles Wilkins Webber, as well as Belgian-born adventurer Charles Frederick Henningsen, a veteran of the First Carlist War, the Hungarian Revolution, and the war in Circassia. Besides Henningsen, three members of Walker's forces who became Confederate officers were Birkett D. Fry, Robert C. Tyler, and Chatham Roberdeau Wheat.

With Castellón's consent, Walker attacked the Legitimists in Rivas, near the trans-isthmian route. He was driven off, but not without inflicting heavy casualties. In this First Battle of Rivas, a schoolteacher called Enmanuel Mongalo y Rubio (1834–1872) burned the Filibuster headquarters. On September 3, during the Battle of La Virgen, Walker defeated the Legitimist army. On October 13, he conquered Granada and took effective control of the country. Initially, as commander of the army, Walker ruled Nicaragua through provisional President Patricio Rivas. U.S. President Franklin Pierce recognized Walker's regime as the legitimate government of Nicaragua on May 20, 1856, and on June 3 the Democratic national convention expressed support of the effort to "regenerate" Nicaragua. However, Walker's first ambassadorial appointment, Colonel Parker H. French, was refused recognition. On September 22, Walker repealed Nicaraguan laws prohibiting slavery, attempting to gain support from the Southern states.

Walker wanted to create a new type of society organized by race and caste and dominated by white supremacy, with the mestizo majority of Nicaragua somehow eliminated. In his own words:

The introduction of negro-slavery into Nicaragua would furnish a supply of constant and reliable labour requisite for the cultivation of tropical products. With the negro-slave as his companion, the white man would become fixed to the soil; and they together would destroy the power of mixed race which is the bane of the country. The pure Indian would readily fall into the new social organisation.

Walker's actions in the region caused concern in neighboring countries and potential U.S. and European investors who feared he would pursue further military conquests in Central America. Walker aimed to use Nicaragua as a base to conquer to the rest of Central America as well as Cuba and the other Caribbean islands. C. K. Garrison and Charles Morgan, subordinates of Vanderbilt's Accessory Transit Company, provided financial and logistical support to the Filibusters in exchange for Walker, as ruler of Nicaragua, seizing the company's property (on the pretext of a charter violation) and turning it over to Garrison and Morgan. Outraged, Vanderbilt dispatched two secret agents to the Costa Rican government with plans to fight Walker. They would help regain control of Vanderbilt's steamboats which had become a logistical lifeline for Walker's army.

Concerned about Walker's intentions in the region, Costa Rican President Juan Rafael Mora Porras rejected his diplomatic overtures and began preparing the country's military for a potential conflict. Walker organized a battalion of four companies, of which one was composed of Germans, a second of Frenchmen, and the other two of Americans, totaling 240 men placed under the command of Colonel Schlessinger to invade Costa Rica in a preemptive action. This advance force was defeated at the Battle of Santa Rosa on March 20, 1856.

The most important strategic defeat of Walker came during the Campaign of 1856–57 when the Costa Rican army, led by Porras, General José Joaquín Mora Porras (the president's brother), and General José María Cañas (1809–1860), defeated the Filibusters in Rivas on April 11, 1856 (the Second Battle of Rivas). It was in this battle that the soldier and drummer Juan Santamaría sacrificed himself by setting the Filibuster stronghold on fire. In parallel with Enmanuel Mongalo y Rubio in Nicaragua, Santamaría would become Costa Rica's national hero. Walker deliberately contaminated the water wells of Rivas with corpses. Later, a cholera epidemic spread to the Costa Rican troops and the civilian population of Rivas. Within a few months nearly 10,000 civilians had died, almost ten percent of the population of Costa Rica.

Flag of Nicaragua under Walker

From the north, President José Santos Guardiola sent Honduran troops under the leadership of the Xatruch brothers, who joined Salvadoran troops to fight Walker. Florencio Xatruch led his troops against Walker and the filibusters in la Puebla, Rivas. Later, because of the opposition of other Central American armies, José Joaquín Mora Porras was made Commandant General-in-Chief of the Allied Armies of Central America in the Third Battle of Rivas (April 1857).

During this civil war, Honduras and El Salvador recognized Xatruch as brigade and division general. On June 12, 1857, after Walker surrendered, Xatruch made a triumphant entrance to Comayagua, which was then the capital of Honduras. Both the nickname by which Hondurans are known today, Catracho, and the more infamous nickname for Salvadorans, "Salvatrucho", are derived from Xatruch's figure and successful campaign as leader of the allied armies of Central America, as the troops of El Salvador and Honduras were national heroes, fighting side by side as Central American brothers against William Walker's troops.

As the general and his soldiers returned from battle, some Nicaraguans affectionately yelled out "¡Vienen los xatruches!" ("Here come Xatruch's boys!") However, Nicaraguans had trouble pronouncing the general's Catalan name, so they altered the phrase to "los catruches" and ultimately to "los catrachos".

A key role was played by the Costa Rican Army in unifying the other Central American armies to fight against Filibusters. The "Campaign of the Transit" (1857) is the name given by Costa Rican historians to the groups of several battles fought by the Costa Rican Army, supervised by Colonel Salvador Mora, and led by Colonel Blanco and Colonel Salazar at the San Juan River. By establishing control of this bi-national river at its border with Nicaragua, Costa Rica prevented military reinforcements from reaching Walker and his Filibuster troops via the Caribbean Sea. Also, Costa Rican diplomacy neutralized U.S. official support for Walker by taking advantage of the dispute between the magnate Cornelius Vanderbilt and William Walker.

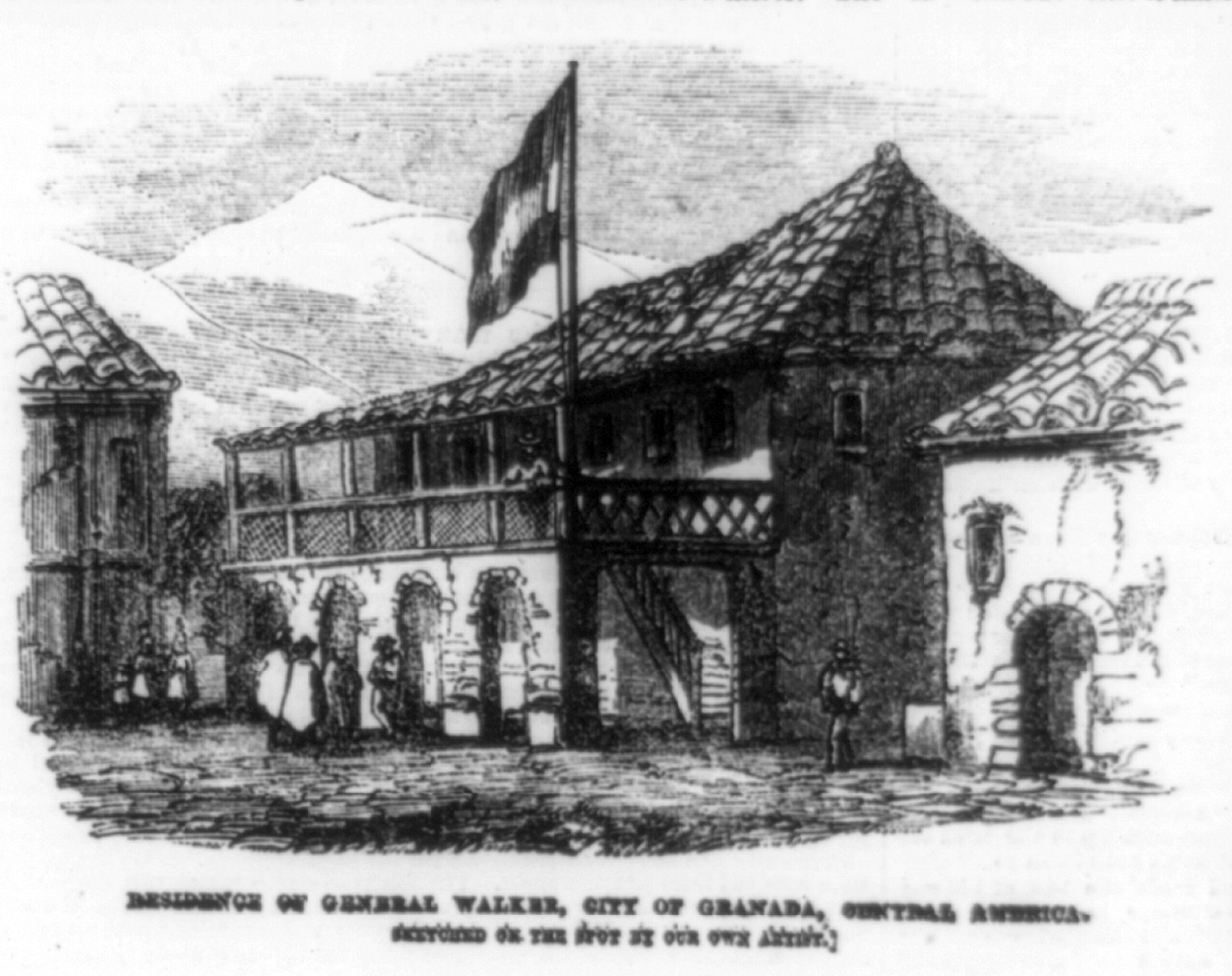
President Walker's house in Granada, Nicaragua. On October 12, 1856, during the siege of Granada, Guatemalan officer José Víctor Zavala ran under heavy fire to capture Walker's flag and bring it back to the Central American coalition army trenches shouting "Filibuster bullets don't kill!". Zavala survived this adventure unscathed.

Walker took up residence in Granada and set himself up as President of Nicaragua, after conducting a fraudulent election. He was inaugurated on July 12, 1856, and soon launched an Americanization program, reinstating slavery, declaring English an official language, and reorganizing currency and fiscal policy to encourage emigration from the United States. Realizing that his position was becoming precarious, he sought support from the Southerners in the U.S. by recasting his campaign as a fight to spread the institution of black slavery, which was the basis of the Southern agrarian economy. With this in mind, Walker revoked Nicaragua's emancipation edict of 1821. This move increased Walker's popularity among Southern whites and attracted the attention of Pierre Soulé, an influential New Orleans politician, who campaigned to raise support for Walker's war. Nevertheless, Walker's army was weakened by massive defections and an epidemic of cholera and was finally defeated by the Central American coalition led by Costa Rican President Juan Rafael Mora Porras (1814–1860).

On October 12, 1856, Guatemalan Colonel José Víctor Zavala crossed the square of the city to the house where Walker's soldiers took shelter. Under heavy fire, he reached the enemy's flag and carried it back with him, shouting to his men that the Filibuster bullets did not kill.

On December 14, 1856, as Granada was surrounded by 4,000 troops from Costa Rica, Honduras, El Salvador, and Guatemala, along with independent Nicaraguan allies, Charles Frederick Henningsen, one of Walker's generals, ordered his men to set the city ablaze before escaping and fighting their way to Lake Nicaragua. When retreating from Granada, the oldest Spanish colonial city in Nicaragua, he left a detachment with orders to level it in order to instill, as he put it, "a salutary dread of American justice". It took them over two weeks to smash, burn and flatten the city; all that remained were inscriptions on the ruins that read "Aqui Fue Granada" ("Here was Granada").

On May 1, 1857, Walker surrendered to Commander Charles Henry Davis of the United States Navy under the pressure of Costa Rica and the Central American armies and was repatriated. Upon disembarking in New York City, he was greeted as a hero, but he alienated public opinion when he blamed his defeat on the U.S. Navy. Within six months, he set off on another expedition, but he was arrested by the U.S. Navy Home Squadron under the command of Commodore Hiram Paulding and once again returned to the U.S. amid considerable public controversy over the legality of the navy's actions.

=== Conviction and execution ===
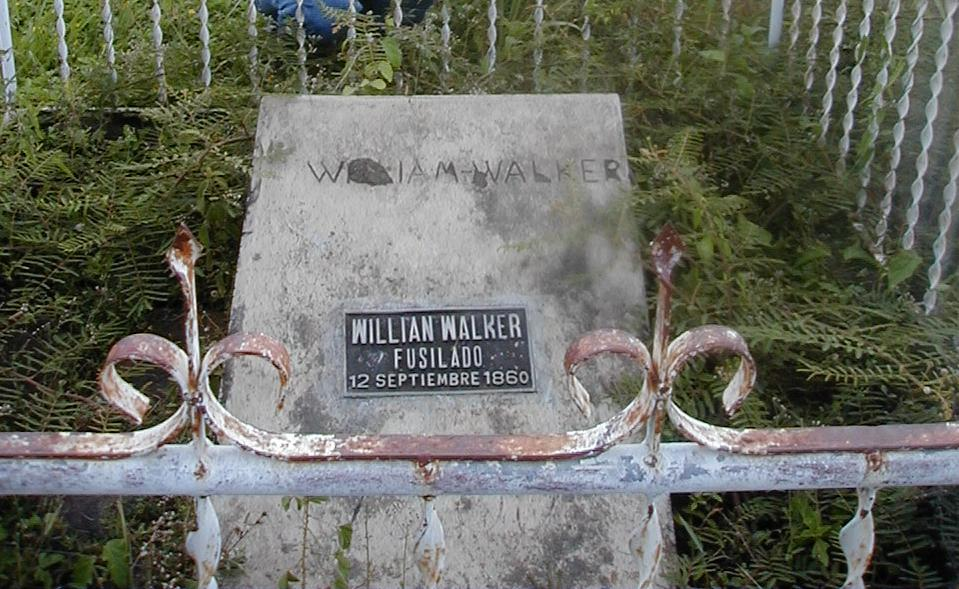
William Walker's grave in the Old Trujillo Cemetery, Trujillo, Honduras

After writing an account of his Central American campaign (published in 1860 as War in Nicaragua), Walker once again returned to the region. British colonists in Roatán, Bay Islands, fearing the Honduran government would move to assert its control over them, approached Walker with an offer to help him in establishing an independent, English-speaking administration over the islands. Walker disembarked in the port city of Trujillo but was arrested by Royal Navy officer Nowell Salmon. Britain, which maintained control over nearby British Honduras and the Mosquito Coast and planned on constructing an inter-oceanic canal through Central America, regarded Walker as a threat to its own affairs in the region.

Salmon sailed to Trujillo and handed Walker and his chief of staff A.F. Rudler over to the Honduran government. Both men were tried by a Honduran military court on charges of piracy and "filibusterism". In his defense, Walker argued that "piracy" involved robbery at sea and claimed "filibusterism" was not a recognized legal term. Rudler was sentenced to four years of hard labor in Honduran mines, but Walker was sentenced to be executed by firing squad. The execution was carried out near the site of the present-day hospital, on September 12, 1860. William Walker was 36 years old. He is buried in the "Old Cemetery", Trujillo, Honduras.

== Influence and reputation ==
William Walker convinced many Southerners of the desirability of creating a slave-holding empire in tropical Latin America. In 1861, when U.S. Senator John J. Crittenden proposed that the 36°30' parallel north be declared as a line of demarcation between free and slave territories, some Republicans denounced such an arrangement, with New York congressman Roscoe Conkling saying that it "would amount to a perpetual covenant of war against every people, tribe, and State owning a foot of land between here and Tierra del Fuego".

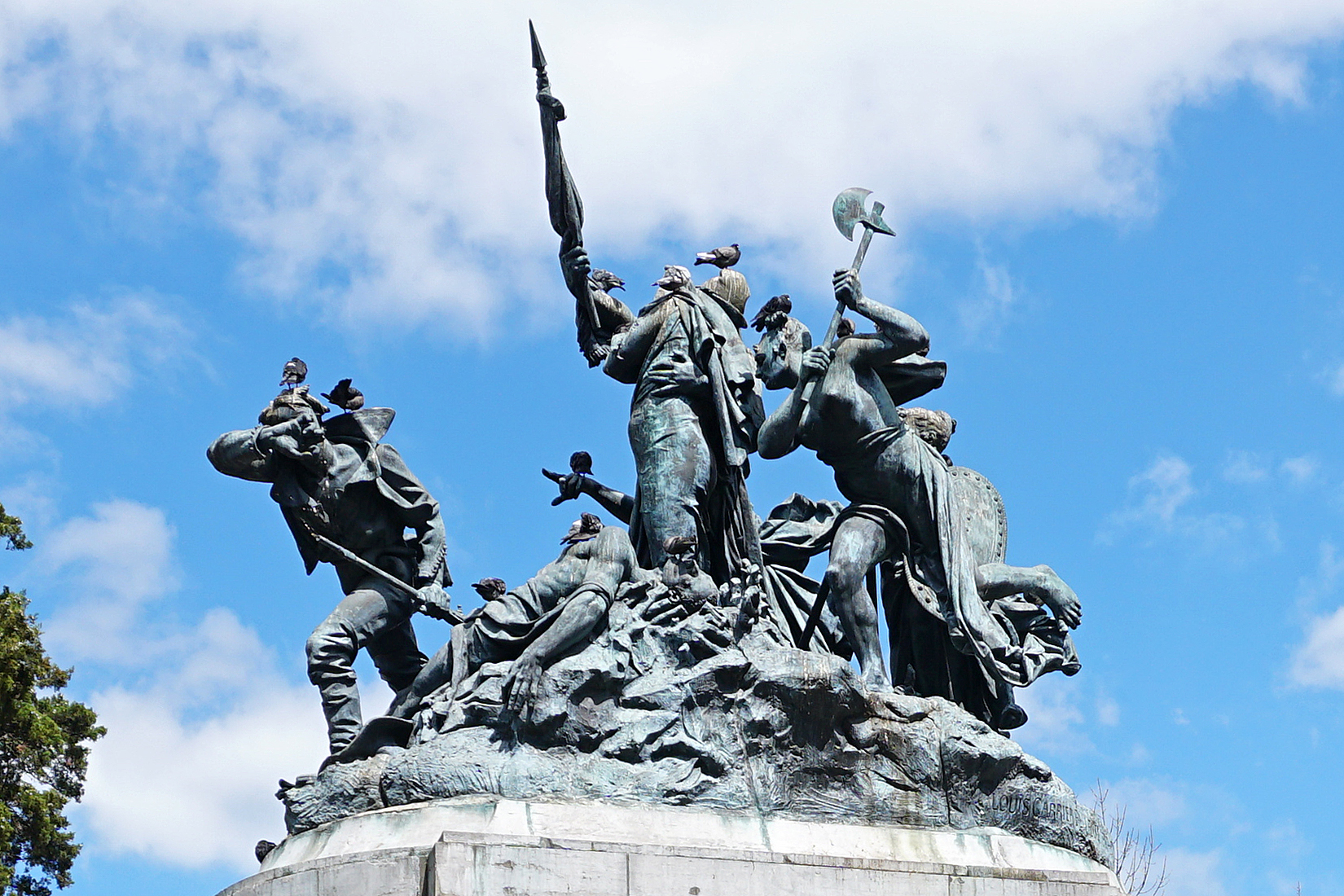
The Costa Rica National Monument represents the five united Central American nations carrying weapons and William Walker fleeing.

Before the end of the American Civil War, Walker's memory enjoyed great popularity in the southern and western United States, where he was known as "General Walker" and as the "gray-eyed man of destiny". Northerners, on the other hand, generally regarded him as a pirate. Despite his intelligence and personal charm, Walker consistently proved to be a poor military and political leader. Unlike men of similar ambition, such as Cecil Rhodes, Walker's grandiose scheming ultimately failed.

In Central American countries, the successful military campaign of 1856–1857 against William Walker became a source of national pride and identity, and it was later promoted by local historians and politicians as substitute for the war of independence that Central America had not experienced. April 11 is a Costa Rican national holiday in memory of Walker's defeat at Rivas. Juan Santamaría, who played a key role in that battle, is honored as one of two Costa Rican national heroes, the other one being Juan Rafael Mora himself. The main airport serving San José (in Alajuela) is named in Santamaría's honor.

To this day, Central America's shared history is remembered and celebrated as a source of unity among the nations of Costa Rica, Honduras, El Salvador, Guatemala, and Nicaragua.

== Cultural legacy ==
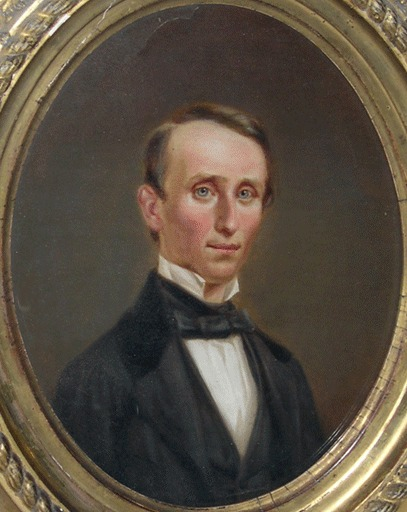
Portrait by George Dury

Walker's campaigns in Lower California and Nicaragua are the subject of a historical novel by Alfred Neumann, published in German as Der Pakt (1949), and translated in English as Strange Conquest (a previous UK edition was published as Look Upon This Man). Walker's campaign in Nicaragua has inspired two films, both of which take considerable liberties with his story: Burn! (1969) directed by Gillo Pontecorvo, starring Marlon Brando, and Walker (1987) directed by Alex Cox, starring Ed Harris. Walker's name is used for the main character in Burn!, though the character is not meant to represent the historical William Walker and is portrayed as British. On the other hand, Alex Cox's Walker incorporates into its surrealist narrative many of the signposts of William Walker's life and exploits, including his original excursions into northern Mexico to his trial and acquittal on breaking the neutrality act to the triumph of his assault on Nicaragua and his execution.

Shortly after taking power in Nicaragua, Walker established the newspaper El Nicaraguense "as a means of diffusing information concerning the natural resources and advantages of Nicaragua, no less than as a chronicle of current events".

In Part Five, Chapter 48, of Gone with the Wind, Margaret Mitchell cites William Walker, "and how he died against a wall in Truxillo", as a topic of conversation between Rhett Butler and his filibustering acquaintances, while Rhett and Scarlett O'Hara are on honeymoon in New Orleans.

A poem written by Nicaraguan Catholic priest and minister of culture from 1979 to 1987 during the Sandinista period Ernesto Cardenal, Con Walker En Nicaragua, translated as With Walker in Nicaragua, gives a historical treatment of the affair from the Nicaraguan perspective.

The villain of the Nantucket series, by science fiction writer S. M. Stirling, is an American Coast Guard officer named William Walker who is transported back in time from 1998 to 1250 BCE. Walker leads a filibuster force to Mycenaean Greece and initiates a version of the Trojan War with firearms.

John Neal's 1859 novel True Womanhood includes a character who travels from the US to Nicaragua to participate in Walker's campaign there. This may be based on his son James or his friend's son, Appleton Oaksmith, both of whom made similar trips.

== Works ==
- Walker, William. The War in Nicaragua. New York (NY): S.H. Goetzel, 1860.
- The War in Nicaragua at Project Gutenberg

== See also ==
- Gaston de Raousset-Boulbon
- Knights of the Golden Circle, a secret society interested in annexing territories in Mexico, Central America, and the Caribbean to be added to the United States as slave states
- Nicaragua Canal
- Panama Canal
- Florencio Xatruch
- Granada, Nicaragua, the colonial city that William Walker destroyed
