= Filibuster (military) =

Unauthorized foreign military expedition

A filibuster (from the Spanish filibustero), also known as a freebooter, is someone who engages in an unauthorized military expedition into a foreign country or territory to foster or support a political revolution or secession. The term is usually applied to United States citizens who incited rebellions/insurrections across Latin America with its recently independent but unstable nations freed from royal control of the Kingdom of Spain and its Spanish Empire in the 1810s and 1820s. These occurred particularly in the mid-19th century, usually with the goal of establishing an American-loyal regime that could later be annexed into the North American Union as territories or free states, serving the interests of the United States. Probably the most notable example is the Filibuster War initiated by William Walker in the 1850s in Nicaragua and Central America.

Filibusters are irregular soldiers who act without official authorization from their own government, and they are generally motivated by financial gain, political ideology, or the thrill of adventure. Unlike mercenaries who work on behalf of others, filibusters are independently motivated and work for themselves. The freewheeling actions of the filibusters of the 1850s led to the name being applied figuratively later in the North American English language political idiom of the political and legislative delaying act of filibustering in the United States Congress, especially in the upper chamber of the U.S. Senate. Military filibustering can be considered a form of freelance imperialism. Filibusters typically failed because of "lack of resources" although the regular U.S. Army sometimes attempted to intervene.

== History ==
A Jolly Roger used by filibusters during a land engagement in Mexico in 1688, described as a "red flag with a death's head at the center and two crossed bones below the head, in white, in the middle of the red"

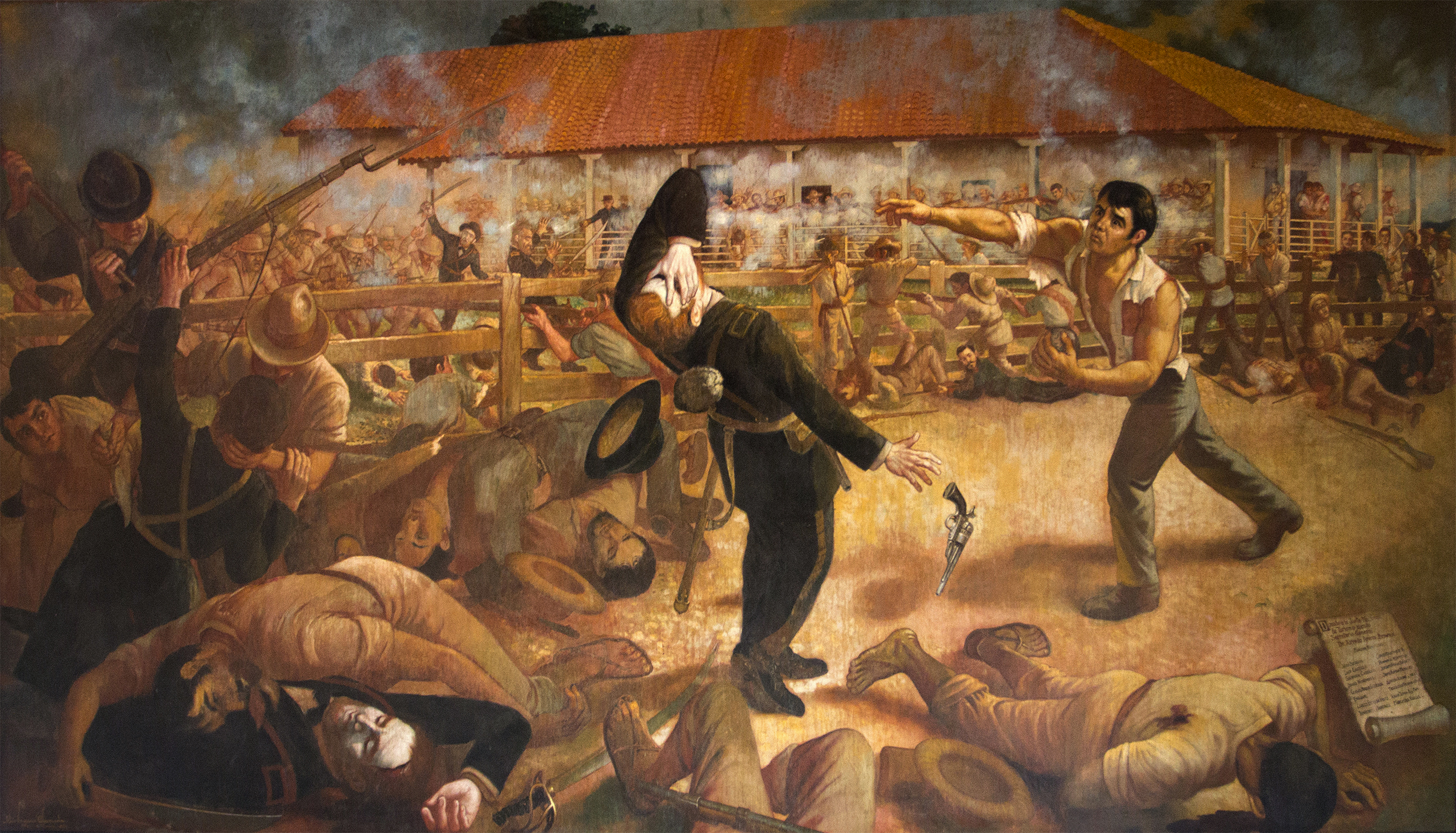
Battle of San Jacinto in Nicaragua in 1856

The English term "filibuster" derives from the Spanish filibustero, itself deriving originally from the Dutch vrijbuiter, 'privateer, pirate, robber' (also the root of English freebooter). The Spanish form entered the English language in the 1850s, as applied to military adventurers from the United States then operating in Central America and the Spanish West Indies.

The Spanish language term was first applied to persons raiding Spanish colonies and merchant ships of the Kingdom of Spain and its Spanish Empire in the Americas, in the West Indies islands of the Caribbean, the most famous of whom was the Englishman naval hero and captain, Sir Francis Drake (c. 1540 – 1596) of the beginning Royal Navy of the Kingdom of England, with his June 1572 sea campaign and infamous raid and sacking of the town on Nombre de Dios of (Colón Province in modern Panama in Central America). With the end of the era of Caribbean / West Indies piracy in the early 18th century, the term of reference "filibuster" fell out of general currency for a while.

The term was revived in the following mid-19th century to describe the actions of adventurers who tried to take control of various Caribbean / West Indies islands, Mexican, and Central American territories by force of arms. In 1806, the general Francisco de Miranda launched an unsuccessful expedition to liberate Venezuela from Royal Spanish rule with volunteers from the United States recruited in New York City. The three most prominent filibusters of that era were Narciso López (1797–1851) and John Quitman (1798–1858), both in Cuba, along with William Walker (1824–1860), with the Walker affair in Baja California, Sonora of northern Mexico; along with further south to Costa Rica and lastly Nicaragua in Central America. The term returned to North American English language parlance to refer to López's 1851 Cuban expedition.

Other filibusters include the Americans Aaron Burr (former Vice President of the United States, about the Louisiana Purchase / Louisiana Territory and old Southwest Territory), Chatham Roberdeau Wheat (Cuba, Mexico, and Italy), William Blount (old Southwest Territory / West Florida / Florida), James Long (Texas / Republic of Texas), Augustus W. Magee (Texas / Republic of Texas), George Mathews (East Florida / Florida), George Rogers Clark (Louisiana Purchase / Louisiana Territory and old Southwest Territory / Mississippi Territory), William S. Smith (Venezuela), Ira Allen (Canada), Thomas Jordan (Cuba), William A. Chanler (Cuba and Venezuela), Samuel Brannan (Kingdom of Hawaii / Hawaii), Joseph C. Morehead (Mazatlán, Mexico), Henry Alexander Crabb (Sonora, northern Mexico), and Jordan Goudreau (Venezuela).

Non-American filibusters include the French Adel Aubert du Petit-Thouars (Tahiti), Hippolyte Bouchard (Philippines, Hawaii, California, Central America), Marquis Charles de Pindray and Count Gaston de Raousset-Boulbon (Sonora, northern Mexico), the Dutch Luis Brion (Venezuela), the British Gregor MacGregor (Florida, Central America, and South America), and Thomas Cochcrane (Peru), the Italians Giuseppe Garibaldi (Italy) and Gabriel D'Annuzio in Fiume, the Peruvian Leoncio Prado (Cuba), the Cubans Ambrosio José Gonzales , Manuel de Quesada y Loynaz, Francisco Javier Cisneros, Emilio Laurent Dubet and Fidel Castro (Cuba), the Uruguayans Juan Antonio Lavalleja and Manuel Oribe (Uruguay). The Venezuelans Narciso López (Cuba), Francisco de Miranda, Santiago Mariño, José Antonio Páez, Ezequiel Zamora, Juan Crisostomo Falcon, Juan Antonio Sotillo, Antonio Guzmán Blanco, Matias Salazar, Venancio Pulgar, Rafael Capó, Eduardo Pérez Albelo, Leon Colina, Joaquin Crespo, Rafael de Nogales Mendez, Nicolas Rolando, Miguel Antonio Matos, Gustavo Machado, Cipriano Castro, Rafael Garbiras Rangel, Juan Pablo Penaloza, Antonio Paredes, Rafael Simon Urbina, Emilio Arévalo Cedeño, Roman Delgado Chalbaud, Jose Maria Ortega Martinez, and Fernando Soto Rojas (Venezuela).

Although the American public often enjoyed reading about the thrilling adventures of mercenary filibusters, those Americans involved in filibustering expeditions were usually in violation of the first Neutrality Act of 1794 that made it illegal for a citizen to wage war against another country at peace with the United States. For example, the journalist John L. O'Sullivan (1813–1895), who coined the related phrase "manifest destiny" for the movement of American westward expansion, was put on trial for raising money in America for López's failed southern filibustering expedition in Cuba.

The second Neutrality Act of 1818 became of great frustration for American filibusters. Article 6 stated anyone engaged in filibustering could receive a maximum three years imprisonment and three thousand dollars in fines. However, it was not uncommon for in the early Republic of late 18th and early 19th century politicians to overlook and sometimes assist filibuster missions in the hopes to add to U.S. territory. This conflict meant the U.S. Army was reluctant to arrest filibusters who broke the terms of this legislation. Officers were worried that without permission from the American federal courts, such as the United States District Court to make these arrests, they could face arrest themselves.

=== Filibusters and the press ===
There was widespread support in the press for filibusters' missions. A number of journalists were sympathetic towards filibusters, such as John O'Sullivan and Moses S. Beach at the famous New York Sun and L. J. Sigur of the New Orleans Daily Delta. All supported Narciso López's missions to Cuba. John S. Thrasher contributed articles for the annexation of Cuba in the New Orleans Picayune. Some enterprising enthused journalists also enlisted themselves to fight for filibustering missions, such as Richardson Hardy and John McCann of the Cincinnati Nonpareil. The poet Theodore O'Hara was a member of William Walker's expedition to Nicaragua. He worked on the Kentucky Yeoman and the Democratic Rally newspapers. After this, he served in the Confederate States Army in the American Civil War (1861–1865).

However, filibustering was not universally praised in the press. Papers backing the Republican party's position of being anti-filibuster would use the term to denounce not just actors such as William Walker but also the abolitionist filibuster John Brown, who led a failed mission into Virginia with the aim of causing a slave revolt. Knowing it would harm their campaign, Republicans identified the actions of Brown as originating in the same lawless ideology as the Democrat endorsed Walker or the pro slavery factions operating in the Bleeding Kansas period, and hence inherently denounced his raid. Samuel Brannan's filibustering mission to Hawaii was identified by contemporary newspapers as being little more than a colonising scheme, although they refrained from passing moral judgement and the Daily Evening Picayune revised their opinion to the tamer 'emigrating company'.

Catholic newspapers had varying opinions on filibustering, but broadly denounced these missions for cultural hubris and violence. Despite criticisms of a 'mad spirit of aggression abroad', Catholic commentators often had more issue with the perceived moral decay domestically that filibusters represented, and could see potential in a Spanish Catholic revival abroad, even if it came as a consequence of violence.

== Antebellum United States ==
=== Early 19th century ===
There were a number of American filibusters in the early 19th century including (but not limited to) West Florida filibusters around Mobile, the Gutierrez-Magee Expedition, "plots against Pensacola in 1816, and multiple pushes into Texas.

=== Connection to slavery ===
The mid-nineteenth century (1848–1860) saw Southern planters raise private armies for expeditions to Mexico, the Caribbean, Central and South America to acquire territories that could be annexed to the Union as slave states. Despite not being authorized by their government, Southern elites often held considerable sway over U.S. foreign policy and national politics. Despite widespread opposition from Northerners, filibustering thrust slavery into American foreign policy.

Historians have noted that filibustering was not a common practice and was carried out by "the most radical proslavery expansionists". Hardline defenders of slavery saw its preservation as their "top priority", leading to support for filibusters and their campaigns abroad. At the height of filibustering, pro-slavery politicians wanted to expand the United States further into Latin America, as far as Paraguay and Peru. However, these attempts were quickly withdrawn when military and diplomatic retaliation was pursued.

The author and filibuster Horace Bell observed that it could be unpopular to be opposed to filibusterism, as being so "was to be opposed to African slavery".

On the abolitionist side, John Brown was accused by both Catholic and pro Republican newspapers of being a filibuster after leaving New York and heading to Virginia to lead the raid on Harpers Ferry. Comparisons were drawn between his actions and those of Walker, notably how both aimed to use violence to change the status of slavery (with Walker wanting to introduce slavery and Brown wanting to destroy it).

Many future Confederate officers and soldiers, such as Chatham Roberdeau Wheat, of the Louisiana Tigers, obtained valuable military experience from filibuster expeditions.

=== William Walker ===
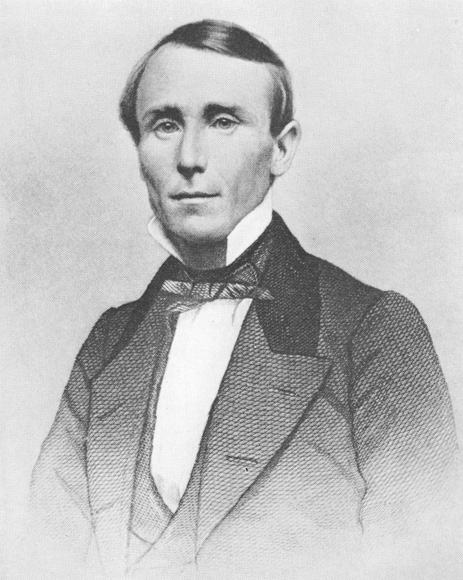
William Walker is a famous filibuster, having failed at multiple attempts to invade Latin American countries and establish a pro-slavery, American regime.

In the 1850s, American adventurer William Walker launched several filibustering campaigns leading a private mercenary army. In 1853, he declared a short-lived republic in the Mexican states of Sonora and Baja California. Later, when a path through Lake Nicaragua was being considered as the possible site of a canal through Central America (see Nicaragua canal), he was hired as a mercenary by one of the factions in a civil war in Nicaragua. He declared himself commander of the country's army in 1856; and soon afterward President of the Republic. Walker received no form of direct military or financial aid from the US government but in 1856 his government did receive official recognition from Democratic President Franklin Pierce. In June of the same year Walker was endorsed as an agent of Central America's regeneration by the Democratic National Convention's party platform. This support for Walker was later publicly retracted due to allegations of corruption but Walker's movement to many Democrats represented a natural outgrowth of the U.S. annexation of Texas, the Mexican–American War. After attempting to take control of the rest of Central America he was defeated by the four other Central American nations he tried to invade and eventually executed in 1860 by the local Honduran authorities he had tried to overthrow.

The author Horace Bell served as a major with Walker in Nicaragua in 1856. Colonel Parker H. French served as Minister of Hacienda and was appointed as Minister Plenipotentiary to Washington in 1855, but Pierce refused to recognise his credentials and did not meet with him. Rather than return to Nicaragua, French spent several months spending his spoils, enjoying a lavish lifestyle that included staying in luxury hotel suites and entertaining the press and politicians with cigars and champagne. Eventually French ran into legal troubles connected to recruiting volunteers for the Walker regime and he hastily returned to Nicaragua in March 1856.

In the traditional historiography in both the United States and Latin America, Walker's filibustering represented the high tide of antebellum American imperialism. His brief seizure of Nicaragua in 1855 is typically called a representative expression of manifest destiny with the added factor of trying to expand slavery into Central America. Historian Michel Gobat, however, presents a strongly revisionist interpretation. He argues that Walker was invited in by Nicaraguan liberals who were trying to force economic modernization and political liberalism, and that thus it was not an attempted projection of American power.

=== Masculinity and filibustering ===
Historians such as Gail Bederman and Amy Greenburg have noted the influence of masculinity of filibustering, particularly the form of "martial manhood" that many filibusterers adopted during the period. Many men in antebellum America sought a return to the type of masculinity displayed on the frontier – one supposedly of strength, violence and self reliance. Greenburg uses primary sources to examine the appeal to masculinity in the recruitment campaigns of filibuster missions, focusing on how the deteriorating working class conditions enabled locations such as Nicaragua to be advertised as a space for men to celebrate their strength.

Bederman, meanwhile, emphasises the importance of nostalgia for the American frontier, and draws together notions of race, masculinity and gender to display how people felt insecure in their identities so reverted to the typical ideal of what it meant to be a white man.

== Filibustering outside of the Americas ==
While typically associated with Latin America, South America and the Caribbean, historians such as Dominic Alessio have proposed examples of filibustering elsewhere. Emphasising the centrality of unauthorised individuals in filibustering, the actions of Gabriel D'Annuzio in Fiume, Adel Aubert du Petit-Thouars in Tahiti and Giuseppe Garibaldi in Italy were suggested as non-American filibusters. Indeed, some contemporary American newspapers styled the actions of Garibaldi and his insurgents in pre-unification Italy as filibustering.

It ought to be emphasised, however, that filibustering was predominantly used to refer to mid 19th century missions contained within the Americas, and that applying the term outside of this context risks being anachronistic.

== Women's involvement with filibustering ==
Women often participated in filibustering, taking active roles such as planning, propaganda, participation, and popularization. Women also composed songs, arranged balls and concerts on behalf of the filibusters. Most of the interest came from women in the Gulf and Mid-Atlantic states as they were closer to the events. Correspondingly those in the Northern states tended not to take much interest in what was going on further south. Many women attended the filibuster expeditions as settlers, to help with casualties and to aid the expeditions in any way they could. Many women were at the front line experiencing first hand the armed engagements. A few even took up arms and used them to defend their men and property.

Jane McManus Storm Cazneau had an important role in negotiating between filibusters and U.S. politicians. She persuaded Moses S. Beach to promote lectures about William Walker and his group. All of these women embraced the idea of expansionism to spread American slavery in Central and South America. John Quitman's daughter Louisa used anti-Spanish rhetoric as she saw fit so that the Spanish deserved to be punished for what they had done to Narciso López and his men after they had been taken prisoner.

== Filibusters and freemasonry ==
Several well-known figures in filibusterism were also Freemasons and this organization played a major role within the hierarchy of the filibusters. Narciso López and Ambrosio José Gonzales of the Cuban expedition were both Freemasons. Other Freemasons who took part in filibustering came from Louisiana and were involved with the 1810 incursion into West Florida. Later in 1836 Freemasons were involved in the Texas Revolution. These included Stephen F. Austin, Mirabeau Buonaparte Lamar, and David Crockett among others. Freemasons from New Orleans had helped in planning the conquest of Texas. Several lodges were an important element of the filibusters, contributing many men to the cause of expansionism. Part of the Masonic emphasis was that members should support their country's freedoms.

During the period when Narciso López was planning his expedition to Cuba the Havana Club, founded in 1848 by Cuban Freemasons, had endorsed the idea of inviting a filibuster expedition to Cuba to overthrow the colonial Spanish and free the island. The flag that López and others designed for their expedition had masonic emblems built into it. These included representations of the Mason's triangular apron. The Star of Texas was included to represent the five points of the fellowship of the Masons. This flag was adopted as the Cuban national flag fifty-two years after López's failed adventure.

Other filibustering Freemasons of note included Chatham Roberdeau Wheat and Theodore O'Hara the poet. They came from an extensive network of lodges in the Southern U.S. such as Solomon's Lodge No. 20 in Jacksonville and Marion Lodge No. 19 in Ocala. The reach of the Masons was wide and helpful. On arriving at John Hardee Dilworth's estate, Ambrosio Jose Gonzales used Freemasonry symbols, which prevented him from being arrested as Dilworth was also a Mason and had been told by presidential order to arrest Gonzales.

== "Major F. P. Hann" hoax ==
The Frank Hann letters were a series of hoax letters published in 1895, purported to be written by a "Major F. P. Hann", who claimed to be an American filibuster fighting against the Spanish colonial rule of Cuba. Hann wrote a fake account of his supposed experiences in the Cuban War of Independence, detailing accounts of battles and operations that took place as well as commenting on the political situation within the country.

The real Frank Hann, a twenty-year-old man who lived in Gainesville, Florida, used the pseudonym "Anderfer" to release the letters he forged, acting as a medium for the letters written by "Major Hann". He used the hoax to raise his own profile in the U.S. as a war hero, while also attempting to garner support for filibuster missions in Cuba.

The episode draws attention to the influence of the media and yellow journalism on American sentiment towards foreign affairs during the period.

== In popular culture ==
William Walker's filibusters are the subject of a poem by Ernesto Cardenal. John Neal's 1859 novel True Womanhood includes a character who travels from the US to Nicaragua to aid Walker's campaign. Other media portrayals of filibustering include: Richard Harding Davis novels, the 1987 film Walker by Alex Cox, Blood Meridian by Cormac McCarthy, Ned Buntline's novels The B'hoys of New York and The Mysteries and Miseries of New Orleans, and Lucy Petway Holcombe's The Free Flag of Cuba. Season 1 episode 8 of The High Chaparral is titled "The Filibusteros" and depicts a fictional group of post–Civil War Confederate soldiers in Mexico.

Historians such as Aims McGuinness promote the view that filibustering catalysed an opposition discourse that manifest destiny had spawned. In doing so this discourse in addition to the trauma and collective memory of the Filibuster War (caused by events such as the burning of Granada) is theorised to have created the original sense of widespread Latin American identity and Costa Rican national identity.

== See also ==
- Crabb massacre
- Philip Nolan
- British Legions
- Burr conspiracy
- El filibusterismo
- Foreign Enlistment Act 1870 (UK)
- Heimosodat
- Hunters' Lodges
- Kingdom of Sedang
- Knights of the Golden Circle
- Raj of Sarawak
- Vikings
- Paulet affair
- Overthrow of the Hawaiian Kingdom
