= 1851 =

1851 in various calendars
- Gregorian calendar: 1851; MDCCCLI
- Ab urbe condita: 2604
- Armenian calendar: 1300; ԹՎ ՌՅ
- Assyrian calendar: 6601
- Baháʼí calendar: 7–8
- Balinese saka calendar: 1772–1773
- Bengali calendar: 1257–1258
- Berber calendar: 2801
- British Regnal year: 14 Vict. 1 – 15 Vict. 1
- Buddhist calendar: 2395
- Burmese calendar: 1213
- Byzantine calendar: 7359–7360
- Chinese calendar: 庚戌年 (Metal Dog); 4548 or 4341 — to — 辛亥年 (Metal Pig); 4549 or 4342
- Coptic calendar: 1567–1568
- Discordian calendar: 3017
- Ethiopian calendar: 1843–1844
- Hebrew calendar: 5611–5612
- Hindu calendars
- Vikram Samvat: 1907–1908
- Shaka Samvat: 1772–1773
- Kali Yuga: 4951–4952
- Holocene calendar: 11851
- Igbo calendar: 851–852
- Iranian calendar: 1229–1230
- Islamic calendar: 1267–1268
- Japanese calendar: Kaei 4 (嘉永４年)
- Javanese calendar: 1779–1780
- Julian calendar: Gregorian minus 12 days
- Korean calendar: 4184
- Minguo calendar: 61 before ROC 民前61年
- Nanakshahi calendar: 383
- Thai solar calendar: 2393–2394
- Tibetan calendar: ལྕགས་ཕོ་ཁྱི་ལོ་ (male Iron-Dog); 1977 or 1596 or 824 — to — ལྕགས་མོ་ཕག་ལོ་ (female Iron-Boar); 1978 or 1597 or 825

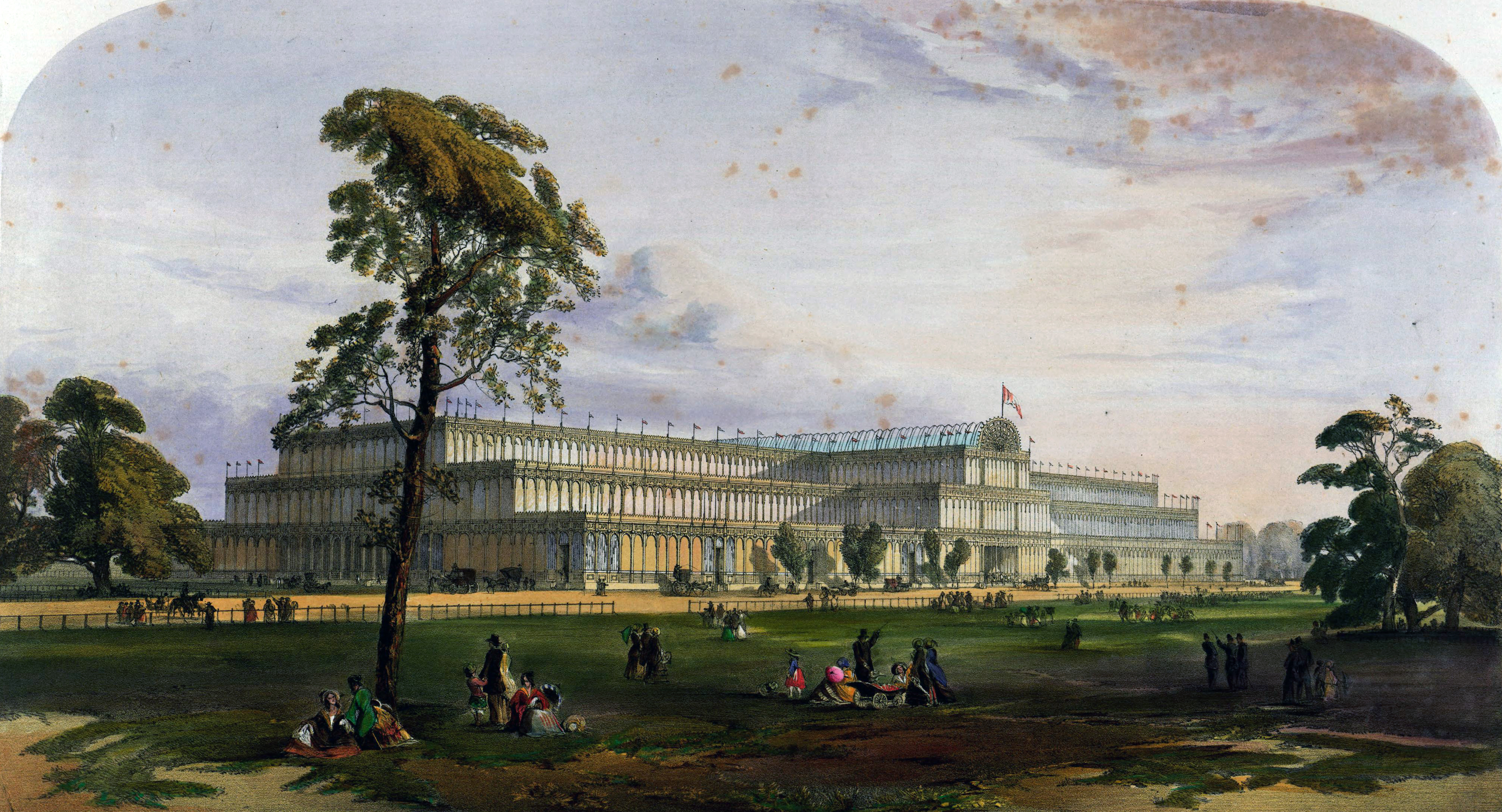
May 1: The Great Exhibition of 1851 opens in London.

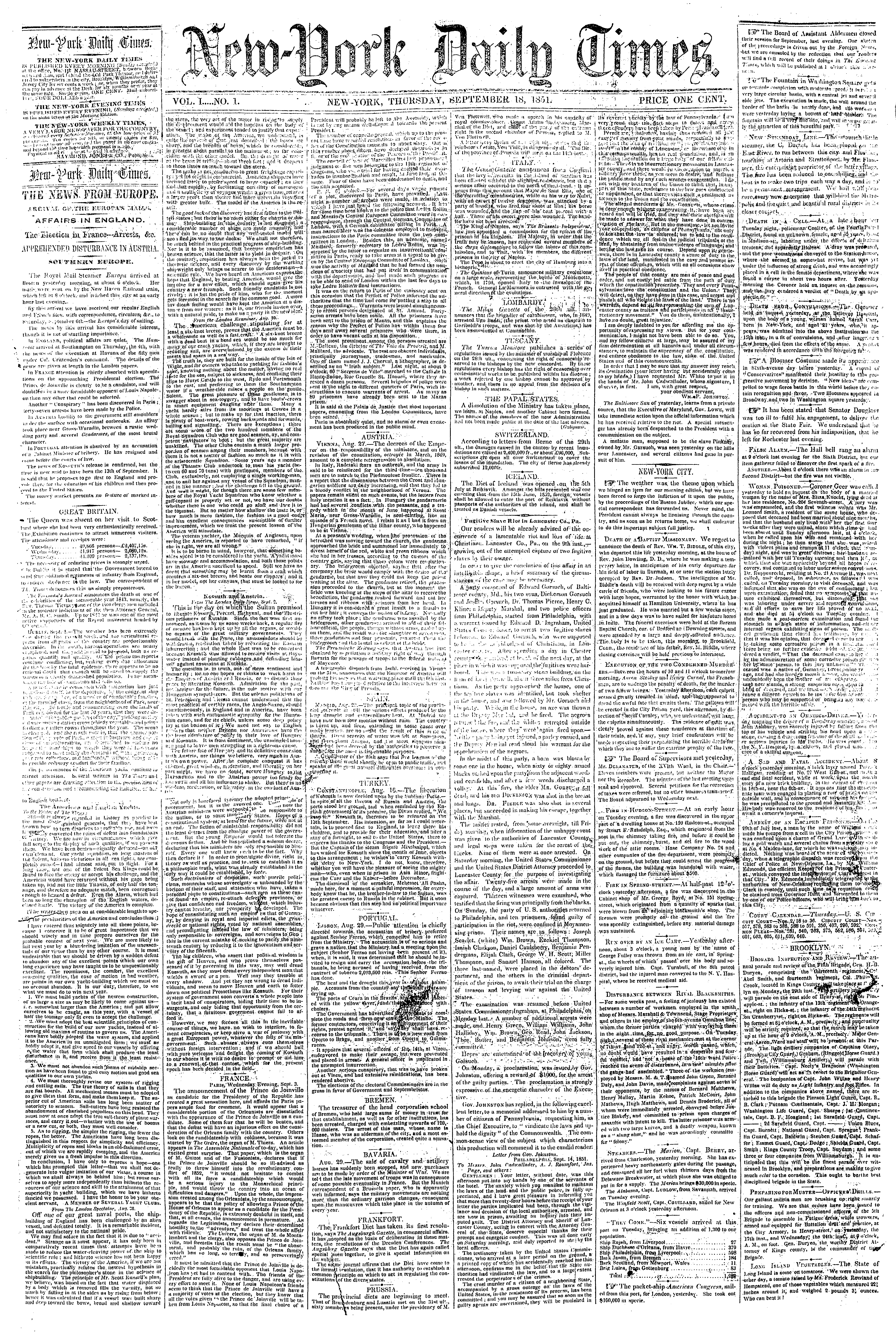
September 18: The New York Times publishes its first issue

1851 (MDCCCLI) was a common year starting on Wednesday of the Gregorian calendar and a common year starting on Monday of the Julian calendar, the 1851st year of the Common Era (CE) and Anno Domini (AD) designations, the 851st year of the 2nd millennium, the 51st year of the 19th century, and the 2nd year of the 1850s decade. As of the start of 1851, the Gregorian calendar was 12 days ahead of the Julian calendar, which remained in localized use until 1923.

== Events ==
=== January–March ===
- January 11 – Hong Xiuquan officially begins the Taiping Rebellion in China, one of the bloodiest revolts that would lead to 20 million deaths.
- January 15 – Christian Female College, modern-day Columbia College, receives its charter from the Missouri General Assembly.
- January 23 – The flip of a coin, subsequently named the Portland Penny, determines whether a new city in the Oregon Territory will be named after Boston, Massachusetts, or Portland, Maine, with Portland winning.
- January 28 – Northwestern University is founded in Illinois.
- February 1 – Brandtaucher, the oldest surviving submersible craft, sinks during acceptance trials in the German port of Kiel, but the designer, Wilhelm Bauer, and the two crew escape successfully.
- February 6 – Black Thursday occurs in Australia as bushfires sweep across the state of Victoria, burning about a quarter of its area.
- February 12 – Edward Hargraves claims to have found gold in Australia.
- February 15 – In Boston, Massachusetts, members of the anti-slavery Boston Vigilance Committee rescue fugitive slave Shadrach Minkins from a courtroom, following his arrest by U.S. marshals.
- March 1 – Victor Hugo uses the phrase United States of Europe, in a speech to the French National Assembly.
- March 11 – Giuseppe Verdi's opera Rigoletto is first performed at La Fenice in Venice.
- March 27 – The first European men reportedly see Yosemite Valley.
- March 30 – A United Kingdom Census is taken. The population has reached 21 million. 6.3 million live in cities of 20,000 or more in England and Wales, and cities of 20,000 or more account for 35% of the total English population. It also shows that a legacy of the Great Irish Famine is that the population of Ireland has fallen to 6,575,000 – a drop of 1,600,000 in ten years, many having emigrated.

=== April–June ===
- April 8 – Western Union is founded, as the New York and Mississippi Valley Printing Telegraph Company.
- April 9 – San Luis, the oldest permanent settlement in the state of Colorado, is founded by settlers from Taos, New Mexico.
- April 20 – Ramón Castilla loses power in Peru.
- April 23 – Anne Darwin, daughter of Charles Darwin dies, sending him into a great depression.
- April 25 – Placer County, California, is formed from parts of Sutter and Yuba Counties with Auburn as the county seat.
- April 28 – Santa Clara College is chartered in Santa Clara, California.
- May 1 – The Great Exhibition of the Works of Industry of All Nations in the Crystal Palace, Hyde Park, London is opened by Queen Victoria.
- May 15
  - The first Australian gold rush is proclaimed, although the discovery had been made three months earlier.
  - Alpha Delta Pi sorority, the first secret society for women, is founded at Wesleyan College in Macon, Georgia (U.S.)
  - Mongkut is crowned as King (Rama IV) of Siam, at the Grand Palace in Bangkok.

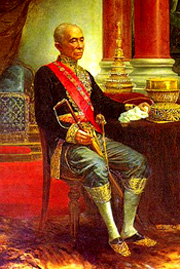
May 15: Rama IV is crowned as the King of Siam.

- Mid-May to mid-July – Great Flood of 1851: Extensive flooding sweeps across the Midwestern United States. The town of Des Moines is virtually washed away, and many rainfall records hold for 160 years.
- June 2
  - Maine passes the Maine Liquor Law, the first state-wide prohibition in the United States.
  - Castle & Cooke, the predecessor of Dole Food Company, is founded in Hawaii.
- June 21 – The Immortal Game, a famous chess match, is played between Adolf Anderssen and Lionel Kieseritzky, during a break in the first international tournament, held in London.

=== July–September ===
- July 1
  - Port Phillip District separates from New South Wales to become the Colony of Victoria (Australia).
  - Serial poisoner Hélène Jégado is arrested in Rennes, France. Her trial opens on December 6; she is eventually sentenced to death and executed by guillotine.
  - Battle of Ras Tanoura, a collision occurs between the Bahrain blockading force off Kateef and the Arab fugitives at Kenn Island, who surprised and attacked the Bahrain fleet. Mubarak bin Abdulla bin Ahmed, along with his brother Rashid and Busher bin Rahma Al Jalahma were all killed in the battle.
- July 10 – The University of the Pacific is chartered as California Wesleyan College, in Santa Clara, California.
- July 28 – Total solar eclipse visible in Canada, Greenland, Iceland and Northern Europe, the first solar eclipse to be photographed.
- July 29 – Annibale de Gasparis, in Naples, Italy discovers asteroid 15 Eunomia.
- August 1 – Virginia closes its Reform Constitutional Convention, deciding that all white men have the right to vote.
- August 3 – The filibustering Lopez Expedition sails from New Orleans, Louisiana heading to seize Spanish-ruled Cuba.
- August 12 – Isaac Singer is granted a United States patent for his improved sewing machine.
- August 22 – The yacht America wins the first America's Cup race, off the coast of England.
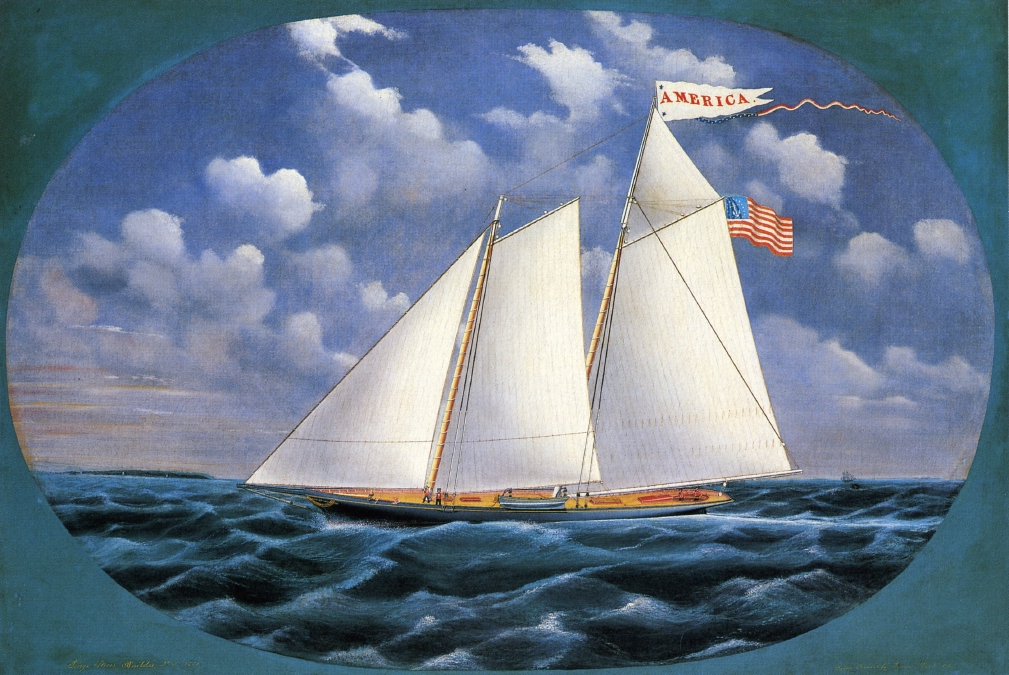
  August 22: The yacht America, winner of the first America's Cup
- September 1 – Narciso López is executed in Havana following the failure of his expedition in Cuba.
- September 15 – Saint Joseph's University is founded in Philadelphia.
- September 18 – The New York Times is founded in New York City.
- September 30 – HSwMS Eugenie leaves from Karlskrona, Sweden to begin its voyage as the first Swedish Royal Navy vessel to circumnavigate the world.

=== October–December ===
- October 15
  - The city of Winona, Minnesota is founded.
  - The Great Exhibition in London closes.
- October 17 – The first Parsi-Muslim riot begins in Bombay, India.
- October 24 – Ariel and Umbriel, moons of Uranus, are discovered by William Lassell.
- October – The Reuters news service is founded in London
- November 1 – Saint Petersburg–Moscow Railway officially opens in Russia.
- November 13
  - The Denny Party lands at Alki Point, the first settlers of what later becomes Seattle.
  - The first protected submarine telegraph cable is laid, across the English Channel.
- November 14 – Herman Melville's novel Moby-Dick; or The Whale is published in the U.S. by Harper & Brothers, New York, after being first published on October 18 in London, by Richard Bentley, in three volumes as The Whale.
- November 21 – Mutineers take control of the Chilean penal colony of Punta Arenas in the Strait of Magellan.
- November 26–27 – Morocco: French naval forces bombard the Moroccan city of Salé, in retaliation for looting of a French cargo ship.
- December 2 – In what amounts to a coup d'etat, President Louis-Napoleon Bonaparte of France dissolves the French National Assembly, and declares a new constitution to extend his term. A year later he declares himself as Emperor Napoleon III, ending the Second Republic.
- December 9 – The first YMCA in North America is established in Montreal.
- December 22 – The first railway begins operation in India, hauling canal construction material in Roorkee.
- December 24 – The Library of Congress in Washington, D.C., burns.
- December 26–27 – A British Royal Navy warship bombards Lagos Island; Oba Kosoko is wounded, and flees to Epe.
- December 29 – The first YMCA in the United States opens in Boston, Massachusetts.
- December 31 – 1851 Chilean Revolution: At the Battle of Loncomilla, Chilean rebels are defeated, ending the revolution.

=== Ongoing ===
- 1851–1855 Yellow River floods in China.
- Nian Rebellion in China, 1851–68.
- Naga raids on the East India Company, 1851–65.
- Great Famine (Ireland), 1845–52.

== Births ==
=== January–June ===
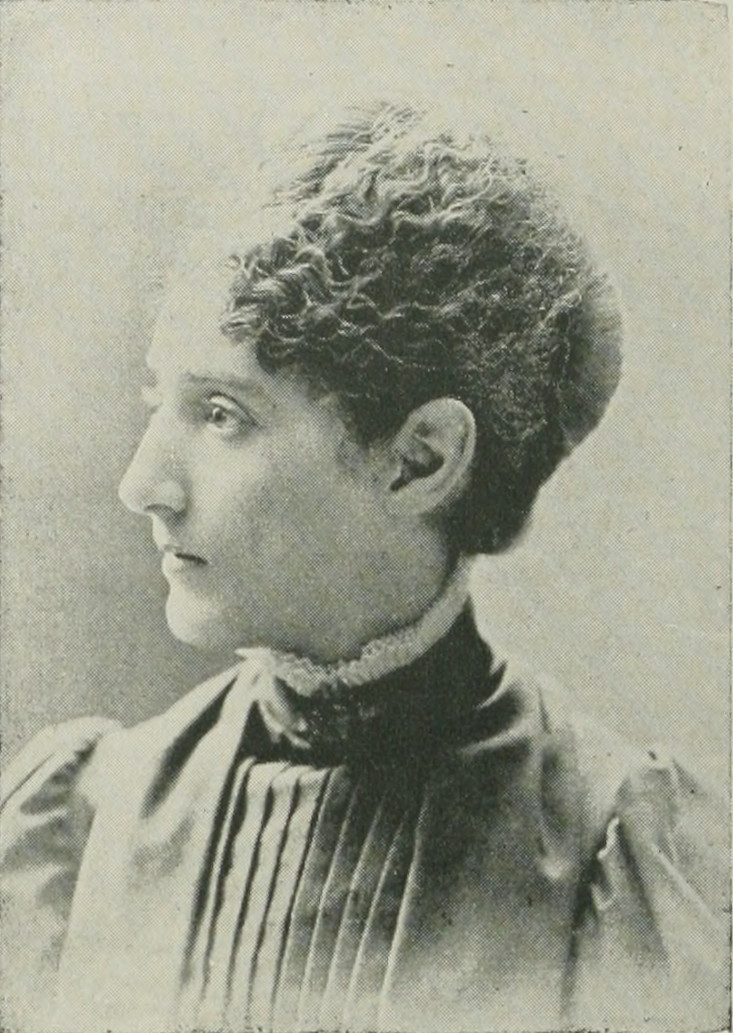
Ella Giles Ruddy

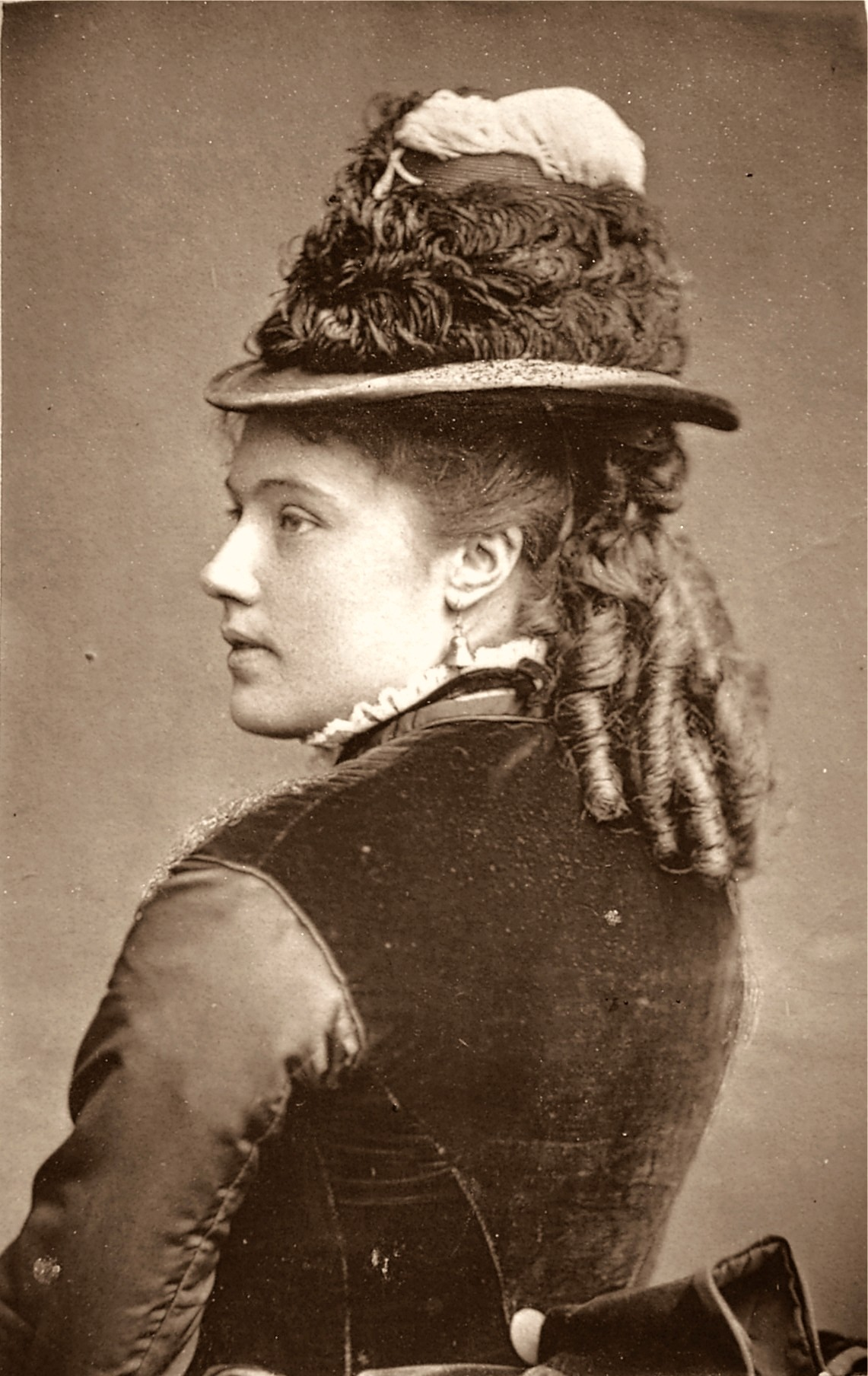
Rose Coghlan, 1870s

- January 9 – Rudolf von Brudermann, Austro-Hungarian general (d. 1941)
- January 11 – Soeria Atmadja, Sundanese noble and politician, Regent of Sumedang (1881 - 1919) (d. 1921)
- January 16 – William Hall-Jones, English-New Zealand politician, 16th Prime Minister of New Zealand (d. 1936)
- January 17 – A. B. Frost, American illustrator (d. 1928)
- January 19
  - David Starr Jordan, American ichthyologist, educator, eugenicist, and peace activist (d. 1931)
  - Jacobus Kapteyn, Dutch astronomer (d. 1922)
- January 21 – Pietro Frugoni, Italian general (d. 1940)
- February 2 – Ella Giles Ruddy, American author and essayist (d. 1917)
- February 13 – Joseph B. Murdock, United States Navy admiral, New Hampshire politician (d. 1931)
- February 15 – Antero Rubín, Spanish general, politician (d. 1935)
- February 23 – Frederick Warde, English actor (d. 1935)
- March 14 – John Sebastian Little, American politician, congressman (d. 1916)
- March 18
  - Rose Coghlan, English actress (d. 1932)
  - Julien Dupré, French artist (d. 1910)
- March 19
  - Pierre Ruffey, French general (d. 1928)
  - William Henry Stark, American business leader (d. 1936)
- March 24 – Friedrich von Scholtz, German general (d. 1927)
- March 27 – Vincent d'Indy, French composer, teacher (d. 1931)
- March 28 – Bernardino Machado, Portuguese President (d. 1944)
- March 31 – Francis Bell, 20th Prime Minister of New Zealand (d. 1936)
- April 1 – Bruno von Mudra, German general (d. 1931)
- April 4 – James Campbell, 1st Baron Glenavy, Irish lawyer, politician (d. 1931)
- April 13
  - Robert Abbe, American surgeon (d. 1928)
  - Helen M. Winslow, American editor, author, and publisher (d. 1938)
- April 15 – Auguste Dubail, French general (d. 1934)
- April 20 – Young Tom Morris, Scottish golfer (d. 1875)
- April 21
  - Charles Barrois, French geologist (d. 1939)
  - Rosa Kerschbaumer-Putjata, Russian ophthalmologist, Austria's first female doctor(d. 1923)
- May 6 – Aristide Bruant, French cabaret singer, comedian (d. 1925)
- May 7 – Adolf von Harnack, German Lutheran theologian, church historian (d. 1930)
- May 11 – Madre Teresa Nuzzo, Maltese nun, foundress of the Daughters of the Sacred Heart (d. 1923)
- May 14 – Anna Laurens Dawes, American author, suffragist (d. 1938)
- May 15 – Lillian Resler Keister Harford, American church organizer, editor (d. 1935)

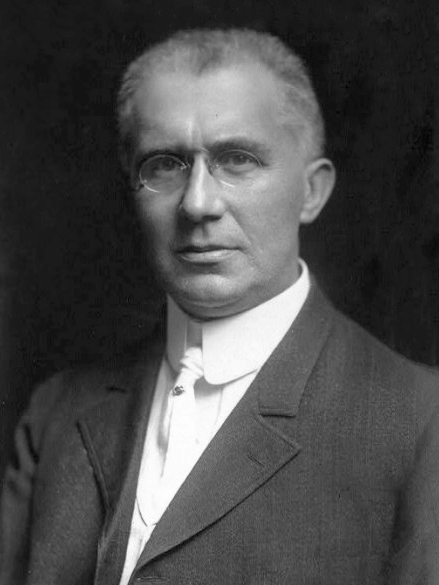
Emile Berliner

- May 18 – Simon Kahquados, Potawatomi political activist (d. 1930)
- May 20 – Emile Berliner, German-born American telephone and recording pioneer (d. 1929)
- May 21 – Léon Bourgeois, French statesman, recipient of the Nobel Peace Prize (d. 1925)
- June 7 – Ture Malmgren, Swedish journalist, politician (d. 1922)
- June 12 – Sir Oliver Lodge, British physicist (d. 1940)
- June 13 – Anton Haus, Austro-Hungarian admiral (d. 1917)
- June 16 – Georg Jellinek, Austrian legal philosopher (d. 1911)

=== July–December ===
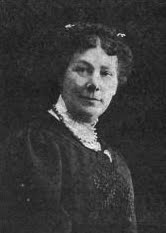
Dora Montefiore

- July 5 – Hannibal di Francia, Italian priest, saint (d. 1927)
- July 8 – Arthur Evans, British archaeologist (d. 1941)
- July 15 – Eduardo Gutiérrez, Argentinian author (d. 1889)
- July 20 – Arnold Pick, Czech-German neurologist, psychiatrist (d. 1924)
- July 21 – Sam Bass, American outlaw (d. 1878)
- August 3 – Nikolai Iudovich Ivanov, Russian general (d. 1919)
- August 14 – Doc Holliday, American gambler, gunfighter (d. 1887)
- August 31 – Stefania Wolicka, Polish historian (d. 1937)
- September 1 – Carl Kellner, Austrian mystic (d. 1905)
- September 7 – David King Udall, American politician (d. 1938)
- September 13 – Walter Reed, American army physician, bacteriologist (d. 1902)
- September 16 – Evgeny Aleksandrovich Radkevich, Russian general (d. 1930)
- September 21 – Arthur Schuster, German-British physicist (d. 1934)
- September 29 – Hardwicke Rawnsley, English clergyman, poet, writer of hymns and conservationist (d. 1920)
- October 2 – Ferdinand Foch, French commander of Allied forces in World War I (d. 1929)
- October 5 – Thomas Pollock Anshutz, American painter, educator (d. 1912)
- October 20 – George Gandy, American entrepreneur (d. 1946)
- November 5 – Charles Dupuy, 3-time prime minister of France (d. 1923)
- November 10 – José Maria de Yermo y Parres, Mexican Roman Catholic priest and saint (d. 1904)
- November 13 – Klemens Bachleda, Polish Tatra guide and mountain rescuer (d. 1910)
- November 16 – William Elbridge Sewell, American naval officer, Governor of Guam (d. 1904)
- November 27 – Friedrich Sixt von Armin, German general (d. 1936)
- December 10 – Melvil Dewey, American librarian, inventor of Dewey Decimal Classification (d. 1931)
- December 20 – Dora Montefiore, English suffragist, socialist (d. 1933)
- December 24 – Noël Édouard, vicomte de Curières de Castelnau, French general (d. 1944)
- December 30 – Asa Griggs Candler, American businessman, politician (d. 1929)

== Deaths ==
=== January–June ===
Mary Shelley

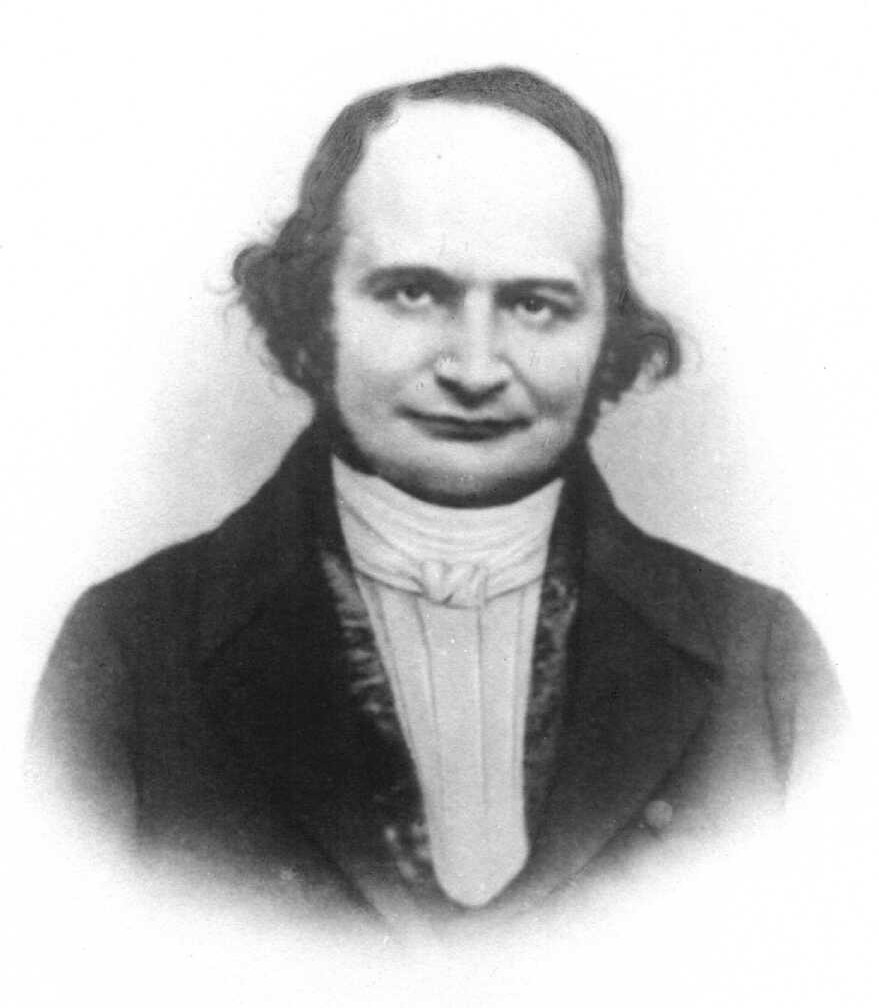
Carl Gustav Jacob Jacobi

- January 10 – Karl Freiherr von Müffling, Prussian field marshal (b. 1775)
- January 19 – Esteban Echeverría, Argentine poet, writer (b. 1805)
- January 21 – Albert Lortzing, German composer (b. 1801)
- January 23 – Archibald Primrose, Lord Dalmeny, Scottish politician (b. 1809)
- January 27 – John James Audubon, French-American naturalist, illustrator (b. 1785)
- January 31 – David Spangler Kaufman, Congressman from Texas (b. 1813)
- February 1 – Mary Shelley, English author (b. 1797)
- February 3 – Benjamin Williams Crowninshield, Congressman from Massachusetts, secretary of U.S. Navy (b. 1772)
- February 18 – Carl Gustav Jacob Jacobi, German mathematician (b. 1804)
- February 23 – Joanna Baillie, Scottish poet, dramatist (b. 1762)
- February 28 – Guillaume Dode de la Brunerie, Marshal of France (b. 1775)
- March 4 – Henry Smith, Texas governor (b. 1788)
- March 9 – Hans Christian Ørsted, Danish scientist (b. 1777)
- April 2 – Nangklao (Rama III), King of Siam (Thailand) (b. 1788)
- April 15 – Andrés Quintana Roo, Mexican politician and lawyer, husband of Leona Vicario (b. 1787)
- April 25 – Mor Sæther, Norwegian herbalist (b. 1793)
- May 13 – Princess Augusta of Bavaria, Duchess of Leuchtenberg (b. 1788)
- May 14 – Manuel Gómez Pedraza, 6th President of Mexico, 1832-1833 (b. 1789)
- May 22 – Mordecai Manuel Noah, American writer, journalist (b. 1785)
- June 9 – John Brown Russwurm, Americo-Liberian journalist and governor of the African Republic of Maryland (b. 1799)
- June 10 – Robert Dundas, 2nd Viscount Melville, British politician (b. 1771)

=== July–December ===
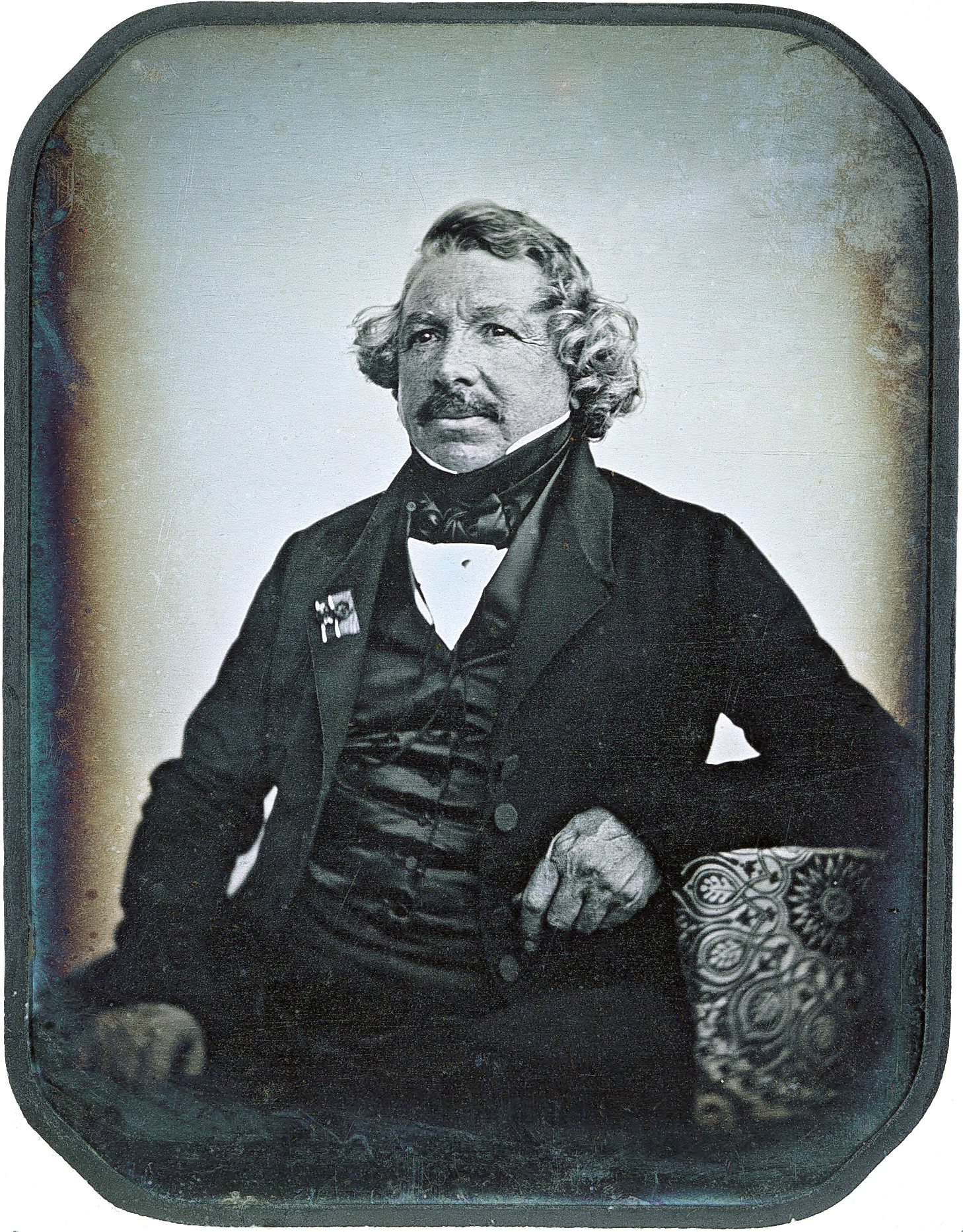
Louis Daguerre

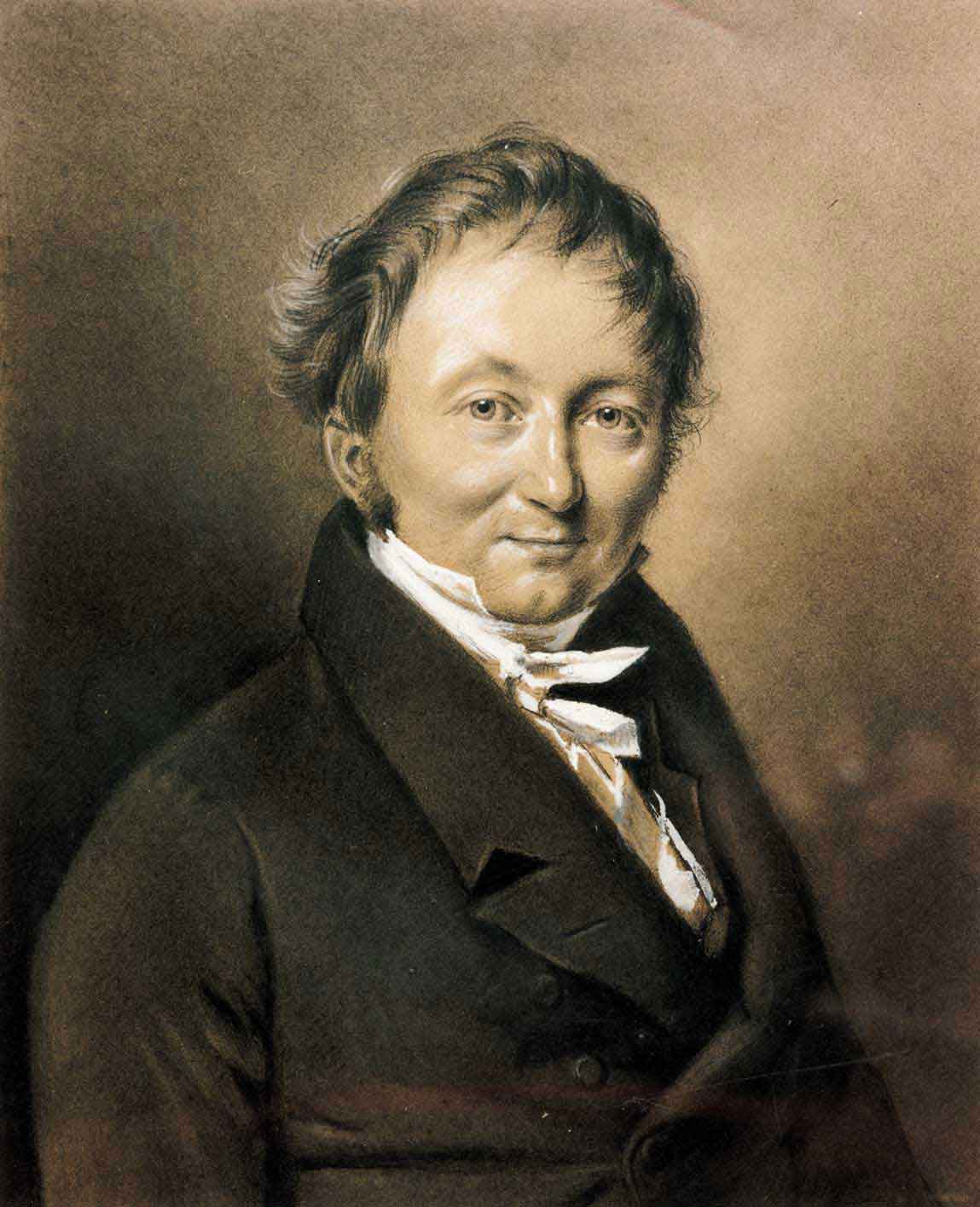
Karl Drais

- July 10 – Louis Daguerre, French artist, chemist (b. 1787)
- July 17 – Roger Sheaffe, British general (b. 1763)
- August 8 – James Broadwood, English piano manufacturer (b. 1772)
- August 24 – James McDowell, American politician (b. 1795)
- September 10 – Thomas Hopkins Gallaudet, American educator (b. 1787)
- September 11 – Sylvester Graham, American nutritionist, inventor (b. 1794)
- September 14 – James Fenimore Cooper, American writer (b. 1789)
- October 4 – Manuel Godoy, Spanish statesman (b. 1767)
- October 19 – Madame Royale Marie Thérèse of France (b. 1778)
- October 25 – Giorgio Pullicino, Maltese painter, and architect (b. 1779)
- October 31 – Petar II Petrović-Njegoš, Montenegrin statesman, religious leader and poet (b. 1813)
- November 26 – Jean-de-Dieu Soult, French marshal, politician (b. 1769)
- December 9 – William Thornhill, British Army officer (b. 1768)
- December 19
  - J. M. W. Turner, English painter (b. 1775)
  - Karl Drais, German inventor (b. 1785)

=== Date unknown ===
- Gustafva Lindskog, Swedish athlete (b. 1794)
