= Joaquín de Agüero =

Cuban revolutionary (1816–1851)

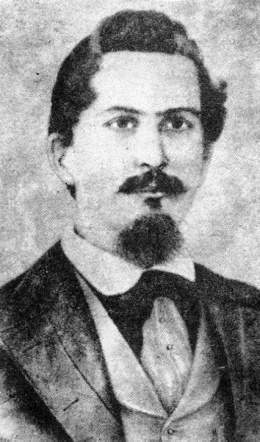
- Born: 15 November 1816; Puerto Príncipe, Captaincy General of Cuba, Spanish Empire
- Died: 12 August 1851 (aged 34); Puerto Príncipe, Cuba
- Cause of death: Execution by firing squad
- Occupation: Lawyer
- Known for: emancipation, liberation
- Relatives: Martina Pierra de Poo (niece)

Joaquín de Agüero (15 November 1816 – 12 August 1851) was a Cuban revolutionary. In 1843, he freed all his slaves. In 1851, he headed an insurrection against the Spanish government, in the central part of the island coinciding with the filibustering Lopez Expedition. After a desperate contest, he was defeated in battle, captured, and shot, together with his main followers.

== Biography ==
Joaquín de Agüero studied law in the city of Havana, but returned home as soon as he received notice that his father had become terminally ill. After his father's death, he inherited his father's land and slaves. A notably generous man, he established a free public school for underprivileged children in the small town of Guáimaro, 70 km (43 mi) southeast of Puerto Príncipe. The site of that school was selected in 1869 as the venue for the drafting and approval of Cuba's first Constitution as a free country, the Constitution of Guáimaro.

== Independence struggle ==
Joaquín de Agüero freed his slaves in 1843, and gave each of them a plot of land so they could make a living. This action caused great alarm among the Spanish authorities, as well as among many of the area's large plantation owners. Despite the usual public outcry to abolish slavery, Agüero's action was an illegal act, and to escape legal inquiries, he was forced to leave Cuba with his family for the United States; however, the immense love he felt for his homeland brought him back within three months.

After his return, Agüero stayed in his farm "El Redentor", near the town of Guáimaro, while actively participating in clandestine independence movements against Spanish rule. By 1849 he had become a key figure in the "La Sociedad Libertadora de Puerto Príncipe", involving himself in armed revolt against the ruling government. The liberation group he led publicly denounced Spanish rule and demanded independence. With only forty men in his force, they were quickly defeated by Spanish troops. Agüero was arrested en route to Puerto Príncipe while trying to flee to the United States. His armed revolt had failed miserably, but as historian Cento Gomez stated, "it was a ground breaking event in the history of Cuban struggle for independence." On August 12, 1851, he was shot by a firing squad of Spanish troops alongside three of his compatriots including José Tomás Betancourt in Puerto Príncipe (today's Camagüey province).

Years later Cuba did achieve independence from Spanish rule, and to honor Agüero's dedication to the Cuban cause of freedom, after the conclusion of the Cuban War of Independence (1895–1898), several public places and buildings were named after him. Even fast food restaurants have their billboards have the name Joaquín de Agüero emblazoned on their billboards.

== Independence conspiracy and execution ==
As a consequence of the local anti-colonial tradition, and continental influences, he took up arms and left for the manigua (relatively inaccessible fields and mountains), compromising his social position and economic privileged, to fight against the Colonial Spanish America.

He presided over the "Liberating Society of Puerto Príncipe". Printed pamphlets against the colonial government. Despite gathering several rebel groups around him, the lack of organization and little military knowledge turned against them. What they counted on, led them to fail in all their actions, as was the case with the attempted capture of the City of Las Tunas, some 130 km southeast of Camagüey.

As a result of the intense persecution by the Spanish troops, he decides to try to flee to the United States. He, nevertheless, is betrayed, captured and tortured on the way back to the city of Puerto Príncipe (Camagüey). There he is sentenced to the penalty of garrote but the executioner was poisoned, He was shot in the company of three of his companions. on August 12, 1851 in what was then called Sabana de Méndez, today plaza It bears his name, This is located at the end of Avenida de los Mártires, in the north of the city of Camagüey.

== Legacy ==
The city of Port-au-Prince, after the death of this hero, fell into a general mourning. It is said that the houses were left empty as everyone went to their properties in the countryside as a protest for their three fallen companions: Tomás Betancourt, Fernando de Zayas and Miguel Benavides.

Sometime later, in the former Plaza de Armas, today Parque Ignacio Agramonte, four royal palms were planted to honor Joaquín de Agüero. This was done quietly and discreetly, as any attempt to build monuments for those seeking independence for Camagüey was prohibited.

Even it is said that the young local women were offended if they were mistaken with Spanish. Therefore, they wore specific symbols on their clothes and headdresses to identify themselves as Creoles and patriots.

There is a story not proven at all, but that qualifies the respect that the locals had for their martyr of independence and the degree of identification that this ancestor had with political and military history in the fight against Spain. This follows that Ignacio Agramonte, the leader of Camagüey of the first Cuban war of independence of the Ten Years’ war and a national patriotic symbol for the people of Camagüey today, as a teenager he dipped his handkerchief in the blood of Joaquín de Agüero de Agüero and swore in front of his corpse to finish the work for which those patriots gave their lives.

== Tributes ==
Today his name honors a district within the city, an important street in the "La Vigía" neighborhood, a primary school, a plaza, etc. His name, work and memory are part of the intangible legacy of the city and marks as a symbol for it.

== See also ==
- Martina Pierra de Poo
