= Martina Pierra de Poo =

Cuban poet, actress and revolutionary (1833–1900)

Doña Martina Pierra de Poo
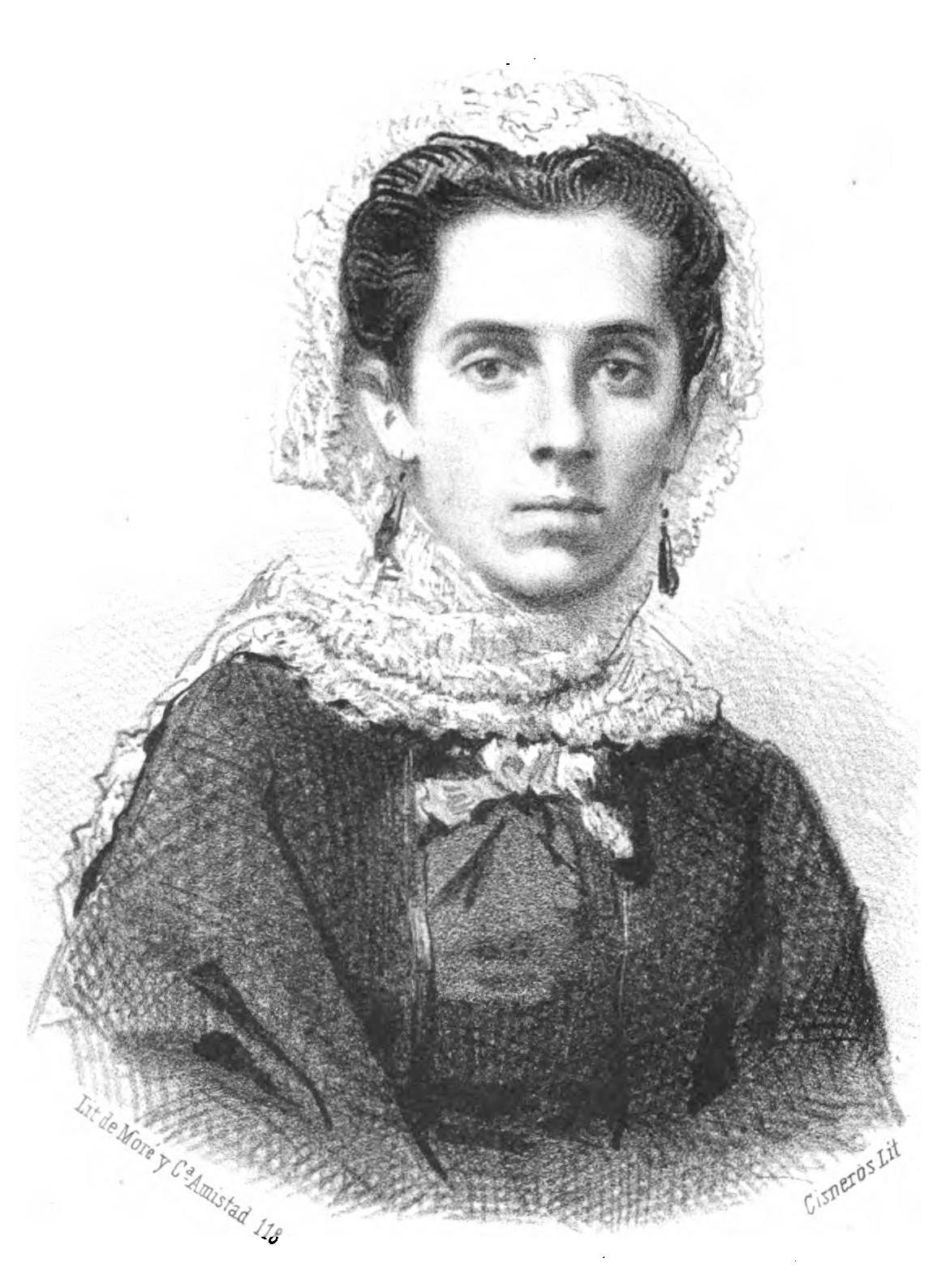
- Sketch of Pierra de Poo, 1868
- Born: María Martina de Pierra y Agüero; 8 February 1833; Camagüey, Cuba, Spanish Empire
- Died: 31 May 1900 (aged 67); Havana, Cuba
- Occupations: Poet, actress, revolutionary
- Spouse: José Desiderio de Poo y Álvarez (m. 1861; died 1898)
- Children: 5
- Relatives: Joaquín de Agüero (uncle)
- Writing career
- Language: Spanish

María Martina de Pierra y Agüero (1833–1900), commonly known by her nom de plume Martina Pierra de Poo, was a Cuban poet, actress and revolutionary.

== Biography ==
María Martina de Pierra y Agüero was born in Camagüey on 8 February 1833, the daughter of Simón Joseph de Pierra y Ruiz del Canto, an infantry lieutenant in the Spanish Army, and María Francisca del Rosario de Agüero y Arteaga. At the age of eleven, she wrote her first verses, and at fifteen she published her first poem Una Noche de Luna in the newspaper El Fanal de Puerto-Príncipe.

Shortly before July 1851, she sent the sonnet A los Camagüeyanos al entregarles su Bandera to her uncle Joaquín de Agüero, a Cuban independence activist and abolitionist activist. On 4 July 1851, she joined him in a pro-independence revolt, dressed as a male soldier. On several occasions and especially when she wrote poems about independence, she wrote using a masculine voice.

With the failure of the revolt, her uncle was sentenced to death and she was banished. She left for Havana in 1859, where she began her career as an actress, starring as the protagonist in Tomás Rodríguez Rubí's drama La trenza de sus cabellos and soon after in the play Borrascas del corazón. In April 1861, she married José Desiderio de Poo y Álvarez. During this time, she continued her activities in favor of Cuban independence and wrote in several periodicals, such as La Tertulia, La Niñez and Mensajero de las Damas.

In 1898, her husband died from injuries caused by a bomb explosion in a theater. In 1899, the Patriotic Ladies' Association (Spanish: Asociación de Damas Patrióticas) was founded, of which Martina was vice-president. She died on 31 May 1900 at the age of 67.

== Selected works ==
- Una noche de Luna (1847)
- El numen (1848)
- Ser algún dia hijos de un pueblo libre
- A los camagüeyanos al entregarles su Bandera (1851)
- A la muerte de Joaquín de Agüero
- Desaliento (1852)
- A Manuel de Nápoles y Fajardo (1855)
- El amor (1860)
- El viajero
- Improvisación al pasar el entierro de don José de la Luz y Caballero (1862)
- Al ateneo
- La Habana y el Camagüey (1868)
- Lucrecia (1878)
- El león y el esclavo (1878)
- A Italia (1883)
- Al Bélico (1883)
- A María de la Concepción Chacón y Calderón (1883)

== Bibliography ==
- Galletti Hernandez, Danay (3 September 2021). "Mujeres vestidas de hombres para eludir tabúes de su época". Prensa Latina – via Noticias Cubanas.
- García de Coronado, Domitila (1868). Album poético-fotográfico de las escritoras cubanas (in Spanish). Viuda e Hs. de Soler. pp. 52–68. OCLC 681708381.
- García de Coronado, Domitila (1926). "Martina Pierra de Poo". Album poético fotográfico de escritoras y poetisas cubanas (in Spanish) (3rd ed.). Havana: Imprenta de "El Figaro". pp. 76–86. OCLC 567871 – via University of Miami.
- Moris Campos, Judith (2007). Aznar Soler, Manuel (ed.). Hacia una desarticulación del tópico de la 'virgen triste' en el Epistolario de Juana Borrero (Thesis). Autonomous University of Barcelona.
