= José Tomás Betancourt =

Cuban statesmen (1811–1851)

Personal details
- Born: José Tomás Betancourt y Zayas; 1811 Puerto Príncipe, Captaincy General of Cuba, Spanish Empire
- Died: August 12, 1851 (aged 39–40) Arroyo Méndez, Puerto Príncipe, Captaincy General of Cuba, Spanish Empire
- Cause of death: Execution by firing squad
- Resting place: General Cemetery of Camagüey

José Tomás Betancourt (1811 – August 12, 1851) was a Cuban revolutionary executed alongside Joaquín de Agüero by the Spanish authorities for his role in the early fight for Cuba's independence.

== Early life ==
José Tomás Betancourt y Zayas was born in Puerto Príncipe (now Camagüey), Spanish Cuba around 1811.

With a lineage extending back to the surname Bettencourt, his family was one of the most distinguished in the region.

In the summer of 1851, he was involved in the insurrection led by Joaquín de Agüero. On July 23, 1851, José Tomás Betancourt, Fernando Zayas, Miguel Benavides, Miguel Castellanos, Adolfo Pierra y Aguero were ambushed by Spanish authorities under José Lémery at Punta de Ganado in Nuevitas. Amid the gunfire, José Tomás Betancourt and his group fled toward the sea, where Betancourt was captured with minor injuries. They were held at the cavalry barracks and underwent a court-martial that was convened. Lémery declared on August 11, 1851, that the men convicted of sedition would be executed by firing squad in Arroyo Méndez the next morning, as ordered by the military commission of Puerto Príncipe. Betancourt, Agüero, Fernando de Zayas, and Miguel Benavides were to be executed, while the others received prison sentences.

== Death ==
José Tomás Betancourt was executed by firing squad near Arroyo Méndez in Camagüey on August 12, 1851. He was buried with his compatriots in the General Cemetery of Camagüey.

== Honors ==
- Betancourt was commemorated on a plaque in Ignacio Agramonte Park (Spanish: Parque Ignacio Agramonte) in Camagüey, where four palm trees were planted to signify the martyrdom of the four who were executed.
