= Louisa Jaques =

South African-Swiss mystic

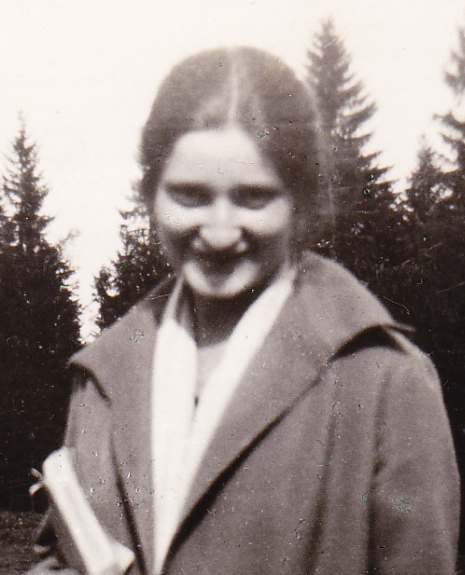
- Louisa Jaques
- Born: 26 April 1901; Pretoria
- Died: 25 June 1942 (aged 41); Jerusalem
- Citizenship: South Africa

Louisa Jaques (April 26, 1901, Pretoria – June 25, 1942, Jerusalem) was a South African-Swiss mystic. In the Order of Poor Clares she had the monastic name Mary of the Trinity and, for a short period.

== Childhood ==
Louisa was born to a missionary couple – Numa Jaques (1864–1949) and Elisa née Bornand (1865–1901) – who worked for the Mission Suisse romande in Transvaal in the midst of the Second Boer War. Her mother Elisa died shortly after giving birth to Louisa. The one-year-old half-orphan returned to French-speaking Switzerland with her three older siblings, her father, and an aunt. Raised in a Free Church Calvinist milieu by two of her mother's sisters, Louisa completed her schooling in the summer of 1917 without a state certificate, as her education had been limited to private schools. She matured to be a subtle and highly sensitive person with lasting health problems caused by a weak lung.

== Employment and illnesses ==
At the end of 1917, the sixteen-year-old Louisa took up her first job as a secretary with a socially and politically committed couple named Horber, who helped organize the founding of a "Swiss Federation for Transitional Reforms" in the Swiss post-war period. Weakened by anemia and with the beginnings of tuberculosis, the following year Louisa Jaques went for treatment at the sanatorium "L'Espérance" in Leysin, run by a Dr. Olivier. There she made the acquaintance of Bluette de Blaireville, who became her lifelong friend. She also met, among others, Adrienne von Speyr, a cousin of Dr. Olivier and a classmate of Bluette in La Chaux-de-Fonds.

After her dismissal in May 1919, Louisa took a short-term job as an accountant with a notary in Lausanne. In 1920–21, she took care of her elderly and ailing aunt Alice Bornand (1859–1928) in L'Auberson at the family home. In March 1924 she again found work as a typist with the theologian and later pastor Lydia von Auw, a friend of her family. An acute hemorrhage shortly after she started work resulted in her being referred to the "Béthanie" house in Lausanne, run by deaconesses, for tuberculin treatment.

== Friendships ==
Although her family was scattered all over the world – in the Transvaal, in Missouri, in Switzerland and Italy respectively, and later in Jerusalem – Louisa always remained connected with her parents, her siblings Alexandre (1895–1949), Elisabeth (1896–1977 [?]) and Alice (1898–1988 [?]), as well as with her half-brothers from her father's third marriage, Auguste (1912–?) and Eddy (1916–?).

In 1922 she made the acquaintance of Suzanne Verena Pfenninger (1896–1977), who later converted to the Roman Catholic Church and gave Louisa a decisive impulse toward appreciating the reality of the Catholic sacraments during a summer vacation in Switzerland in 1927.

An unrealizable longing for the married physician and father Dr. Charles Rittmeyer (1891–1925) exacerbated her own family, economic, and health situation when he died unexpectedly. Louisa fell into a life crisis marked by severe depression; it lasted from 1925 to 1926.

During a stay with her friend Bluette, on the night of February 13–14, exactly one year after the doctor's death, she had a mystical experience – a kind of vision of a religious woman – which gave her the inner certainty that she must enter a contemplative order.

== Conversion to Catholicism ==
Having moved to Milan in October 1926 because of a job, Louisa decided, through the mediation of a priest, to take catechism classes with the Sisters "Nostra Signora del Cenacolo" in that city. Mother Reggio prepared her for baptism conversion to the Roman Catholic Church. Although she was invited several times by her father to South Africa and by her sister Alice to America, she decided to stay in Italy. A change in her job as a tutor and educator introduced her to the world of the Milanese aristocracy, particularly the family of Countess Agliardi. In this context, she completed a kind of Montessori training with Countess Borromeo, who was a sister of her new employer.

She made a retreat and then resolved to enter a monastery.

== Entering monasteries ==
Three convent entries that took place in 1929/30 were short-lived. These were the Little Sisters of the Assumption of Mary into Heaven, the Franciscan Sisters of the Mission in Egypt, and the Franciscan Sisters of the Child Jesus.

Through the mediation of Bluette de Blaireville, Louisa finally arrived in La Chaux-de-Fonds, where she met the community of the Daughters of the Sacred Heart of Mary, which she entered in 1931. As Sr. Monique Marie du Bon Pasteur, she was admitted to the novitiate and was able to obtain a state diploma at the Teacher Training College. She then taught at the Catholic parochial school in Neuchâtel. In this religious community, which offered her the framework of solid intellectual and spiritual formation, she remained for a total of five years, twice renewing her temporary vows but leaving before final vows.

Due to her unquenched longing for a contemplative monastic life, she left the community in 1936, after having met in Neuchâtel the priest Maurice Zundel. He was known for his controversial books of mystical theology; he encouraged her to join the Poor Clares. From this point on, Zundel was her spiritual advisor. On September 1, 1936, she joined the Poor Clares in Evian as a postulant, but remained only until April 10, 1937, when the mentally ill abbess dismissed her. After this upsetting convent experience, Louisa worked temporarily as a nanny in Lausanne with a working-class family which had six children, and then again with Countess Agliardi in Cortina d'Ampezzo. Her prospects for a convent life seemed to have disappeared.

== Last years ==
Louisa Jaques decided to visit her family in South Africa, together with her sister Alice and her children, and arrived in Johannesburg on August 28, 1937, where she was reunited with her parents and siblings. Still uncertain about her future, she took up employment as a home teacher in various Jewish families over the next few months.

In 1938, motivated by reading the writings of Charles de Foucauld, she decided to make a pilgrimage to the Holy Land, reaching Jerusalem. There she entered the convent of the Poor Clares on June 30. On August 28, 1939, she was initiated as Sr. Mary of the Trinity. Two years later she made an extraordinary vow of total devotion. In June 1942, typhus fever broke out in the convent. Sr. Maria died of it on June 25, 1942.

== Writings ==
Through her confessor, Fr. Sylvère Van den Broeck, she was urged in the last two years of her life to put down in writing her vocational journey and also to record the words of the "inner voice" she heard. After her death, he published her writings. This edition of 1943, translated into various languages in the years that followed, brought about an unprecedented awareness and engagement with the spiritual content of these writings, especially in Italy through the work of the Franciscans of the Custody of the Holy Land.

The works of Sister Mary of the Trinity have been published in French, Italian, Dutch, Spanish, Slovenian, Croatian, German, Arabic, Hungarian, Portuguese and English editions.
