= Helene von Druskowitz =

Austrian philosopher, writer and music critic

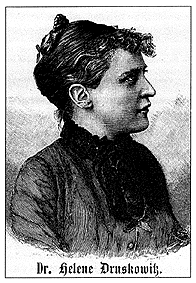
Helene Druskowitz

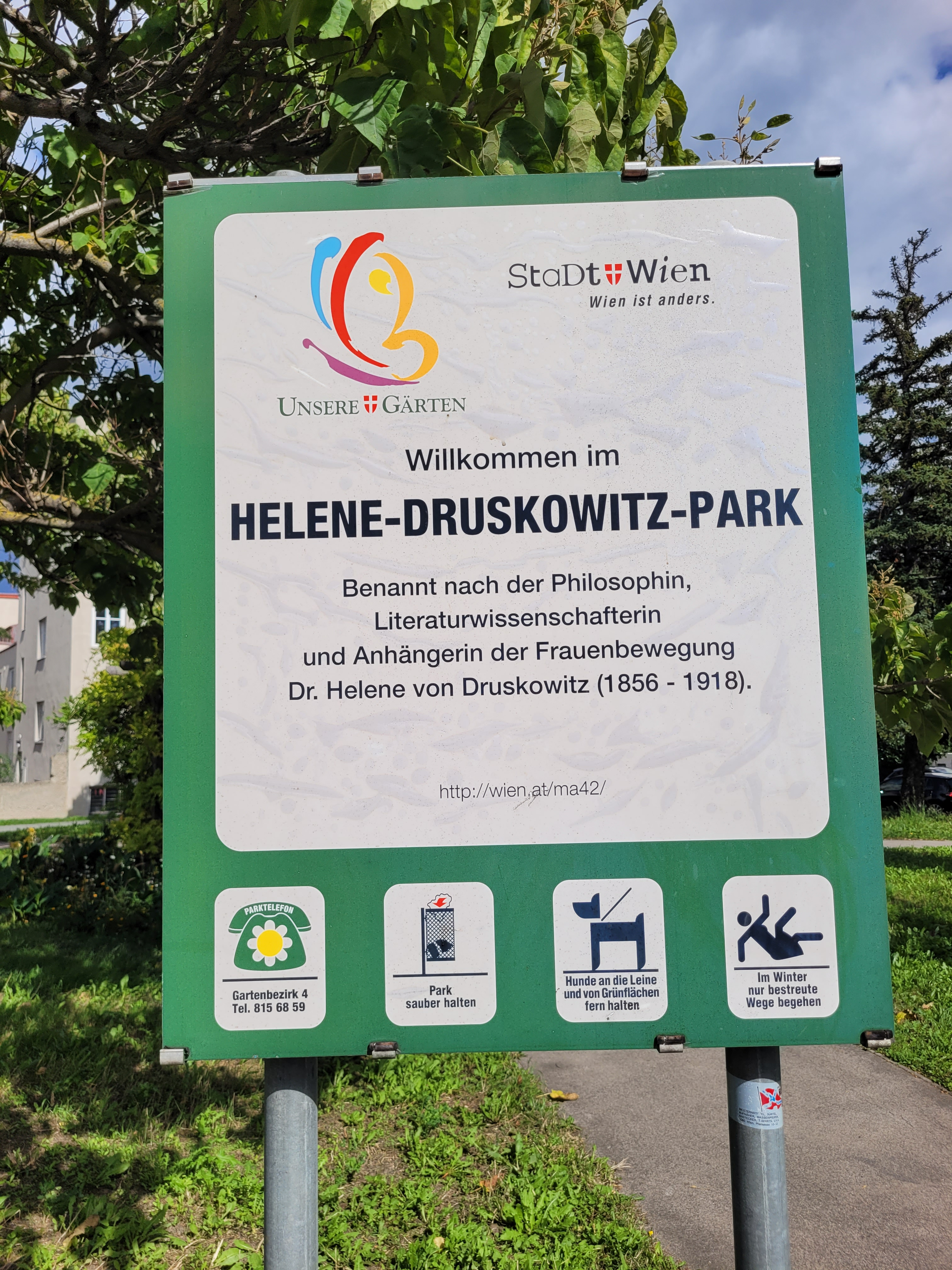
Helene von Druskowitz has a park dedicated to her in Vienna, Austria.

Helene von Druskowitz (2 May 1856 – 31 May 1918), born Helena Maria Druschkovich, was an Austrian philosopher, writer and music critic. She was the second woman to achieve a Doctorate in Philosophy, which she obtained at Zürich. She usually published under a male alias because of predominant sexism.

== Biography ==
Druskowitz was born at Hietzing, in Vienna. In 1874 she moved to Zürich and completed her Matura in 1878. After studying philosophy, archeology, German literature, Orientalism and modern languages, she became the first Austrian woman and the second after Stefania Wolicka to obtain a doctorate in philosophy, with a dissertation on Byron's Don Juan. She then worked as a literary history teacher in different universities (Vienna, Zurich, Munich, Basel). She also traveled to North Africa, France, Italy and Spain before returning to Vienna. In 1881 she met Marie von Ebner-Eschenbach who introduced her to her literary circle. Three years later, she became acquainted with Lou Andreas Salomé and Friedrich Nietzsche, whom she was introduced to by the circle of Malwida von Meysenbug. Helene Druskowitz was one of the happy few who received a copy of the fourth book of Thus Spoke Zarathustra, published at the author's expense. However, the relationship with Nietzsche did not last long.

In 1885 she published a book on Three English Writers, Joanna Baillie, Elizabeth Barrett Browning and George Eliot.

Helene Druskowitz's brother died in 1886, and her mother in 1888. In 1887, she began a live-in relationship in Dresden with the opera singer Therese Malten. She started to drink excessively and also had some drug problems. After a romantic separation in 1891, she finally slipped into alcoholism, and was sent in 1891 to a psychiatric hospital in Dresden. However, when her funds had dried up, she was sent back to Vienna and placed under guardianship on 7 Juli 1891 stripping her of her rights for the rest of her life.

Helene continued to write and publish until 1905. She helped found the feminist reviews Der heilige Kampf (The Holy Struggle) and Der Federuf (The Call to Feud). Druskowitz criticized both religion, sexism and, after her break with Nietzsche, his philosophy.

She died at the end of May 1918 in Mauer-Öhling, of dysentery, having spent the last 27 years of her life in a psychiatric institution.

== Works ==
- Sultan und Prinz (1882)
- Der Präsident vom Zitherclub (1883–84)
- Percy Bysshe Shelley (1884)
- Drei englische Dichterinnen (Three English Writers, 1885)
- Moderne Versuche eines Religionsersatzes (1886)
- Wie ist Verantwortung und Zurechnung ohne Annahme der Willensfreiheit möglich? (1887)
- Zur neuen Lehre. Betrachtungen (1888)
- Zur Begründung einer neuen Weltanschauung (Zur neuen Lehre) (1889)
- Eugen Dühring. Eine Studie zu seiner Würdigung (1889)
- Aspasia (1889)
- Die Pädagogin (1890)
- Philosophischer Rundfragebogen (1903)
- Pessimistische Kardinalsätze (1988, with the title Der Mann als logische und sittliche Unmöglichkeit und als Fluch der Welt)

== See also ==
- Feminism
- Nietzsche
