= Malwida von Meysenbug =

German writer (1816–1903)

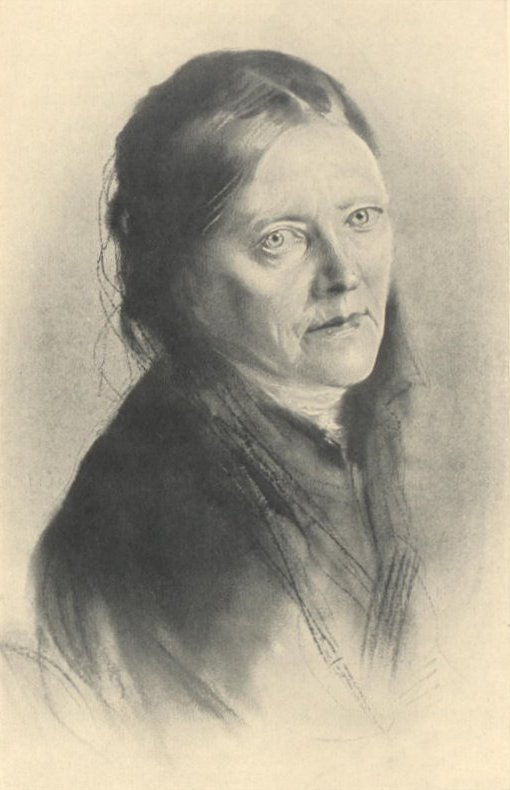
- portrait by Franz von Lenbach
- Born: 28 October 1816; Kassel, Hesse, Germany
- Died: 23 April 1903 (aged 86); Rome, Italy
- Occupation: Author
- Known for: Memoirs of an Idealist
- Parent: Carl Rivalier von Meysenbug (father)

Malwida von Meysenbug (28 October 1816 — 23 April 1903) was a German writer, her work including Memoirs of an Idealist, the first volume of which she published anonymously in 1869. As well, she was a friend of Friedrich Nietzsche and Richard Wagner, and met the French writer Romain Rolland in Rome in 1890.

== Biography ==
Von Meysenbug was born at Kassel, Hesse. Her father Carl Rivalier von Meysenbug descended from a family of French Huguenots, and received the title of Baron of Meysenbug from William I of Hesse-Kassel. The ninth of ten children, she broke with her family because of her political convictions. Two of her brothers made brilliant careers, one as a minister of state in Austria, and the other as Minister of the Karlsruhe. von Meysenbug, however, refused to appeal to her family and lived first by joining a free community in Hamburg, and then by immigrating in 1852 to England where she lived by teaching and translating works. There, she met the republicans Ledru-Rollin, Louis Blanc, and Gottfried Kinkel, all political refugees; the young Carl Schurz also became acquainted with her there.

In 1862 von Meysenbug went to Italy with Olga Herzen, the daughter of Alexander Herzen, known as the "father of Russian socialism" (and whose daughters she taught) and resided there. Olga Herzen married Gabriel Monod in 1873 and established herself in France, but Malwida's poor health obstructed her from joining her.

Von Meysenbug introduced Nietzsche to several of his friends, including Helene von Druskowitz. She invited Paul Rée and Nietzsche to Sorrento, a town which overlooks the bay of Naples, in the autumn of 1876. There, Rée wrote The Origins of Moral Sensations, and Nietzsche began Human, All Too Human.

In 1890, the late nineteenth century English novelist George Gissing wrote in his diary that he was 're-reading Memoiren einer Idealisten'.

Malwida von Meysenbug died in Rome in 1903 and is buried in the Protestant Cemetery in the city.

=== Nobel Prize in Literature ===
In 1901, von Meysenbug was the first woman ever to be nominated for the Nobel Prize in Literature after having been nominated by the French historian Gabriel Monod. The Nobel Committee considered her writings to be inferior in nature and "certainly reveal great erudition and good presentation skills, but are partly of little importance in terms of content, and partly are marked by immature, radically socialist tendencies."

== Literary Works ==
=== Published during lifetime ===
- Memoiren einer Idealistin ("Memoirs of an Idealist", 1869–1876)
- Stimmungsbilder aus dem Vermächtniss einer alten Frau ("Atmospheric Images from the Legacy of an Old Woman", 1879)
- Der Lebensabend einer Idealistin ("The Twilight of an Idealist's Life", 1898)
- Individualitäten ("Individualities", 1901)

=== Posthomously publications ===
- Stimmungsbilder ("Mood Pictures", 1905)
- Himmlische und irdische Liebe ("Heavenly and Earthly Love", 1905)
- Im Anfang war die Liebe ("In the Beginning There Was Love", 1926)
- Florence. Roman aus dem viktorianischen England ("Florence: A Novel from Victorian England", 2007; edited by Ruth Stummann-Bowert)
- Une amitié européenne. Romain Rolland et Malwida von Meysenbug. Correspondance 1890-1903 ("A European Ally: Romain Rolland and Malwida von Meysenbug – Correspondence 1890-1903", 2016)

=== Anthologies ===
- Ausgewählte Schriften ("Selected Writings", 2000; edited by Sabine Hering and Karl-Heinz Nickel)

== See also ==
- Forty-Eighters: She was sympathetic with the 1848 revolutions although not an active participant.
