= William Logan Crittenden =

United States Army officer and adventurer (1823–1851)

- Born: May 30, 1823; Kentucky, United States
- Died: August 16, 1851 (aged 27); Havana, Cuba
- Alma mater: West Point
- Relatives: Thomas Theodore Crittenden (brother)
- Military career
- Allegiance: United States; Lopez filibusters
- Branch: United States Army
- Conflicts: Mexican–American War; Lopez Expedition

Colonel William Logan Crittenden (May 30, 1823 – August 16, 1851) was a United States Army officer who fought in the Mexican–American War and later accompanied Narciso López's 1851 filibustering Lopez Expedition in Cuba. He was captured by Spanish forces and executed in Havana on August 16, 1851.

== Early life ==
Crittenden was born to Henry and Anna Marie (Allen) Crittenden in 1823. His brother was Thomas Theodore Crittenden, who became Governor of Missouri in 1881 and issued a bounty for Jesse James. At the time of Crittenden's participation in the López expedition, his uncle, John J. Crittenden, was serving as Attorney General of the United States.

Crittenden's paternal grandfather was John Crittenden, who served as a major with the Virginia militia in the American Revolution and was one of the first settlers in Kentucky. His maternal grandfather was John Allen, a Kentucky soldier who was killed in action at the Battle of Frenchtown in 1813. Through Allen, he was also a descendant of Benjamin Logan, an early Kentucky pioneer.

== Military career ==
Crittenden enrolled in the Military Academy at West Point in 1839. In October 1844, Crittenden viciously attacked cadet George H. Derby with a sword based on a perceived insult causing Derby to spend three weeks in the hospital. Although the superintendent requested his immediate expulsion, because of Crittenden's well-connected political family, he never faced a court martial. Because of his constant poor behavior, Crittenden took six years to graduate and in 1845, was the class "goat," the derisive name used for the cadet who was last academically.

After graduation, served in Company K, 5th U.S. Infantry, in the Mexican War. After the war, he resigned his commission and, in 1851, joined López's expedition to filibuster Cuba to expand slavery. The expedition departed New Orleans on August 3, 1851, on the steamer Pampero. The filibusters disembarked at the village of Morillos on August 12. Upon their arrival, however, they found little support among the local Cuban population and López traveled inland, leaving Crittenden in command of a force of 100 men. Spanish forces quickly surrounded Crittenden's troops, who desperately tried to escape the island in four small fishing boats. They were quickly captured by the Spanish steamer Habanero on the 15th. Crittenden and 50 of his men were taken to Havana and executed on August 16.

Americans in both the north and the south were infuriated when news of the executions reached the States. Even if they disapproved of the filibusters' breach of neutrality, many Americans saw the response of the Spanish officers as unnecessarily brutal. In New Orleans, growing anti-Spanish sentiment resulted in riots that attacked the Spanish consulate in the city. However, the U.S. government refused to officially protest Spain's actions, maintaining that the expedition had been an illegal operation.

Crittenden became a martyr and folk hero to the people in Kentucky in the years following his death. A popular story purported that he had refused to be blindfolded or kneel to his executioners, proclaiming that "A Kentuckian always faces his enemy and kneels only to his God."

== See also ==
- Ostend Manifesto
- Cuba-United States Relations
