= Anna Laurens Dawes =

American author and suffragist

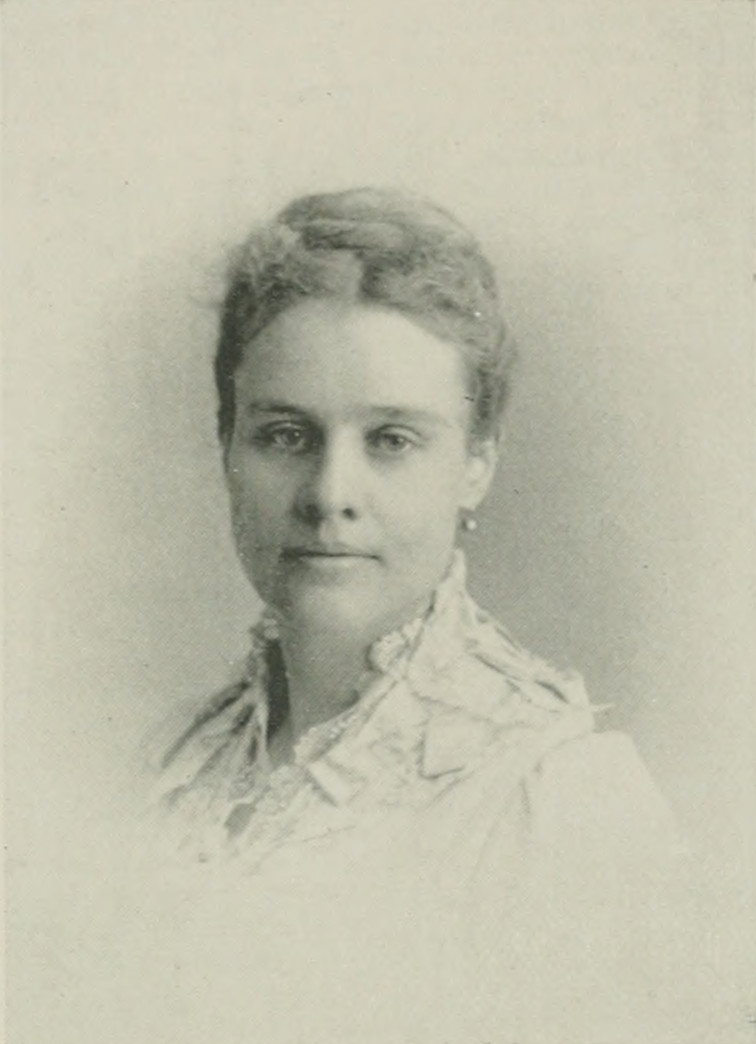
- Born: May 14, 1851; North Adams Massachusetts
- Died: September 25, 1938
- Education: High school
- Alma mater: Maplewood Institute, Abbot Academy
- Writing career
- Language: English
- Notable works: How We are Governed (1885); The Modern Jew: His Present and his Future (1886); A United States Prison; An Unknown Nation (1888); Charles Sumner (1892); The Indian as Citizen (1917)

Anna Laurens Dawes (May 14, 1851 – September 25, 1938) was an American author and anti-suffragist. She was the daughter of Henry Laurens Dawes (October 30, 1816 – February 5, 1903), a Republican United States Senator and Representative of Massachusetts.

Dawes created the Wednesday Morning Club in 1879 and was its president for sixty years. She later became a trustee of Smith College (1889–1896). In 1883, she secured governmental aid for the Leif exposition to search for Major General A. W. Greely, who had been missing in the Arctic for three years. Dawes served on the board of the Chicago Columbian Exposition of 1892–1894, as well as the St. Louis Exposition of 1902–1904.

Notable works include How We are Governed (1885), The Modern Jew: His Present and his Future (1886), A United States Prison (1886), An Unknown Nation (1888), Charles Sumner (1892), and The Indian as Citizen (1917).

== Biography ==
Anna Laurens Dawes was born in North Adams, Massachusetts, and her family later moved to the town of Pittsfield, Massachusetts. Though she attended both the Maplewood Institute and Abbot Academy, Dawes did not graduate from either institution. She also did not have any formal college education. She spent much of her life in Washington, D.C., with her father, coming back to Massachusetts shortly after his death in 1903. She was married to James J Dawes, but they divorced.

Though she got her start writing for newspapers, her main area of interests was the support of women's education. Because of these interests she was considered a beloved and generous alumna of Abbot Academy, serving as president of the Alumnae Association for two terms (1910-1914). A building at Smith College is named after her (Dawes House).

=== Professional life and activism ===
Despite her lack of a formal education, Anna Dawes began a successful career as a writer at the age of twenty, joining her father in Washington D.C. There, she became a correspondent for the Springfield Republican, the Boston Congregationalist, and the Christian Union.

Dawes spent much of her life assisting her father in Washington, serving as his private secretary. This allowed her to meet many of the presidents and other political figures up until her father's death in 1903. Political in her own right, Anna Dawes belonged to many women's groups and was very active in political groups that piqued her interest, especially those that pertained to women's education (later becoming a trustee of Smith College from 1889-1896). This included groups like the Wednesday Morning Club, which Dawes established in 1879 and served as president for sixty years. In 1883, she secured governmental aid for the Leif exposition to search for Major General A. W. Greely, who had been missing in the Arctic for three years. She was also the vice-president of the Massachusetts State Anti-Suffrage Society. Dawes served on the board of the Chicago Columbian Exposition of 1892-1894, as well as the St. Louis Exposition of 1902-1904.

== Bibliography ==
- How We are Governed (1885)
- The Modern Jew: His Present and his Future (1886)
- A United States Prison (1886)
- An Unknown Nation (1888)
- Charles Sumner (1892)
- The Indian as Citizen (1917)
