= Narciso López =

Venezuelan-born adventurer and Spanish Army general (1797–1851)

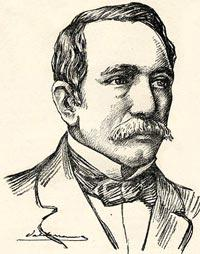
- Born: Narciso López de Urriola; November 2, 1797; Caracas, Venezuela
- Died: September 1, 1851 (aged 53); Havana, Cuba
- Cause of death: Execution by garrote
- Military career
- Allegiance: Spain; Filibusters
- Branch: Spanish Army
- Rank: General
- Known for: Expeditions aimed at liberating Cuba from Spanish rule
- Conflicts: Venezuelan War of Independence; Battle of Las Queseras del Medio; Battle of Carabobo; Battle of Lake Maracaibo; First Carlist War; Lopez Expedition

Narciso López de Urriola (November 2, 1797 – September 1, 1851) was a Venezuelan-born adventurer and Spanish Army general who is best known for his expeditions aimed at liberating Cuba from Spanish rule in the 1850s. His troops carried a flag that López had designed, which later became the flag of Cuba. Following his final failed attempt he was captured and garroted for treason in Havana.

== Life in Venezuela, Cuba, and Spain ==
Flag of Cuba (1906-present)

Flag of Cuba (1902–1906); Cuban flag designed by Narciso López

Narciso López was born in Caracas, Venezuela, to a wealthy merchant family of Basque origin; his father was Pedro Manuel López and his mother was Ana Paula de Oriola (sometimes spelled Urriola). He had one sister, Maria Asunción López. As a young teenager, he was forcibly recruited in 1814 by the ruthless Spanish General José Tomás Boves from the ranks of the defeated independence forces that had been abandoned by a fleeing Simón Bolívar at the city of Valencia.

When still a young man, he fought for the Spanish at the Battle of Queseras del Medio (1819) and Carabobo (1821) against the forces for independence led by Simón Bolívar, José Antonio Páez and others.

When the Spanish army withdrew in defeat to Cuba after the decisive Battle of Lake Maracaibo (1823), López, who had fought in this battle, left with them, as did many other survivors including Calixto García de Luna e Izquierdo, who would be grandfather of Cuban independence Major General Calixto García. In 1825, he married the sister of the Count of Pozos Dulces in Cuba, María Dolores, with whom he had a son. Narciso López, who had earned the rank of colonel of the Spanish Army in Venezuela at only 31, fought in the First Carlist War. After the war, López continued to serve the Spanish government in several administrative posts, including the Cortes for Seville and as military governor in Madrid. López moved to Cuba as an assistant to the new capitan general, but he lost his post when the governorship changed hands in 1843. After failing in a few business ventures, he became a partisan of the anti-Spanish faction in Cuba. In 1848, during a Spanish arrest of Cuban revolutionaries, López fled to the United States.

== Filibuster ==
Once arrived López began planning a filibustering expedition from the United States to liberate Cuba. He made contact with influential American politicians, including John L. O'Sullivan, an expansionist who coined the term "manifest destiny." López recruited Cuban exiles in New York City and other adventurers to his cause, and in 1849, his expedition was poised to embark: a troop of 600 volunteers had gathered on Round Island, Mississippi, with three ships chartered (two in New York and one in New Orleans) to transport them. However, US President Zachary Taylor, who had renounced filibustering as a valid means of US expansion, took steps against López and ordered his ships to be blockaded and seized. By September 9, the "roughnecks" had all been talked into leaving Round Island.

López, his aide-de-camp Ambrosio José Gonzales, and most of the filibuster leadership were Freemasons who relied extensively on the international fraternity to accomplish their plans.

Undeterred by that setback, López decided to plan a new filibuster and to focus his recruiting effort on the Southern United States. As a supporter of slavery himself, López realized the advantages for the South of an independent Cuba. He and some Southerners hoped that Cuba would become a strong partner in slavery and perhaps, like Texas, join the Union as a slave state. He moved his headquarters to New Orleans and tried to gain popular support by recruiting influential men of the South to join his expedition. He solicited the military help of Senator Jefferson Davis, who had distinguished himself in the Battle of Buena Vista, by offering him $100,000 and "a very fine coffee plantation." Davis, to the great relief of his wife, turned him down but recommended one of his friends from the Mexican–American War, Major Robert E. Lee. Lee thought seriously about López's offer but eventually also decided not to become involved.

Although López failed to recruit either rising star, he won the financial and political support of many influential Southerners, including Governor John A. Quitman of Mississippi; former Senator John Henderson; and the editor of the New Orleans Delta, Laurence Sigur. López enlisted about 600 filibusters in his expedition and successfully reached Cuba in May 1850. His troops seized the town of Cárdenas, carrying a flag that López and Miguel Teurbe Tolón had designed, which later became the flag of Cuba. Nevertheless, the local support that he had hoped for failed to materialize when the fighting started. Much of the local population joined the Spanish against López, and he hastily retreated to Key West, where he disbanded the expedition within minutes of landing to avoid being prosecuted under the Neutrality Act of 1794.

In the aftermath of the expedition, López and many of his supporters were indicted by a federal grand jury. Although the indictments did not end in convictions, they forced Governor John Quitman to resign from his office and to face trial. Despite military and legal setbacks, López began planning another expedition, which met with the similar problems and even more disastrous consequences.

In August 1851, López once again departed for Cuba with several hundred men (mostly Americans, Hungarians, Germans and some Cubans). When he arrived, he took half of his expedition to march inland, and the other half, commanded by Colonel William Crittenden (a former US Army lieutenant), remained on the northern coast to protect supplies. As had occurred during his first attempt, the local support that López had counted upon did not answer his appeals. Outnumbered and surrounded by Spanish forces, López and many men were captured. Crittenden's forces shared the same fate. The Spanish executed most of the prisoners and sent others to work in mining labor camps.

Those executed included many Americans, such as Crittenden, and López in Castle La Punta of Havana.

== Aftermath and significance ==
The execution of López and his soldiers caused outrage in both the Northern and the Southern United States. Many who did not support the expedition found the Spanish treatment of military prisoners to be brutal. The strongest reaction occurred in New Orleans, where a mob attacked the Spanish consulate. Despite its failure, López's expedition inspired other filibusters to attack all over Latin America throughout the 1850s, most notably William Walker's invasions of Nicaragua in 1855 to 1860. Had he been successful, López could have profoundly altered politics in the Americas by giving a strong Caribbean foothold to the United States and spurring its further expansion. Instead, the failure of López and other filibusters discouraged Americans, especially in the South, from adopting expansionist strategies. Faced with the inability of slavery to move southward, many Southerners turned away from expansion and talked instead of secession, which led to the American Civil War.

The flag of Cuba is adopted from López's expeditionary banner.

== See also ==
- History of Cuba
- History of the United States (1849–1865)
- Bay of Pigs Invasion
- Cuba–United States relations
- Cuba–Venezuela relations
