= Allan J. Kuethe =

American historian

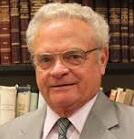
- Kuethe in 2020
- Born: Allan James Kuethe; 1940 (age 85–86)
- Education: University of Iowa; University of Florida
- Occupation: Historian

Allan James Kuethe (born 1940) is an American historian. He was the Paul Whitfield Horn Distinguished Professor in the department of history at Texas Tech University.
