= Madre Teresa Nuzzo =

Servant of God Maria Teresa Nuzzo U.Q.Ġ.
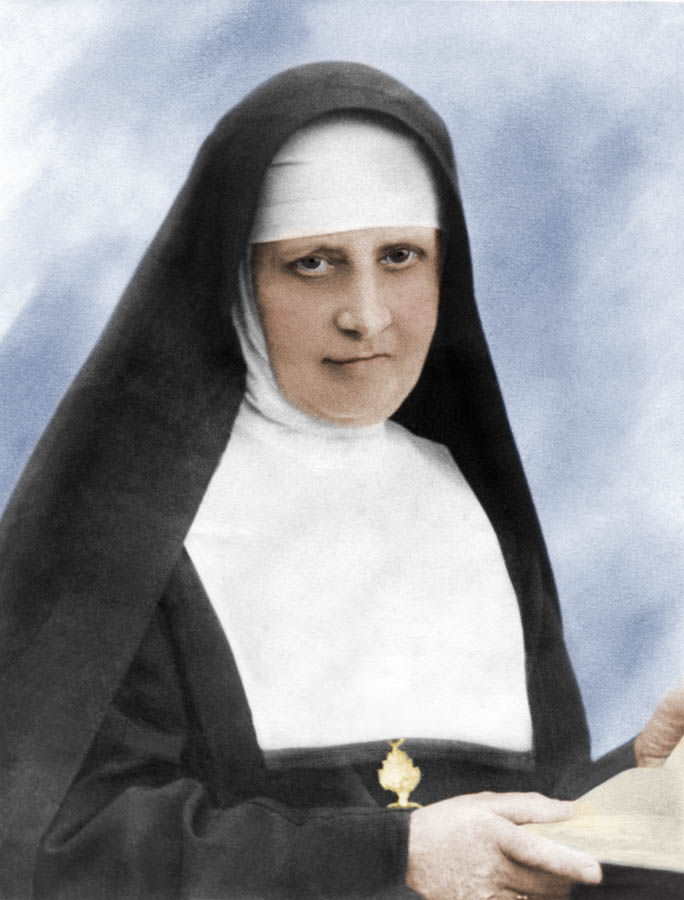
- A portrait of Madre Teresa Nuzzo

Foundress
- Born: 11 May 1851; Valletta, Malta
- Died: 17 April 1923; Hamrun, Malta
- Venerated in: Roman Catholic Church
- Major works: Daughters of the Sacred Heart
- Website: motherteresanuzzo.org

Maria Teresa Nuzzo (11 May 1851 in Valletta, Malta – 17 April 1923) was a Roman Catholic nun, founder of the religious institute Daughters of the Sacred Heart.

== Early life ==
Maria Teresa was born into a strongly Christian family, the second child born to Paul and Louisa Morrocchi Nuzzo. Her elder brother died in a cholera outbreak, leaving Maria Teresa the eldest. A day after Maria Teresa was born, she was baptised in the Collegiate Parish of St. Paul, and she received confirmation at the age of eight.

In Maria Teresa's early years, education was not compulsory in Malta. Few could afford to send their children to school: most children worked to earn money to help their families. However, Maria Teresa was fortunate enough to receive an education. Talented in handiwork and music, she developed an early interest in children and their welfare. In 1867, aged sixteen, Maria Teresa became responsible for a school run by her aunt, who had become blind and who died on 4 March 1867.

Although Maria Teresa began to feel a desire to embrace religious life, she felt responsibility for her parents – her father was seventy and ailing – and for the school under her care. At the age of 21 she considered the possibility of taking private vows of poverty, chastity and obedience as a lay person.

== Private vows ==
Maria Teresa consulted her spiritual director, Mgr. Pietro Pace who encouraged her to take her vows on the feast of St. Teresa of Avila. Maria Theresa still felt torn: though inclined to religious life, she was unsure whether she would ultimately leave her family. On 21 October 1874, she made her vows privately in the hands of Mgr. Pietro Pace. Two years later, when she was still only twenty-five, her father died.

Maria Teresa continued to feel attracted to enter a convent, and moreover to join the cloistered nuns. In 1880, she brought this to the attention of her Spiritual Director, who told her outright: "You are not suited for the cloister". So her life continued to revolve around the school, and catechetical and pastoral care after school hours. A year later in 1881 her mother died.

== The Daughters of the Sacred Heart ==
Maria Theresa began to hope to set up a religious congregation who would follow Christ closely and be dedicated to the charitable service of education and social work. Despite lack of finance, Maria Theresa trusted in God's providence, and after a long struggle, managed to see the realisation of her dreams in 1902.

A cousin, Enrico Nuzzo, shared the same ideal: to help educate the unfortunate in society, especially girls. In his mid-life, the latter desired to use his money for a social project to realise his ideals. When the two met, Enrico told Maria Teresa of his dream. She expressed the desire of accepting the offer and her desire to form a Religious Institute. This was passed on to the Archbishop to whom Enrico had entrusted the land with a house for the project. The Archbishop knew Maria Teresa well, and was happy to see her hopes and dreams actualised.

In 1902, the building started and in 1903, Maria Teresa - now aged 52 - started living in that house with the first members of her new foundation. Thus at the age of 52 years, Maria Teresa managed to set up the congregation she had dreamt of. The Congregation of the Daughters of the Sacred Heart was officially founded on 21 November 1903.

Today, the Daughters of the Sacred Heart are in Malta, India, Libya, Kenya, Tanzania, Philippines and United States of America.

== See also ==
- Hamrun
