= Daughters of the Sacred Heart =

Roman Catholic religious institute for women (founded 1903)

Daughters of the Sacred Heart is a Roman Catholic religious institute for women founded by Madre Teresa Nuzzo in 1903.

== History ==
In 1988 the institute was approved as a Congregation of Pontifical Right.

== Apostolate ==
The congregation has convents in Malta, India, Kenya, Tanzania, Uganda, Philippines Rome and in the U.S.A. The Sisters carry out a variety of apostolates especially in schools, teaching catechism in the parishes, rendering services to the local churches, and running Day Care Centres and orphanages.

They operate a Kindergarten in Ħamrun and a Primary School at Marsa. They also have a Children's Home at Żurrieq and a Day Centre for children in Żejtun and Mellieħa.
