= Rosa Kerschbaumer-Putjata =

Russian ophthalmologist and Austrian doctor

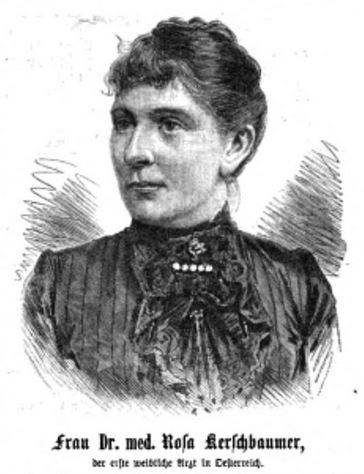
- Born: Rosa Wassiljewna Schlykowa; 21 April 1851; Moscow, Russian Empire
- Died: 27 July 1923 (aged 72); Los Angeles, California
- Children: 3
- Scientific career
- Fields: ophthalmology

Rosa Kerschbaumer-Putjata (née Wassiljewna Schlykowa, Russian: аиса Васильевна Шлыкова, 21 April 1851 – 27 July 1923) was a Russian ophthalmologist and Austria's first female doctor. She campaigned for women's right to study medicine in Austria.

== Family ==
Kerschbaumer-Putjata was born in 1851 in Moscow. Her father Wassilij Schlykow (1815–1875) was a Russian State Councillor and member of the Russian landed gentry and her mother was called Adelaida Ogarjowa (1826–1895).

At the age of 18, she married Vladimir Putjata, a student and official of the censorship department at the Moscow Post Office. They had three children and divorced in 1876. She married Austrian doctor Friedrich Kerschbaumer in 1877 and thereafter used the surname Kerschbaumer-Putjata.

== Education and career ==
Kerschbaumer-Putjata studied medicine in Switzerland, firstly at the Universität Zürich (University of Zurich) along with her sister Jenja. She achieved her doctorate from Universität Bern (University of Bern) in 1876 and trained in ophthalmology with Ferdinand von Arlt. Ten years before women were allowed to study medicine in Austria, Kerschbaumer-Putjata was granted a special permit by Emperor Franz Joseph I of Austria to work as a doctor in the country

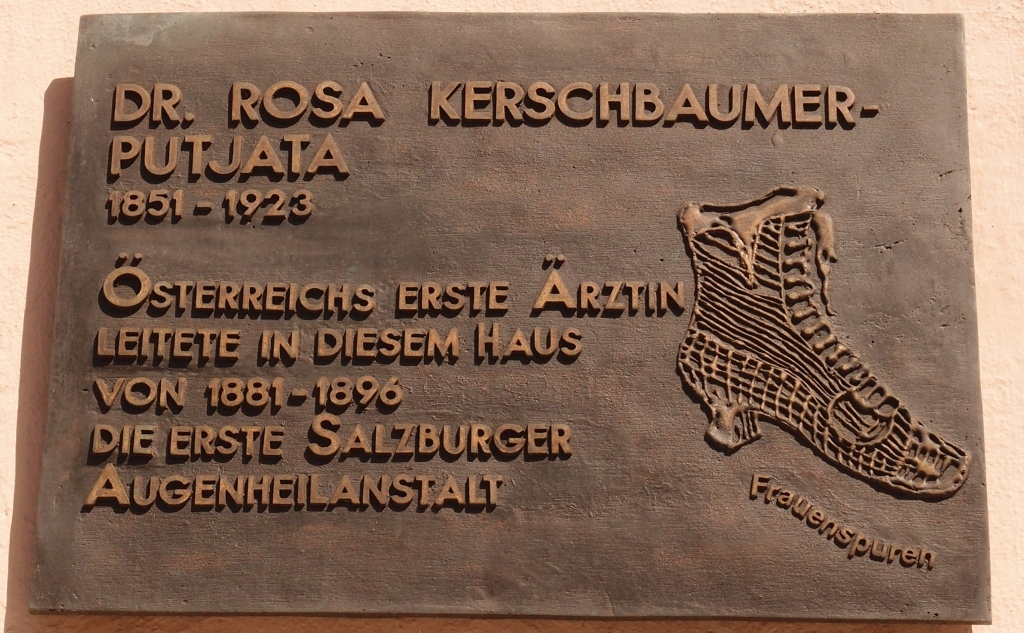
Remembrance plaque to Kerschbaumer-Putjata in Salzburg, Schwarzstraße 32

In 1881, using her own funds, Kerschbaumer-Putjata founded and ran an ophthalmology clinic on Schwarzstraße in Salzburg with her second husband. She cared for poor eye patients free of charge and campaigned for Austrian women to be allowed to study medicine. In 1896, Kerschbaumer-Putjata left Salzburg to head "mobile ophthalmological troops" in Russia and to teach at the medical academy in Saint Petersburg. Kerschbaumer-Putjata next became a physician in Tbilisi, Georgia, then returned to Austria in 1907.

Throughout her career in Europe, Kerschbaumer-Putjata travelled to the major international congresses for ophthalmology and attended meetings of the Ophthalmological Society. She always employed young female doctors when she held senior positions.

In 1911, Kerschbaumer-Putjata emigrated to the Seattle, Washington, United States of America, when she was aged 60. In 1915 she moved to Los Angeles, worked at the Good Samaritan Hospital and was a member of the Medical Society of the State of California. She died in Los Angeles, California, in 1923.

== Legacy ==
In 2008, a street in Salzburg was named in her honour.
