= Stefania Wolicka =

Polish adademician (1851-1937)

- Born: August 31, 1851; Warsaw, Kingdom of Poland
- Died: 1 April 1937 (aged 85); Warsaw, Poland
- Resting place: Powązki Cemetery, Warsaw
- Other name: Stefania Wolicka-Arnd
- Education: University of Zürich
- Spouse: Stanisław Arnd
- Children: Zbigniew Józef

Stefania Wolicka (1851–1937) was a Polish historian and the first woman awarded a Doctorate of Philosophy at the University of Zürich (in 1875).

== Biography ==
Wolicka, born in Warsaw (which from 1867 was within the Russian Empire) pursued her history degree despite the efforts of the Russian government of the time to prevent women from pursuing higher education. In 1873 she defied a decree ordering Russian women studying abroad to abandon their studies. Wolicka elected to continue her studies after her request for an exemption from the decree was denied. She petitioned the Minister of Education, Dmitry Tolstoy, directly, without success. The Russian government achieved the expulsion of several women students in Zürich, due to the political threat it saw in radical socialist activists called the "Fritschi Circle" (named after their Zürich landlady, Frau Fritsch). Some were put on trial in Russia, during the Trial of Fifty in 1877, leading to convictions and imprisonment for several. There is no evidence that Wolicka was ever part of this circle, and recent research indicates that some students in Zürich were listed as revolutionaries by the government based solely on the fact that they had attended university in Switzerland during the period 1872–73. However, Wolicka's name was on a list of 45 female Russian students sent to Tolstoy, who were all banned from teaching in the Russian Empire, forcing them to leave Switzerland by January 1, 1874.

According to University of Zürich records, Wolicka was from Posen (Poznań), and was born in Warsaw, and while she attended the University of Zürich, her parents were living in Zürich. Despite being forced to leave Switzerland, she received her Doctorate of Philosophy in 1875. Her doctoral dissertation is titled "Griechische Frauengestalten, 1.Teil" (Greek Figures of Women, Part 1). She has been called one of the "first Polish female academicians." Hulewicz noted that she belongs to the first generation of Polish female students, a generation that was composed "primarily of heroic individuals."

Wolicka married, and became known by the name Stefania Wolicka-Arnd. Her doctoral dissertation was published in 1875 by Zürcher und Furrer in Zürich. She became a noted writer on women's rights in Poland. In 1895, she published an article in the Polish law journal Athenæum titled "Twenty five years of the parliamentary struggle for the rights of women."

Wolicka was the first woman to earn a Doctorate of Philosophy degree in Europe in the modern era. The first woman known to receive a Doctorate of Philosophy in Europe is believed to be Elena Cornaro, who received her degree at the University of Padua in 1678. Universities in Switzerland were the first modern-era European universities to admit female students. Female scholars from Poland, Austria, Belgium, and other parts of Europe relocated to Switzerland in the late 19th century to enroll in university, such as Belgium's first female university graduate, physician Isala Van Diest.

== Bibliography ==
- Stefania Wolicka (1875). Griechische Frauengestalten. 1. Theil. Zürich. OCLC 48859610.
