= Lopez Expedition =

Attempt to take over Cuba from Spain

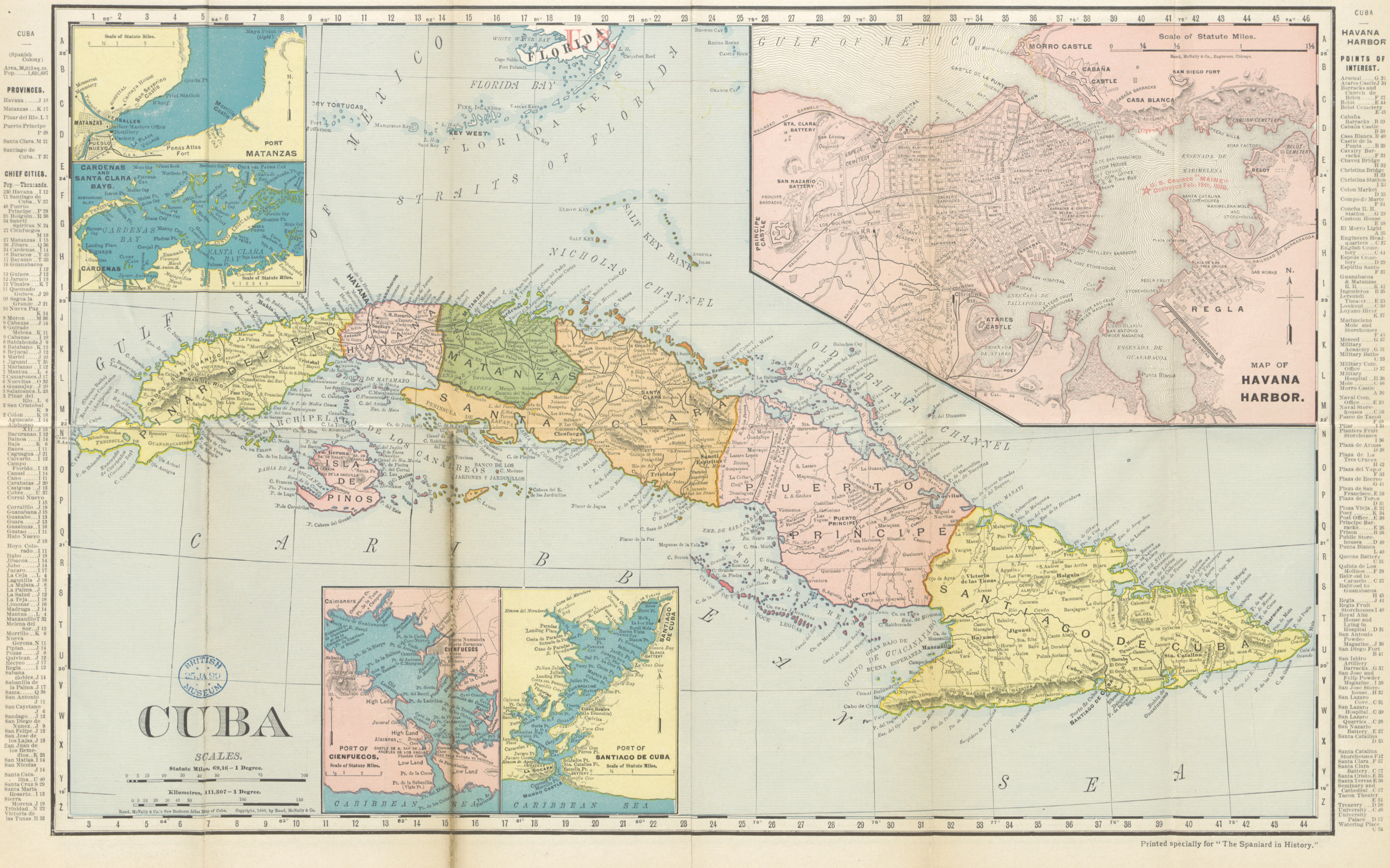
- Map of Cuba from the nineteenth century.
Date	May 1850 – August 1851
Location	Captaincy General of Cuba
Result	Spanish Cuba victory: Filibuster leaders executed

Belligerents
Filibusters	Captaincy General of Cuba

Commanders and leaders
Narciso López (executed); William Logan Crittenden (executed); Joaquín de Agüero (executed)	José Gutiérrez de la Concha

The Lopez Expedition of 1851 was an attempt by the Venezualan, Narciso López, who lived in Cuba, to invade the island to overthrow what he believed was then unstable Spanish rule. López wanted to have Cuba annexed into the United States as another slave state. He and American Southern volunteers departed from New Orleans. The expedition was one of several that took place around that time by private operators known as filibusterers. They had widespread support from the American public eager to see the USA expand its influence southwards into the Caribbean.

In August 1851, after two failed expeditions, a force comprising 420 Cuban emigres and American volunteers landed in western Cuba, where the invaders were defeated and captured by the Spanish forces. López and many of the other prisoners were executed. It was part of a string of filibustering raids launched from American territory during the era, in violation of the Neutrality Act.

== Background ==
During the era of Manifest Destiny the territory of the United States expanded rapidly, most notably with the Mexican Cession of 1848. The same year President Polk made an offer to purchase Cuba for $100 million, which was rejected by Spain. Cuba was particularly coveted by Southern supporters of slavery, who believed that Cuba with its large population of slaves would bolster the political strength of the slave states if it were admitted to the Union. It was estimated Cuba would have thirteen or fifteen representatives in Congress. There were similar ambitions towards states of northern Mexico such as Tamaulipas, where it was believed the climate would suit the introduction of slaves, but Cuba had the advantage of an existing plantation economy.

The campaign to end Spanish rule in Cuba attracted support from a number of southern political figures who were later prominent Confederates including Jefferson Davis. The northern Democrat Stephen Douglas also supported annexation. Democrats made it a political issue, with Southern Whigs also loudly stating their commitment to taking Cuba. The cause of Cuba was compared to that of the Texas Republic which had won its independence in 1836 before joining the United States.

However, the new Whig administration renounced any plan to buy Cuba from Spain. Increasingly those who wished to acquire the island turned towards seizing Cuba by force. They received strong backing from Mississippi Governor John Quitman, who formed an alliance with the Venezuelan-born adventurer Narciso López. López had contacts with potential insurgents in Cuba, but many of them favoured full independence rather than annexation.

An initial expedition in 1849 assembled near Pascagoula was prevented from sailing by American authorities. Shifting his base from New York City to New Orleans where there was much greater support for filibustering, López launched a second expedition in 1850. His attempts to persuade Jefferson Davis, John Quitman or Robert E. Lee to take command were rejected, and López oversaw it himself. Reaching Cárdenas he landed, burned the governor's mansion and raised the Cuban flag for the first time. An expected uprising by Cuban revolutionaries did not occur and the filibusters rapidly fled back to Florida pursued by the Spanish Navy. Five Americans who were left behind were executed. Lopez, Quitman and others were prosecuted for violating the Neutrality Act but a jury in New Orleans, where they were wildly popular for their efforts, acquitted one of their conspirators and the remaining indictments were dropped.

== Expedition ==
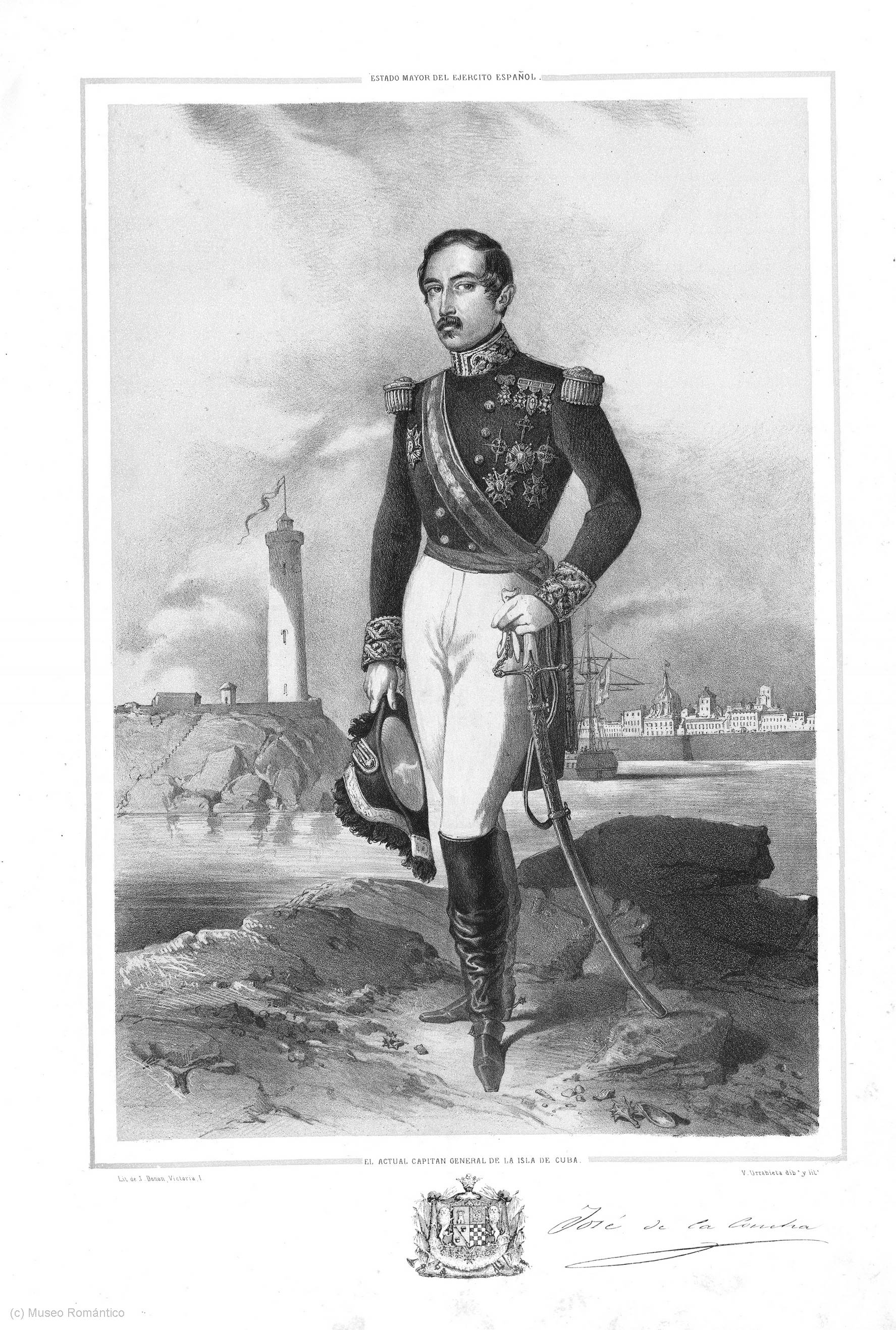
José Gutiérrez de la Concha, Captain General of Cuba, defeated the invaders and executed their leaders.

López immediately began efforts to launch another attempt, gathering financing and fresh recruits. This time Quitman kept his distance from the plot. As before many of the recruits were veterans of the Mexican War, while a number of Hungarian exiles also enlisted. López gave command of a regiment of American volunteers to William Logan Crittenden, a nephew of the Attorney General John J. Crittenden. López never clarified whether the ultimate goal of the expedition was to be Cuban independence or annexation by America, drawing supporters of both outcomes into his movement. Inspired by news of uprisings breaking out in Cuba, López hurried the preparations of his fresh invasion. The expedition departed from New Orleans on 3 August 1851.

By the time the expedition landed at Pinar del Río Province in western Cuba, the Spanish Army had already defeated the uprisings which had been more limited than American newspapers reported. Their leader Joaquín de Agüero was taken and executed. Well-prepared for López this time, Spanish troops under Captain General José Gutiérrez de la Concha defeated the filibusters in several engagements. They killed around 200 of them and took the rest prisoner. López compounded his problems by dividing his small force, with Crittenden operating separately before their defeat.

The prisoners were taken to Havana, where López was tried for treason and garroted in front of thousands of spectators. Crittenden and 50 other Americans were lined up and shot in the city's Old Square. Most of the remaining prisoners were sentenced to hard labor in the quicksilver mines of Ceuta, a Spanish city in North Africa. They were released a year later.

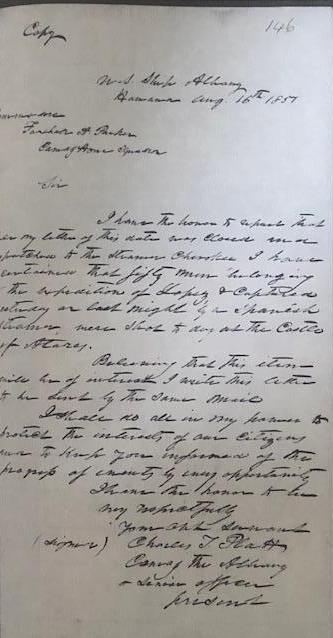
Charles Platt of USS Albany to Commodore Parker 1Home Squadron 6 Aug 1851, re fifty men captured and shot

== Aftermath ==
The expedition fought under the recently-designed Flag of Cuba.

In reaction mobs rioted in New Orleans, destroying the Spanish consulate and ransacking Spanish-owned shops. Despite the inflamed public mood in the south, the administration of Millard Fillmore was embarrassed by the failure to prevent the expedition from sailing in the first place and confined itself to securing the release of remaining American prisoners still in Spanish hands.

American attempts to acquire Cuba continued, set out in the Ostend Manifesto of 1854. Quitman also prepared a fresh filibustering expedition, this time with the tacit support of new President Franklin Pierce. Although this was called off under diplomatic pressure, and opposition by Northern free soilers, attempts to purchase Cuba continued until the Civil War broke out. In the wake of López's attack on Cuba, a string of filibusters launched attempts in the Gulf of Mexico and beyond, most notably William Walker.

In 1854 southern socialite Lucy Pickens wrote a novel The Free Flag of Cuba which provided a romanticized account of the expedition.
