= Captaincy General of Cuba =

1607–1898 Spanish possession in the Caribbean

Coordinates: 23°07′N 82°21′W

Captaincy General of Cuba Capitanía General de Cuba (Spanish)
- 1607–1898
- Flag Coat of arms (19th century)
- Motto: Plus ultra "Further Beyond"
- Anthem: Marcha Real "Royal March"
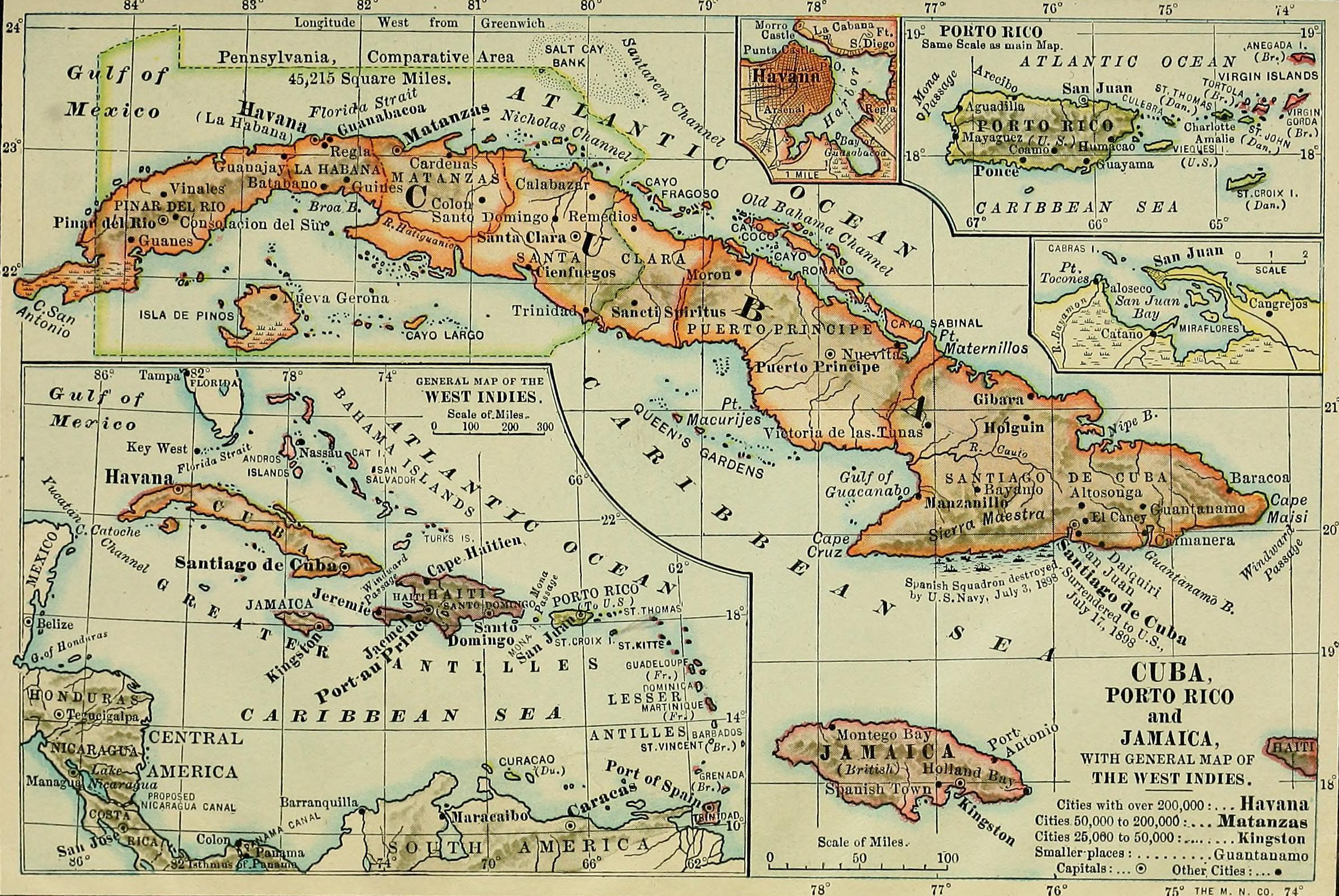
- 1902 map of the Captaincy General of Cuba

- Viceroyalty of New Spain in 1794, with the Captaincy General of Cuba shown in purple
- Status: Colony and Captaincy general of the Spanish Empire
- Capital: Havana (San Cristóbal de la Habana)
- Official languages: Spanish
- Common languages: Cuban Spanish; Haitian Creole (from 18th century); Taíno (Almost extinct by 17th and 19th century)
- Religion: Roman Catholicism; Santería; Judaism
- Government: Monarchy
- King
  - 1759–1788: Charles III
  - 1886–1898: Alfonso XIII; Maria Christina of Austria (Regent)
- Captain General
  - 1764–1779: Count of Ricla
  - 1887–1898: Ramón Blanco y Erenas
- Historical era: Spanish colonization of the Americas
  - Administrative reorganisation: 1607
  - Treaty of Paris: December 10 1898

Population
  - 1887 census: 1,631,687
- Currency: Spanish dollar Spanish peseta (from 1868)
Preceded by	Succeeded by
Governorate of Cuba	1868/1895: Republic of Cuba in Arms; 1898: Military Government of Cuba
- Today part of: Cuba; Guantanamo Bay Naval Base

The Captaincy General of Cuba (Spanish: Capitanía General de Cuba) was an administrative district of the Spanish Empire created in 1607 as part of Habsburg Spain's attempt to better defend and administer its Caribbean possessions. The reform also established captaincies general in Puerto Rico, Guatemala and Yucatán.

The restructuring of the Captaincy General in 1764 was the first example of the Bourbon Reforms in America. The changes included adding the provinces of Florida and Louisiana and granting more autonomy to these provinces. This later change was carried out by the Count of Floridablanca under Charles III to strengthen the Spanish position vis-a-vis the British in the Caribbean. A new governor-captain general based in Havana oversaw the administration of the new district. The local governors of the larger Captaincy General had previously been overseen in political and military matters by the president of the Audiencia of Santo Domingo. This audiencia retained oversight of judicial affairs until the establishment of new audiencias in Puerto Príncipe (1800) and Havana (1838).

In 1825, as a result of the loss of the mainland possessions, the Spanish government granted the governors-captain generals of Cuba extraordinary powers in matters of administration, justice and the treasury and in the second half of the 19th century gave them the title of Governor General.

== History ==
=== Antecedents ===
Since the 16th century the island of Cuba had been under the control of the governor-captain general of Santo Domingo, who was at the same time, president of the audiencia there. He oversaw the local governor and the Santo Domingo Audiencia heard appeals from the island.

The conquest of Cuba was organized in 1510 by the recently restored Viceroy of the Indies, Diego Columbus (Diego Colón), under the command of Diego Velázquez de Cuéllar, who became Cuba's first governor until his death in 1524. The new settlers did not wish to be under the personal authority of Colón, so Velázquez founded the city of Nuestra Señora de la Asunción de Baracoa in 1511 and convoked a general cabildo (a local government council), which was duly authorized to deal directly with Spain. This legal move removed Velázquez and the settlers from under the authority of Colón, their nominal superior. It was a precedent that would come back to haunt Velázquez during Hernán Cortés's conquest of the Aztec Empire. Other cities were later founded under Velázquez: Bayamo in 1513; Santísima Trinidad, Sancti Spíritus and San Cristóbal de La Habana in 1514; Puerto Príncipe and Santiago de Cuba in 1515. After the Spanish conquest of the Aztec Empire, Cuba experienced an exodus of settlers, and its population remained small for the next two centuries.

In 1565 the Adelantado Pedro Menéndez de Avilés, who was also Captain General of the Spanish treasure fleet which rendezvoused in Havana, established the first permanent Spanish settlement in Florida, San Agustín, initially bringing the province under the administrative control of Cuba, although due to distance and sea currents, Florida's government was granted the right to correspond directly with the Council of the Indies.

The Church played an important role in the Spanish settlement of the Americas. Furthermore, since governors, as representatives of the King, oversaw church administration due to the crown's right of patronage, the church and state were tightly intertwined in Spanish America. The first diocese was established in 1518 in Baracoa and was made suffragan to the Diocese of Seville. The seat of the Diocese was transferred to Santiago de Cuba in 1522. In 1520 Pope Leo X established the short-lived Diocese of Santiago de la Florida (or "Santiago de la Tierra Florida"). In 1546 the Diocese of Santo Domingo was elevated to an Archdiocese and the Diocese of Santiago de Cuba was made suffragan to it.

=== Establishment ===
In 1607 Philip III created the Captaincy General of Cuba as part of larger plans to defend the Caribbean against foreign threats. The first captain general was Pedro Valdés. Around the same time other captaincies general were established in Puerto Rico (1580) and Central America (1609). Cuba was divided into two governorships with capitals in Havana and Santiago de Cuba. The governor of Havana was Captain General of the island. In 1650 Cuba received a large influx of refugees when the English captured Jamaica and expelled the Spanish settlers in the colony.

In 1756 the construction of ships for the Spanish Navy began with the establishment of an Intendancy of the Navy in Havana, which functioned as a royal shipyard.

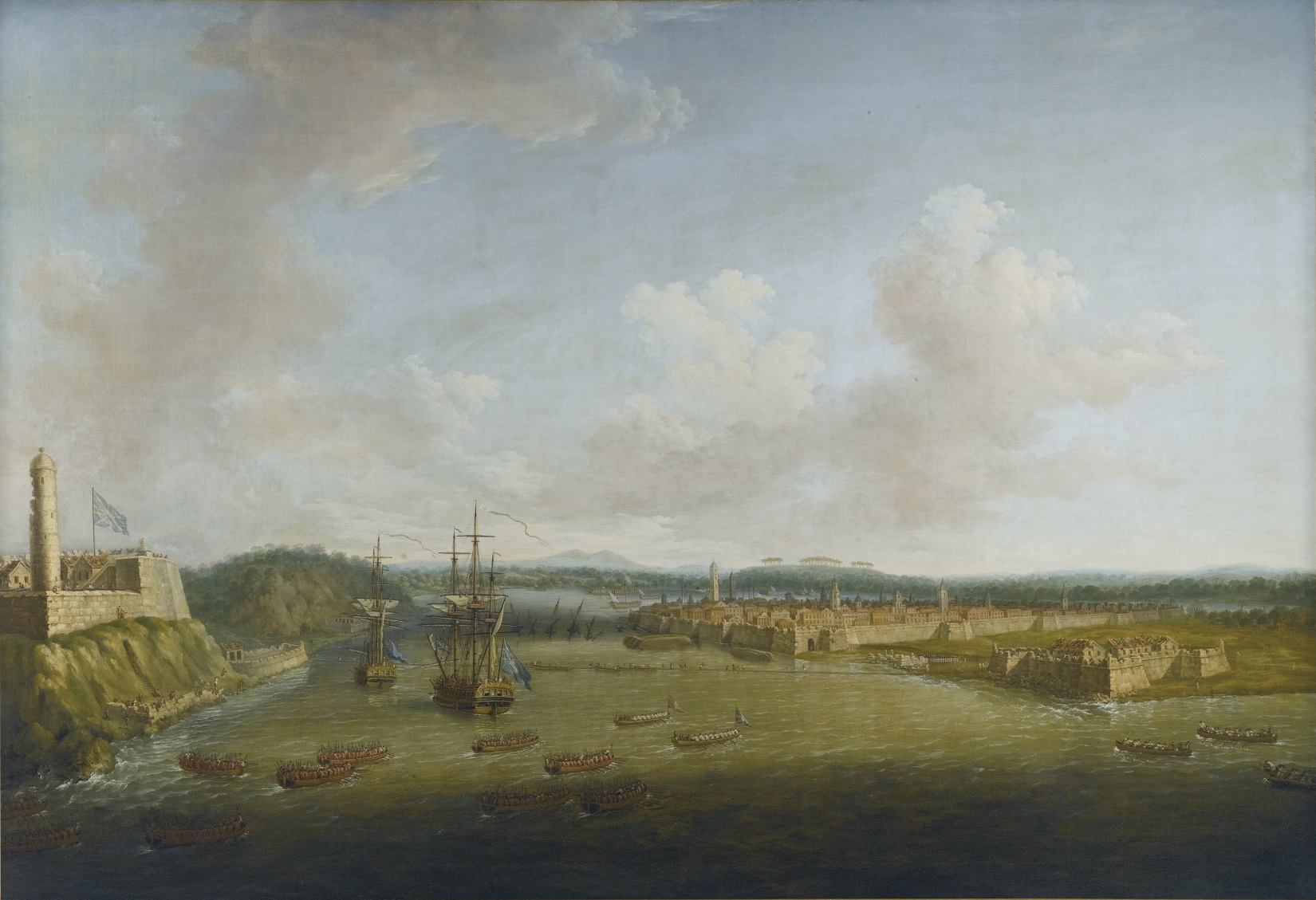
Havana after the successful British siege in 1762

The British capture of the island in 1762 during the Seven Years' War proved to be a turning point in the history of Cuba and Spanish America in general. The British captured Havana after a three-month siege and controlled the western part of the island for a year. Britain returned Cuba in exchange for Florida in the Treaty of Paris. The events revealed not only the weaknesses of the region's defenses but also proved just how much the Cuban economy had been neglected by the Spanish. During the year they controlled Cuba, the British and their American colonies conducted an unprecedented amount of trade with the island. A year earlier France had secretly ceded Louisiana Territory to Spain in compensation for its losses as its ally during the war.

As a sign of the seriousness with which the government took the problems, the very year the Spanish retook control of Havana construction began on what would become the largest Spanish fort in the New World, San Carlos de la Cabaña on the eastern side of the entrance to harbor of Havana.

=== The Bourbon Reforms ===
Starting in 1764 the government apparatus of Cuba was completely restructured. A report on the island was created by Alejandro O'Reilly, which provided the basis for the changes. A new emphasis was placed on appointing military men to the governorship-captaincy general of Cuba, many of whom were later rewarded with the post of Viceroy of New Spain. To aid the captain general of Cuba, the governor of Santiago was made captain general of the province and given command of the military forces there. At the same time a new institution, which up until now had only been used in Spain, was introduced into Cuba: the intendancy. An intendencia de hacienda y guerra was set up in Havana to oversee government and military expenditures and to promote the local economy. The first Intendant, Miguel de Altarriba arrived on March 8, 1765. Other intendancies soon followed: Louisiana (1766), Puerto Príncipe (1786) and Santiago de Cuba (1786). In 1774 the first census of the island was carried out, revealing 171,670 inhabitants, and other measures were taken to improve the local economy.

These reforms, especially the institution of the intendancy, initiated a dramatic social and economic transformation of the island during the last half of the 18th century and early 19th. Cuba went from being a defensive post in the Caribbean sustained by a subsidy from New Spain, the situado, to becoming a self-sustaining and flourishing, sugar-, coffee- and tobacco-exporting colony, which also meant that large number of slaves were imported into Cuba. The agricultural economy was aided by the gradual opening of Cuban ports to foreign ships, especially after the loss of the mainland due to the independence wars.

=== Territorial gains and losses ===
During the American Revolutionary War Spain recaptured colonial Florida (which at that time included Gulf Coast lands extending all the way to the Mississippi River) from Great Britain, which was ratified in the 1783 Treaty of Paris. But, within about 35 years, all of this territory was incrementally obtained by the U.S.; this was due in part to boundary disputes.

The transfer of the Spanish part of Santo Domingo to France in 1795 in the Treaty of Basel, made Cuba the main Spanish possession in the Caribbean. The Audiencia of Santo Domingo was formally moved to Santa María del Puerto Príncipe (today, Camagüey) five years later, after temporarily residing in Santiago de Cuba. (It resided in Havana for a few years starting in 1808 before returning to Camagüey.)

The Church also experienced growth. In 1787 a Diocese of San Cristóbal de La Habana was established, which included Florida and Louisiana in its territory. In 1793 the Diocese of Louisiana and the Two Floridas was established. Both were suffragan to the Archdiocese of Santo Domingo, but after the Treaty of Basel, it disappeared, so Santiago de Cuba was elevated to an Archdiocese with the above-mentioned dioceses suffragan to it, as well as the Diocese of Puerto Rico.

=== The 19th century ===
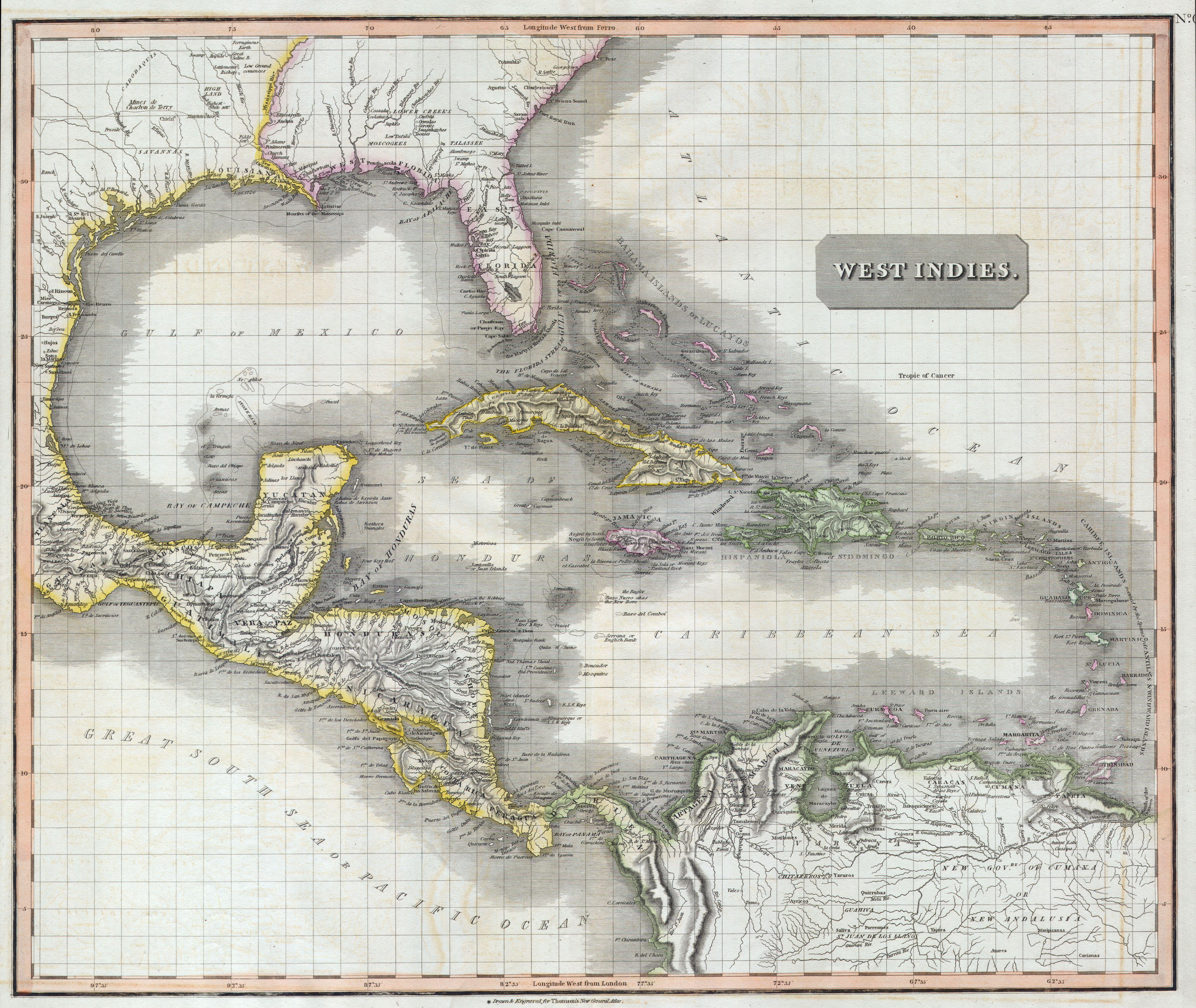
1814 map of the West Indies, including Cuba.

The Spanish Constitution of 1812, enacted by the Cortes of Cádiz – which served as a parliamentary Regency after Ferdinand VII was deposed – declared the territory of the Captaincy General an integral part of the Spanish Monarchy and transformed it into a province with its own elected diputación provincial, a governing board with joint administrative and limited legislative powers. Municipalities were also granted locally elected cabildos. The provincial deputation and cabildos functioned while the Constitution was in force from 1812 to 1814 and 1820 to 1823. Ultimately the Constitution was abolished by Ferdinand VII.

The death of Ferdinand VII brought about new changes. Regent María Cristina reconvened the Cortes, in its traditional form with three estates. In 1836, Constitutional government was reestablished in Spain, except this time the government in Spain, despite its liberal tendencies, defined the overseas territories as colonies, which should be governed by special laws. The democratic institutions, such as the Diputación Provincial and the cabildos, established by the 1812 Constitution were removed. The new Constitution of 1837 ratified Cuba's demoted status. However, the "special laws" by which the overseas areas would be governed were not drafted until three decades later, when a special Junta Informativa de Reformas de Ultramar (Overseas Informative Reform Board), with representatives from Cuba and Puerto Rico, was convened in 1865. Even then its proposals were never made into laws.

In the 1830s, judicial affairs were restructured. An Audiencia of Havana was created in 1838, with the jurisdiction of the Puerto Príncipe Audiencia limited to the east and center of the island. (The latter was temporarily abolished from 1853 to 1868.)

In 1851 the filibustering Lopez Expedition from the United States led by Narciso López and William Crittenden failed with many of the participants being executed. Three years later the territory was the subject of the Ostend Manifesto by which several American diplomats discussed a scheme to purchase Cuba from Spain, or even take it by force.

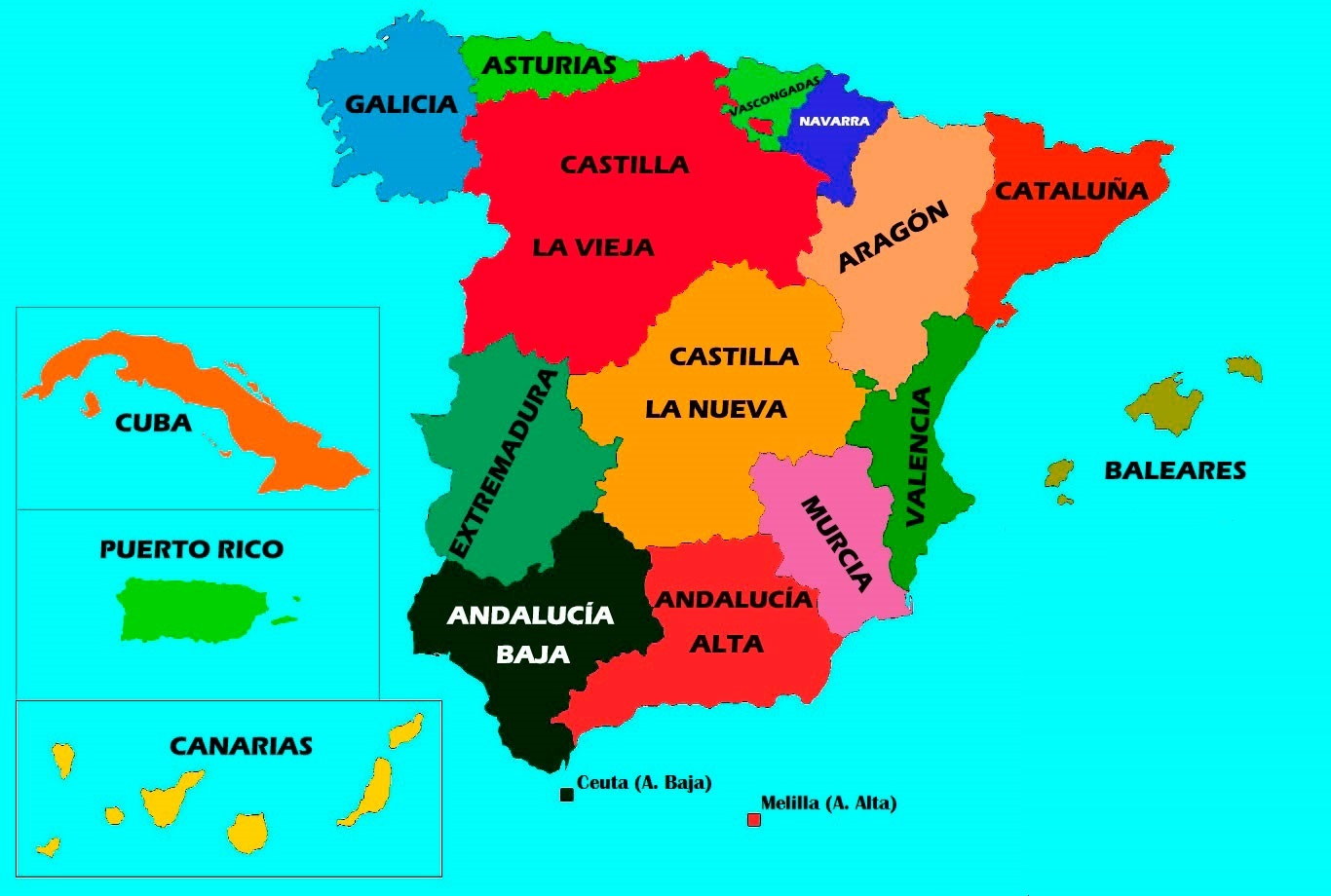
States proposed in the Spanish Draft Federal Constitution of 1873, among which Cuba was included.

By mid-century a definite pro-independence movement had coalesced, and Cuba experienced three civil wars in thirty years that culminated in a US intervention and the island's eventual independence: the Ten Years' War (1868–78), the Little War (1879–80) and the War of Independence, which became the Spanish–American War. During the last war the issue of autonomy came to a head. In 1895 the Overseas Minister, with approval from the Prime Minister, took the extra-constitutional step in 1897 of writing the Constitución Autonómica, which granted the Caribbean islands autonomy, technically bringing the Captaincy General to an end. Given the urgency of the movement, the government approved this unusual measure. The new government of the island was to consist of "an Island Parliament, divided into two chambers and one Governor-General, representative of the Metropolis, who will carry out his duties in its name, the supreme Authority." The new government functioned only for a few months before the United States took control of the island.

== Social dynamics ==
=== Population ===
The population of Cuba in 1899 when the Spanish rule had ended was 1,572,797 which was 9.2 times larger than the population in 1775 and during that year 171,620 people were reported living on the island.

In Cuba, the western part of the island became the most developed due to Havana's port traffic and its ensuing commerce. By 1763, Havana had a population of around 50,000 which made it comparable to Lima. By the year 1790, Havana and the area surrounding it had a population close to 100,000 which made it the 3rd largest urban area in the Americas and was bigger than other cities in the Caribbean.

=== Slavery and economics ===
Between 1790 and 1821, 240,721 slaves were imported to Cuba from Africa. By the mid-19th century the slave population in Cuba was close to a half of a million with most working in the sugar industry. Slavery in Cuba existed until being abolished in 1886.

Cuba's sugar trade in the 19th century dramatically grew and along with it so did the usage of slavery and number of slaves on the island. By 1830, Cuba was the world's largest producer of sugar. Also in 1830 the United States became Cuba's biggest trading partner as the US was cut off from its previous supply in the British West Indies and Hispaniola. Initially, sugar plantations were built around ports and in particular Havana because overland transport was costly, slow and difficult taking the form of large ox-cart trains transporting sugar. A railroad network was developed as a result of overland limitations with the first railroad line being built in 1837 between Havana and Güines spanning 82 kilometres (51 mi). The railroad allowed for the sugar industry to grow farther. The length of Cuba's railroad network grew from 618 kilometres (384 mi) in the 1850s to 1,218 kilometres (757 mi) by 1860.

With the elimination of the slave trade, imported Chinese contract laborers functioned as a replacement similar to other locations in the Caribbean. These laborers were exclusively male and recruited between the ages of 16 and 40 to serve for contracts ranging from 4 to 10 years. When Chinese laborers arrived in Cuba starting in 1847 they found themselves practically bound to the plantations and working under similar conditions to slaves whom previously worked their. When completing their contracts, some opted to stay in Cuba while others decided to return home to China. The practice of importing Chinese laborers lasted until the 1880s and 1890s.

The telegraph was introduced to Cuba in 1851 and a telegraph network was soon made covering the whole island. An underwater telegraph cable was installed between Florida and Cuba in 1867.

Havana functioned as a port city and military outpost with several thousand soldiers and sailors being stationed there permanently.

== Gallery ==
Coat of arms of the Captaincy General of Cuba (Savoyard rule, 1870 – 1873)

Royal Arms of Spain (Note: As depicted on the main portal of the Palace of the Captains General in Havana, arms in use until the transfer of the island to the US)

== See also ==
- List of colonial governors of Cuba
- Piracy in the Caribbean
- British expedition against Cuba
- History of Cuba
- Republic of Cuba in Arms

== Bibliography ==
- Kuethe, Allan J. (1986). Cuba, 1753–1815: Crown, Military, and Society. Knoxville: University of Tennessee Press. ISBN 0-87049-487-2.
