= List of islands of Nicaragua =

This is a list of islands of Nicaragua. There are 160 islands in Nicaragua on both the Caribbean Sea, Pacific Ocean and inland lakes.

== Islands ==
Caribbean Islands

- Corn Islands (Great Corn Island, Little Corn Island), 12°10′N 83°02′W
- Cayos Miskitos, 14°23′N 82°46′W
- Wounta Lagoon Islands
  - Suksuk Dakura
  - Nana Praya Ta
  - Mihmi Ta
  - Klisang Ta
- Mair Kayaska
- Bismuna Lagoon Islands
  - Waná
  - Sumpiki Dákura
  - Ninatara Dákura
  - Horse Pruan Dákura
  - Kaha Watla Dákura
  - Boom Tara Dákura
  - Tulu Watla
- Rama Cay
- El Bluff
- Isla del Venado
- Casaba Cay
- San Demetrio Island
- Half Way Cay
- Santa Lucia Island
- Mission Cay
- Teal Cay
- El Ahorcado Island
- Schooner Cay
- El Pigeon Cay
- Pearl Cays, 12°28′N 83°23′W
  - Calala Island, 12°26′15″N 83°25′56″W
  - Crawl Cay
  - Baboon Cay
  - María Crown Cam Cay
  - Grape Cay
  - Vincent Cay
  - Wild Cane Cay
  - Water Cay
  - Tungawara Cay
  - Little Tungawara Cay
  - Black Mangrove Cay
  - Buttonwood Cay
  - Maroon Cay
  - Columbilla Cay
  - Seal Cay
  - Billbird Cay
  - Askill Cay
  - Little Askill Cay
- Hog Cay Island
- Pigeon Cay
- King Cay
- Little King Cay
- Tyara Cay
- San Pío Cay

Pacific Islands

- Corinto Island
- Isla del Cardon
- Isla Encantada
- Isla del Cagado
- Maderas Negras Island
- Isla de Asserradores
- Farallones de Cosigüina
- Musard Island

(Lake Nicaragua)

- Ometepe Island
- Zapatera Island
- El Menco Island
- El Muerto Island
- Isla de Jesus Grande
- Isla Jesuito
- El Armado Island
- Isla del Plátano
- La Pedrera Island
- El Guanacaste Island
- El Anono Island
- Tinajón Island
- Tinaja Island
- Tinajiya Island
- Solentiname Islands
  - Island of Mancarrón
  - San Fernando Island
  - Isla Mancarroncita
  - La Venada Island
  - Isla de los Monos
  - Isla Redonda
  - La Juana Island
  - Chichicaste Island
  - Zapote Island
  - Zapotillo Island
- Islets of Granada
  - La Guanabana
  - Buenavista Island
  - El Arado Island
  - El Carmen Island
  - El Palenque Island
  - La Venada Island (Granada)
  - Hasbari
  - El Corozo
- El Boquete Island
- San Bernardo Island
- San Bernardito Island
- Islas el Nancital
  - Isla Grande
  - El Cedro Island
  - Arenal Island
  - Baja Island
  - Terrón Island
  - Coquito Island
- El Muerto Island
- Isla Redonda
- Isla Grande
- Isla La Flor
- Isla Las Rosas

(Lake Managua)

- Momotombito Island
- Isla Rosa
- Isla del Amor

(San Juan River)

- Pitazo Island
- Isla del Caño
- Isla Grande
- California Island
- Corbina Island
- Mendoza Island
- Nelson Island
- Anteguera Island
- Tigra Island
- Islas de las Culebras
- La Vainilla Island

== See also ==
- Geography of Nicaragua
