= Laguna Los Portillos =

Lagoon in Nicaragua

Los Portillos Lagoon
- Laguna Los Portillos (Spanish); Harbour Head (English)
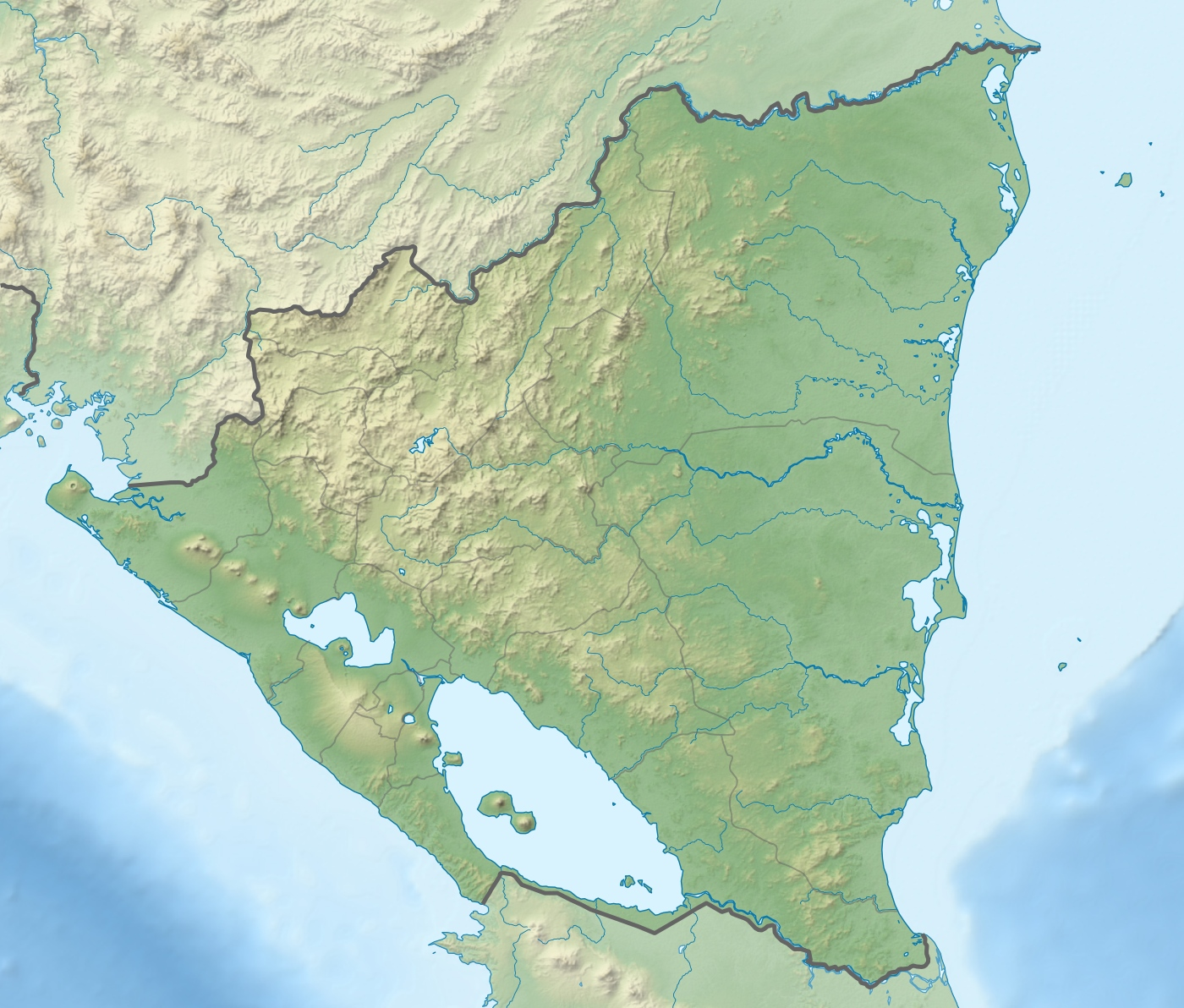
- Location within Nicaragua
- Coordinates: 10°55′49″N 83°40′16″W
- Type: lagoon exclave
- Primary outflows: Caribbean Sea
- Surface area: 0.46 km^{2} (0.18 sq mi)
- Surface elevation: 1 m (3 ft 3 in)

Los Portillos Lagoon (also known as Harbour Head) is a lagoon and a Nicaraguan exclave located within the coast of Costa Rica. Although it administratively belongs to the Río San Juan Department in Nicaragua, it is geographically surrounded by the Costa Rican province of Limón. The area, which is disputed between the two countries, is a wetland and lagoon that has historically been important due to its access to the Caribbean Sea and its strategic location for border crossings and water transport.

== Geography ==
Los Portillos Lagoon is located off the island of Isla Portillos and the northern top of Isla Calero in north-western Costa Rica, facing the Caribbean Sea. It came to be an exclave of Nicaragua as a result of a 2018 ICJ ruling on a territorial disputes between Nicaragua and Costa Rica over the mouth of the Río San Juan.

By land, it can only be accessed by passing through Costa Rican territory. It is controlled by the Nicaraguan Army and despite the international ruling, tensions and sporadic incidents persist along the border.

== History ==
Los Portillos Lagoon came about as a result of an international territorial dispute between Nicaragua and Costa Rica over the correct delimitation of their border at its east-end, and the interpretation of the navigation rights on the San Juan River established in the Cañas-Jerez Treaty of 1858. This exclave, located in northeastern Costa Rica on the border with Nicaragua, has been the subject of fierce debates and conflicts over the years.

In 2010, this escalated when Nicaragua carried out invasive construction projects in the region, including the excavation of canals to alter the flow of the San Juan River, affecting access to water and ecosystems in Costa Rican areas. Costa Rica responded by filing a complaint with the International Court of Justice (ICJ) in The Hague, arguing that Nicaragua's actions constituted a violation of its territorial sovereignty.

In 2015, the ICJ issued a ruling stating that Nicaragua had violated Costa Rica's sovereignty by clearing forests, creating canals, and establishing military camps on Costa Rican territory. The court ordered Nicaragua to pay compensation for environmental damages.

On January 16, 2017, Costa Rica filed a request to initiate proceedings against Nicaragua regarding a "dispute over the precise definition of the boundary in the Laguna Los Portillos area and the establishment of a new military camp by Nicaragua" on the beach of Isla Portillos and the amount of compensation to be paid by Nicaragua. On 2 February 2018, the International Court of Justice ruled that the total amount of compensation awarded to Costa Rica is US$378,890.59 to be paid by Nicaragua.

Also the ICJ rendered another decision in the border dispute between Nicaragua and Costa Rica regarding Isla Portillos. The court awarded the beach of Isla Portillos between the mouth of the San Juan river and Laguna Los Portillos to Costa Rica. Nicaragua was left with just the Laguna Los Portillos and its short strip of beach. The ICJ concluded that the whole beach was Costa Rican except for the part directly between the lagoon and the Caribbean Sea, thereby resulting to a tiny enclave of Nicaraguan territory separated from the rest of the country.

== Nature and climate ==
Los Portillos Lagoon is part of a larger wetland ecosystem that includes a diverse array of flora and fauna. The region is characterized by a rich variety of bird, reptile, and mammal species, making it an important site for ecological research and nature observation. Numerous species of waterfowl, as well as other species, attract nature lovers and scientists. The area also harbors numerous plant species that have adapted to living in conditions of high humidity and periodic flooding.

The climate in Los Portillos Lagoon is tropical, with high humidity and temperatures year-round. The area experiences two main seasons: the rainy season and the dry season. The rainy season typically lasts from May to November and brings abundant rainfall that is crucial for maintaining the local wetland ecosystems. The dry season runs from December to April and is characterized by less rainfall, which can lead to periods of drought.
