= Territorial disputes of Nicaragua =

Territorial disputes of Nicaragua include the territorial dispute with Colombia over the Archipelago of San Andrés, Providencia and Santa Catalina and Quita Sueño Bank. Nicaragua also has a maritime boundary dispute with Honduras in the Caribbean Sea and a boundary dispute over the Rio San Juan with Costa Rica.

== Colombia ==
=== San Andres y Providencia ===
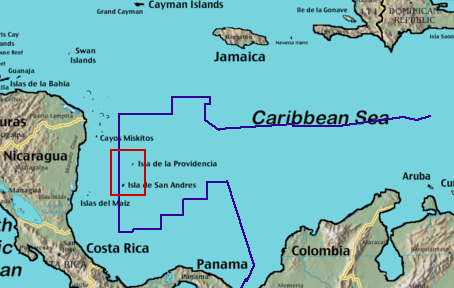
The location of San Andres and Providencia in the Caribbean.

In 1670 the English corsair Henry Morgan took over the islands until 1689. In 1803, during the Anglo-Spanish War (1796–1808), after Spain's Viceroyalty of New Granada had been re-established in 1739, the archipelago and south-eastern part of Mosquitia, from Cabo Gracias a Dios to the Chagres River, was placed under its military jurisdiction. In the later colonial era the territory was to be administered from the province of Cartagena.

After the Republic of Gran Colombia gained independence in 1822, the inhabitants of the islands – who had been under the control of Louis-Michel Aury – voluntarily adhered to Gran Colombia, and control over them was transferred to the department of Magdalena. Subsequently, the United Provinces of Central America (UPCA) did not recognize the occupation of the islands and claimed ownership over them.

Colombia in turn protested the UPCA's occupation of the south-eastern coast of Mosquitia. The UPCA federation dissolved in civil war between 1838 and 1840, and the resulting state of Nicaragua carried on with the dispute, as did the Republic of the New Granada (made up of modern Colombia and Panama) that emerged from the dissolution of Gran Colombia.

Colombia later established a local administration ("intendencia") in the islands in 1912. The signing of the Esguerra-Bárcenas treaty in 1928 between both governments temporarily resolved the dispute in favour of Colombia. (Colombia and Honduras signed a maritime boundary treaty in 1999 which implicitly accepted Colombian sovereignty over the islands.) However, since 1980, when the Sandinista government assumed power in Nicaragua, a constitutional reform was enacted and the treaty was renounced.

Nicaraguans claimed that the treaty was signed under United States pressure and military occupation and thus did not constitute a sovereign decision, while Colombia argued that the treaty's final ratification in 1930, when U.S. forces were already on their way out, confirmed its validity.

In 2001 Nicaragua filed claims with the ICJ over the disputed maritime boundary involving 50,000 km^{2} (19,000 sq mi) in the Caribbean, which included the islands of San Andrés and Providencia. Colombia had claimed that the ICJ had no jurisdiction over the matter and had increased its naval and police presence in the islands. In a preliminary decision the Court sided with Colombia on the question of sovereignty over the islands (47 km^{2} or 18 sq mi) and agreed with Nicaragua that the 82nd meridian (West) is not a maritime border.

On 19 November 2012, the ICJ decided this case by upholding Colombia's sovereignty over San Andres y Providencia, and other disputed islands. These included Quitasueño and Serrana, around which the court established territorial zones of 12 nautical miles (22 kilometres) in radius. The ICJ also expanded Nicaragua's maritime territory, thereby surrounding both island banks. The ICJ found that only one of 54 features identified by Nicaragua within Quitasueño Bank is an island at high tide. The ICJ considered that the use of enclaves achieved the most equitable solution. Fishermen worried that the court "had created 'enclaves' around Quitasueño and Serrana that could restrict the fishermen's longtime access there."

== Honduras ==
=== The Gulf of Fonseca ===
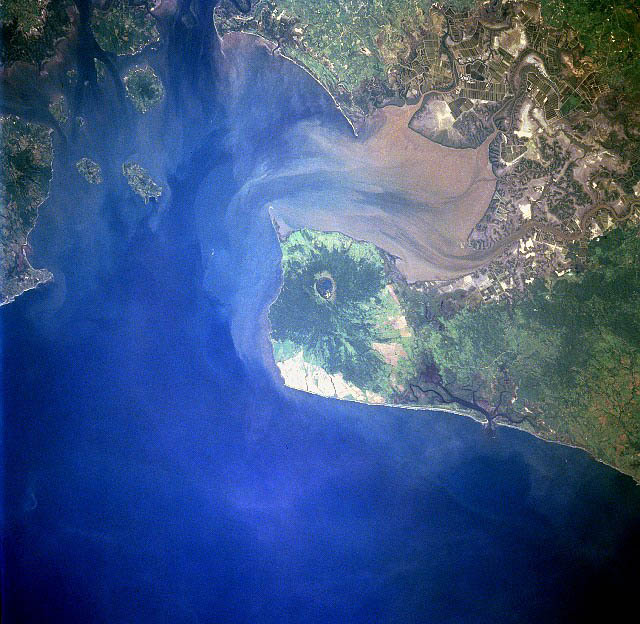
The Gulf of Fonseca from space, July 1997.

Nicaragua, Honduras and El Salvador have a coastline along the Gulf of Fonseca, a closed sea under international law, and have been involved in a lengthy dispute over the rights to the gulf and the islands located there. Each enjoys a 3-nautical-mile (5.6 km) littoral zone of sovereignty along its shores and islands in the gulf.

In 1992 a chamber of the ICJ decided the Land, Island and Maritime Frontier Dispute, of which the gulf dispute was a part. El Salvador was awarded the islands of Meanguera and Meanguerita, and Honduras was awarded the island of El Tigre. Nicaragua was not a party to that dispute and is therefore not bound by the decision.

The ICJ determined that Nicaragua, Honduras and El Salvador were to share control of the remaining water area in the gulf as a "tridominium" shared in common. The littoral zones abut each other in a way that forms two separate areas of tridominium waters in the gulf. The eastern area is bordered by the zones of all three countries. The larger western area (about 235 km^{2}) is bordered only by the waters of El Salvador and Nicaragua and the closing line of the gulf, such that one cannot travel within the gulf from Honduras to the enclosed western area except by passing through El Salvadoran and Nicaraguan waters.

All three nations are "entitled outside the closing line to territorial sea, continental shelf and exclusive economic zone. Whether this situation should remain in being or be replaced by a division and delimitation into three separate zones is, as inside the Gulf also, a matter for the three States to decide."

== Costa Rica ==
=== Boundary dispute along the San Juan River ===
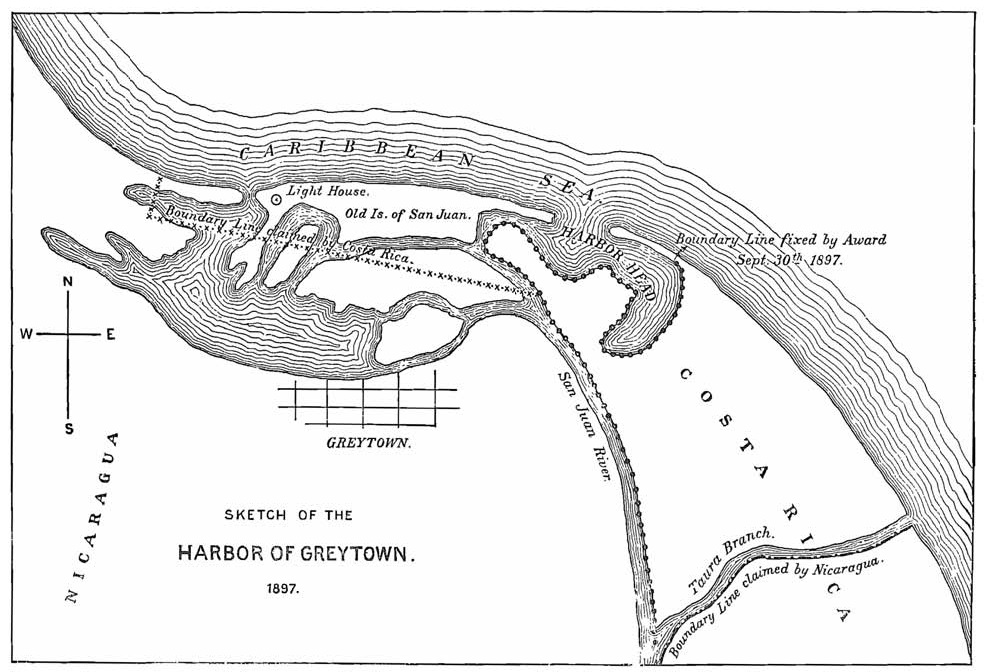
A sketch of the Greytown (i.e., San Juan del Norte) harbor area, contained in the first arbitral award given by Gen. Edward Porter Alexander on Sep. 30, 1897, indicating the boundary line between Nicaragua and Costa Rica as determined by that award. Alexander had been assigned by U.S. president Grover Cleveland to resolve the ambiguities in the location of the frontier set by the Cañas-Jerez Treaty of 1858.

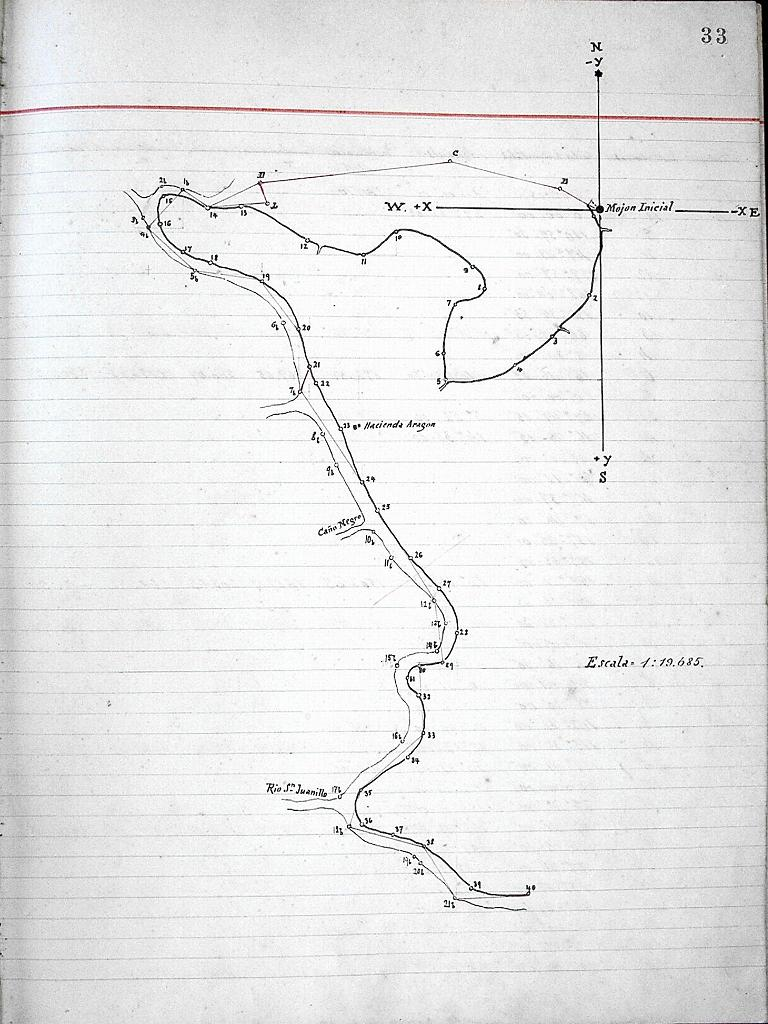
Map, dated March 2, 1898, from the official proceedings of the binational commission presided by engineer arbitrator Gen. Edward Porter Alexander, to define the frontier between the Republics of Nicaragua and Costa Rica.

According to the Cañas-Jerez Treaty of 1858, as reaffirmed and interpreted by the arbitration of U.S. president Grover Cleveland in 1888 and by the judgment of the Central American Court of Justice in 1916, the border between Nicaragua and Costa Rica runs along the right bank of the San Juan River, from its mouth in the Caribbean port of San Juan del Norte (also known as Grey Town), to a point located 5 km (3 mi) downstream from an old fortification known as Castillo Viejo ("Old Castle"), originally built to guard the access to Lake Nicaragua.

Nicaragua is therefore sovereign over all of the Río San Juan, but Costa Rica has the perpetual right to navigate with "purposes of commerce" over the part of the river where the right bank is the border between the two countries. Costa Rica also has the right to accompany shipments of merchandise with "revenue cutters" to help ensure the payment of tariffs (a stipulation which has been rendered obsolete by the free trade agreements among Central American countries), but president Cleveland's 1888 award denied Costa Rica the right to navigate the river with "vessels of war," except with the consent of Nicaragua.

The treaty of 1858 also states that no taxes would be imposed on Costa Rican trade in goods, except by mutual agreement. A dispute emerged in 1998 when Nicaragua forbade the transit of Costa Rican policemen in the river, which Nicaragua claimed to be a breach of sovereignty, and imposed a US$25 fee, as well as a visa requirement, for any Costa Rican tourists who entered the San Juan River, alleging that the Spanish language phrase con objetos de comercio, which had usually been translated (including in President Cleveland's awards) as "with purposes of commerce," in fact had to be read as "with articles of commerce," and that tourists were not "articles."

Costa Rica filed suit before the International Court of Justice (ICJ), in The Hague, which ruled in 2009 that con objetos de comercio had to be read as "with purposes of trade," and that Nicaragua had therefore breached its treaty obligations by preventing free navigation with purposes of commercial tourism. The ICJ also ruled that Costa Rican police forces did not have the right to navigate the San Juan River with arms and ammunition, or to use the river to resupply their posts along the right bank. The ICJ also ruled that Nicaragua was obliged to recognize a customary right by Costa Rican inhabitants of the right bank of the river to practice subsistence fishing.

Historically, the dispute over the San Juan River has been exacerbated by the possibility that it might become part of a Nicaragua Canal connecting the Atlantic and Pacific oceans. The opening of the Panama Canal in 1914, as well as Nicaragua's current construction of a dry ecocanal, have reduced the importance of the San Juan River as a possible route for interoceanic trade and have therefore, to some extent, eased the tensions between Nicaragua and Costa Rica over use of that waterway. Disputes between the two countries concerning the river and the associated frontier have nonetheless recurred in recent years.

=== 2010 Isla Calero dispute ===
A map depicting the border lines in the area near San Juan del Norte, as disputed by Nicaragua and Costa Rica, Oct. 2010. Note: the area shown as "Calero Island" is not that island.

In October 2010, a dispute began between Costa Rica and Nicaragua regarding the dredging of 33 kilometres (21 mi) of the San Juan River by the Nicaraguan government in the area of Isla Calero. Costa Rica claims that violation of its sovereignty took place as Nicaraguan troops had entered Costa Rican territory, and the dredging of the river caused environmental damage in the wetlands at Isla Calero, which is part of the island nature reserve, in an area that is owned by the Costa Rican Ministry of the Environment.

Nicaragua rejected all claims and replied that, in fact, Costa Ricans had been invading their territory. The Costa Rican government responded by sending 70 police reinforcements to the border area on October 22. Nicaragua stationed around 50 soldiers in Isla Calero

Costa Rica claimed it was a military incursion and presented a complaint before the Organization of American States (OAS). On November 12, by a vote of 22 to 2, the OAS ambassadors approved a resolution requesting Costa Rica and Nicaragua to pull out their troops from a conflict zone along their common border and to hold talks to settle their dispute.

Nicaragua's President Daniel Ortega discarded the possibility of withdrawing the troops and disregarded OAS resolution because his government considers that this organization does not have jurisdiction to resolve border disputes. On November 18, 2010, Costa Rica filed proceedings against Nicaragua in the ICJ.

=== 1825 Guanacaste Province ===
In an 1825 plebiscite, the region of Partido de Nicoya chose to be part of Costa Rica, becoming Guanacaste Province. Costa Rica annexed Guanacaste, in exchange for giving up its claims to sovereignty over the San Juan River and the Canal Route. However, when tensions between the nations rose over Costa Rica's rights of navigation on the river in 2013, Nicaraguan president Daniel Ortega claimed Guanacaste province belonged to Nicaragua.

== See also ==
- Foreign relations of Nicaragua
- Colombia–Nicaragua relations
- History of Nicaragua
