= Geography of Nicaragua =

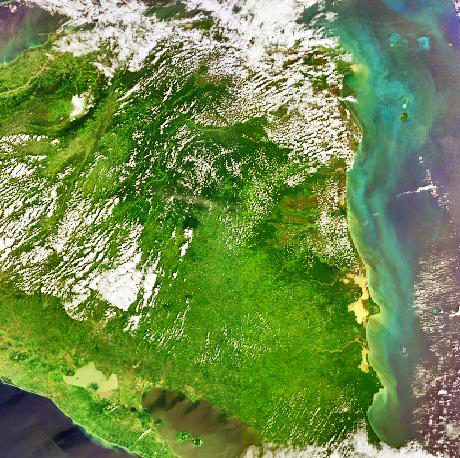
- Continent: North America
- Region: Central America
- Coordinates: 13°00′N 85°00′W
- Area: Ranked 96th
  - Total: 130,370 km^{2} (50,340 sq mi)
  - Land: 92.04%
  - Water: 7.96%
- Coastline: 910 km (570 mi)
- Borders: Total border: 1,231 km (765 mi)
- Highest point: Mogotón; 2,085 metres (6,841 ft)
- Lowest point: Pacific Ocean; 0 metres (0 ft)
- Longest river: Coco River; 750 km (470 mi)
- Largest lake: Lake Nicaragua; 8,264 km^{2} (3,191 mi^{2})
- Exclusive economic zone: 123,881 km^{2} (47,831 mi^{2})

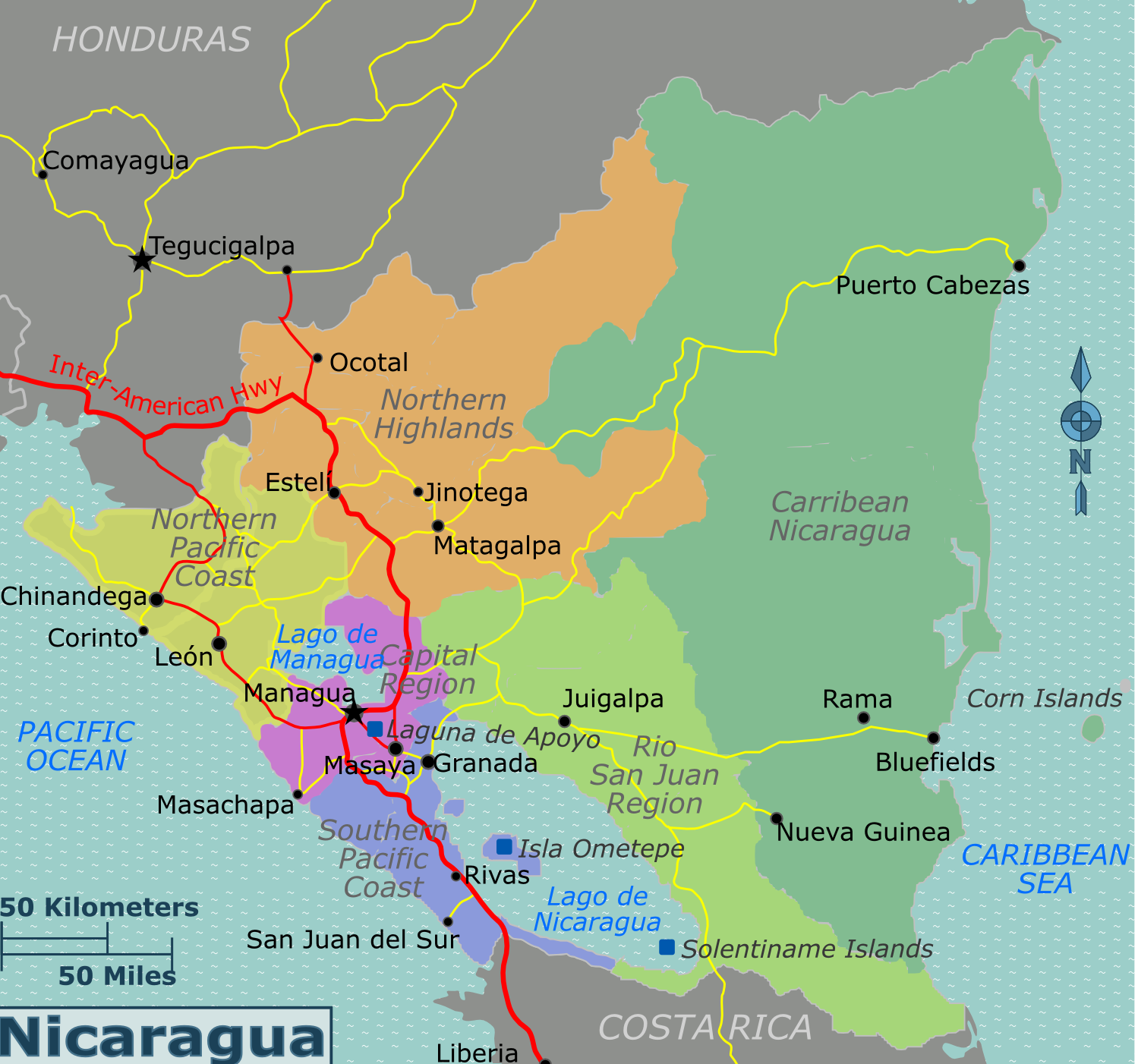
Regions of Nicaragua

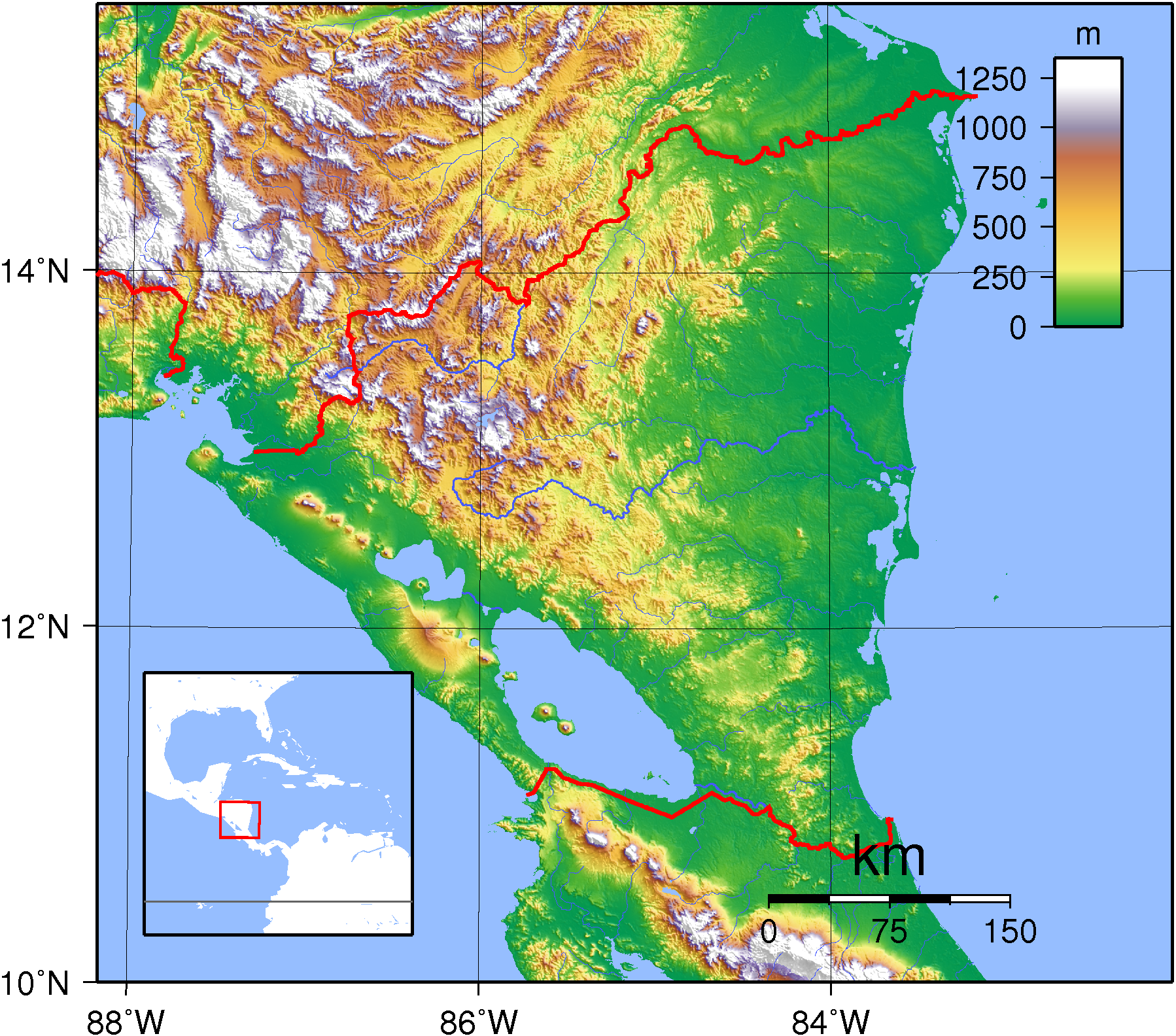
Topography of Nicaragua

Nicaragua map of Köppen climate classification zones

Nicaragua (officially the Republic of Nicaragua Spanish: República de Nicaragua [reˈpuβlika ðe nikaˈɾaɣwa]) is a country in Central America, bordering both the Caribbean Sea and the North Pacific Ocean, between Costa Rica and Honduras. Nicaragua is the largest country in Central America in square kilometers.

Nicaragua covers a total area of 130,370 square kilometers (119,990 square kilometers of which is land area) and contains a variety of climates and terrains. The country's physical geography divides it into three major zones: the Pacific lowlands, the wetter, cooler central highlands, and the Caribbean lowlands.

== Natural regions ==
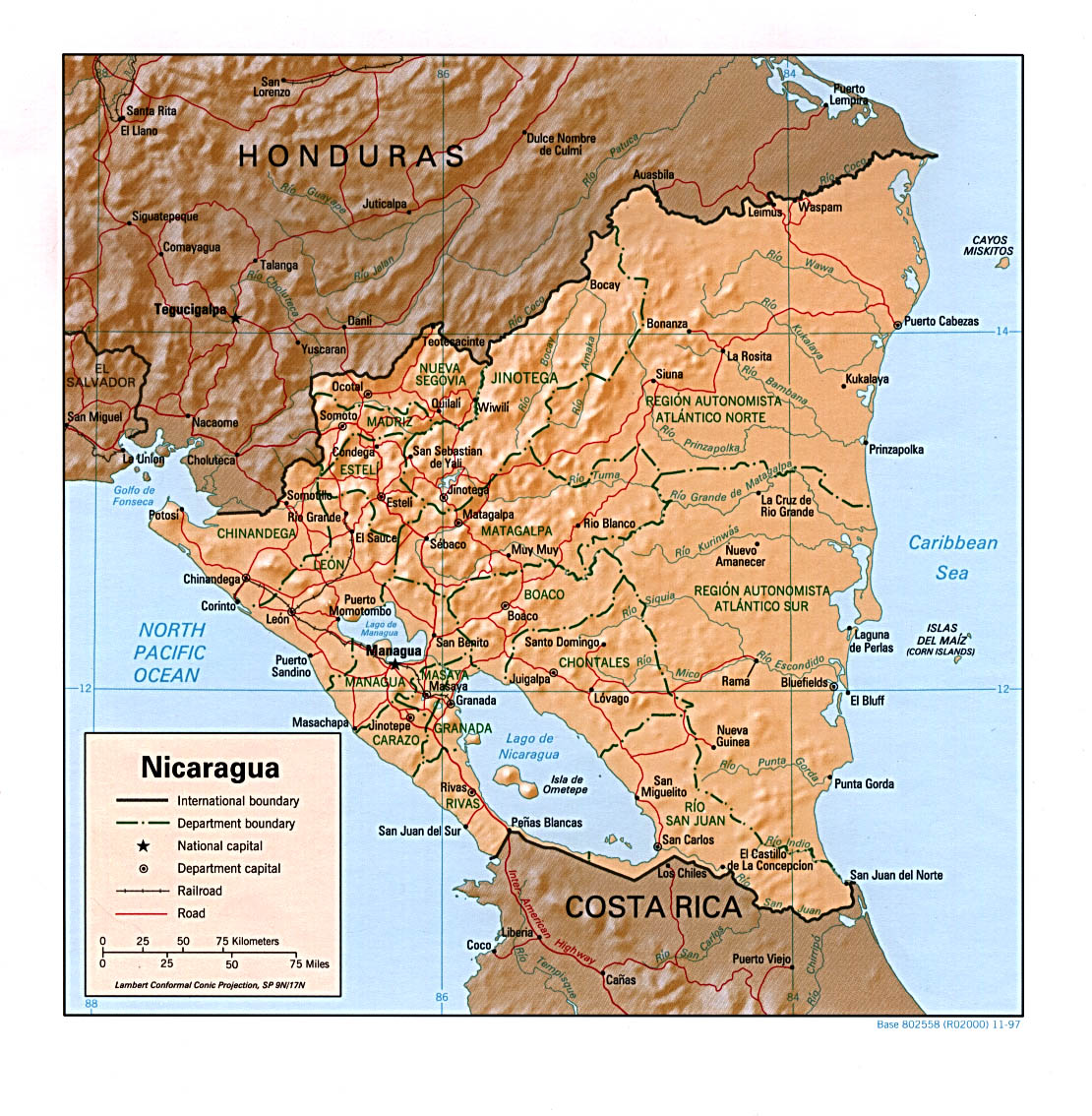
Shaded relief map of Nicaragua

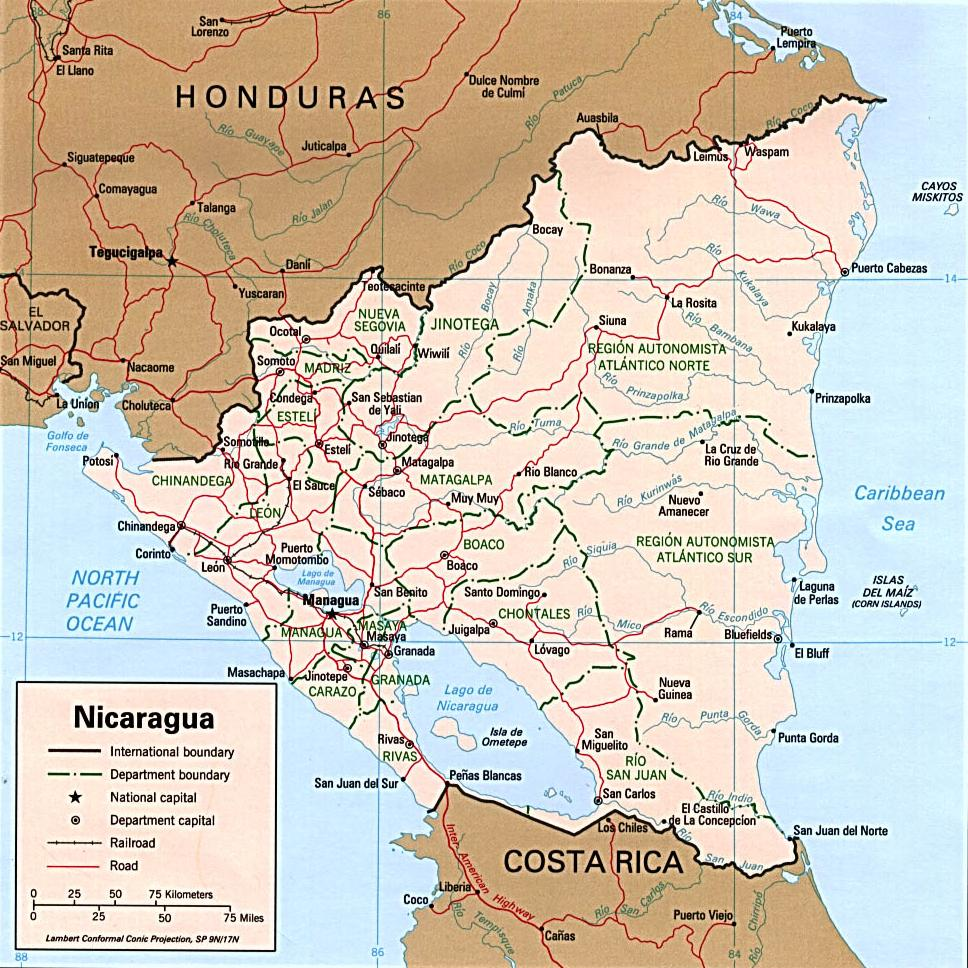
Political map of Nicaragua

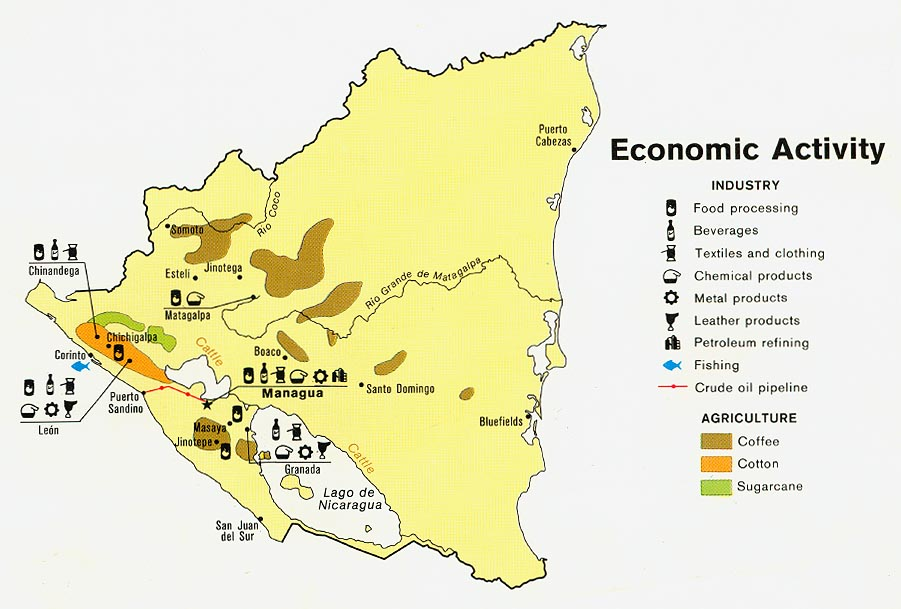
Economic activity map of Nicaragua, 1979

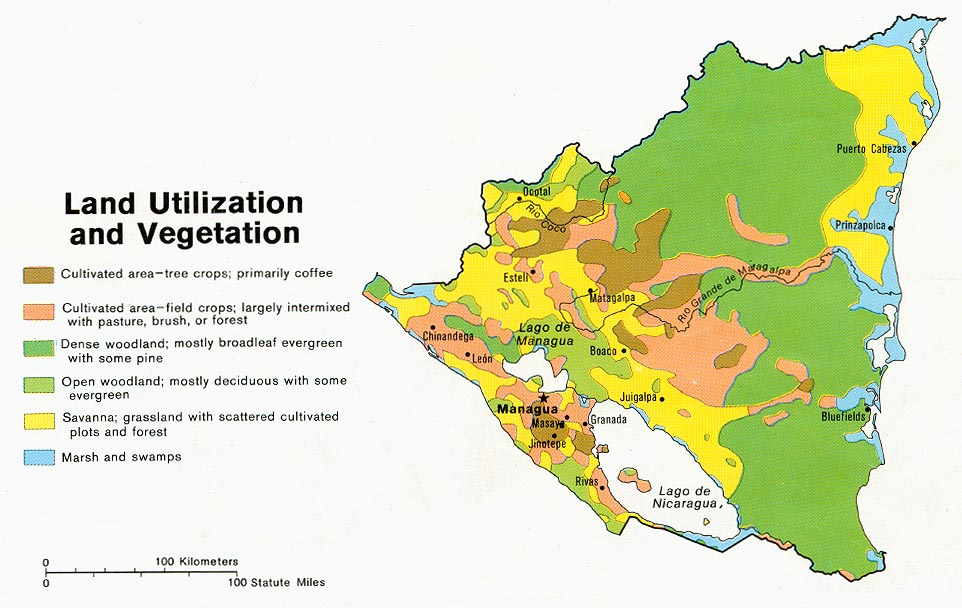
Land use map of Nicaragua, 1979

The natural regions of Nicaragua are the Pacific lowlands, central highlands, and Caribbean lowlands.

=== Pacific lowlands ===
The Pacific lowlands extend to about 75 kilometers inland from the Pacific coast. Most of the area is flat, except for a line of young volcanoes, many of which are still active, running between the Golfo de Fonseca and Lago de Nicaragua. These peaks lie just west of a large crustal fracture or structural rift that forms a long, narrow depression passing southeast across the isthmus from the Golfo de Fonseca to the Río San Juan.

The rift is occupied in part by the largest freshwater lakes in Central America: Lago de Managua (56 kilometers long and 24 kilometers wide) and Lago de Nicaragua (about 160 kilometers long and 75 kilometers wide). These two lakes are joined by the Río Tipitapa, which flows south into Lago de Nicaragua. Lago de Nicaragua in turn drains into the Río San Juan (the boundary between Nicaragua and Costa Rica), which flows through the southern part of the rift lowlands to the Caribbean Sea.

The valley of the Río San Juan forms a natural passageway close to sea level across the Nicaraguan isthmus from the Caribbean Sea to Lago de Nicaragua and the rift. From the southwest edge of Lago de Nicaragua, it is only nineteen kilometers to the Pacific Ocean. This route was considered as a possible alternative to the Panama Canal at various times in the past.

Surrounding the lakes and extending northwest of them along the rift valley to the Golfo de Fonseca are fertile lowland plains highly enriched with volcanic ash from nearby volcanoes. These lowlands are densely populated and well cultivated. The natural vegetation of the Pacific lowlands is dry forest, but much of it has been converted to agriculture or pasture. More directly west of the lake region is a narrow line of ash-covered hills and volcanoes that separate the lakes from the Pacific Ocean. This line is highest in the central portion near the cities of León and Managua.

Because Western Nicaragua is located where two major tectonic plates collide, it is subject to earthquakes and volcanic eruptions. Although periodic volcanic eruptions have caused agricultural damage from fumes and ash, earthquakes have been by far more destructive to life and property. Hundreds of shocks occur each year, some of which cause severe damage. The capital city of Managua was virtually destroyed in 1931 and again in 1972.

=== Central highlands ===
The triangular area known as the central highlands lies northeast and east of the Pacific lowlands. These rugged mountains are composed of ridges 900 to 1,800 meters high and a mixed forest of oak and pine alternating with deep valleys that drain primarily toward the Caribbean. Very few significant streams flow west to the Pacific Ocean. Those that do are steep, short, and flow intermittently.

The relatively dry western slopes of the central highlands, protected by the ridges of the highlands from the moist winds of the Caribbean, have drawn farmers from the Pacific region since colonial times. The eastern slopes of the highlands are covered with montane rain forests and are lightly populated with pioneer agriculturalists and small communities of indigenous people.

=== Caribbean lowlands ===
The eastern Caribbean lowlands of Nicaragua form the extensive (occupying more than 50 percent of national territory) and still sparsely settled lowland area known as the Costa de Mosquitos (Miskito Coast). The Caribbean lowlands are sometimes considered synonymous with the former department of Zelaya, which is now divided into the North Caribbean Coast Autonomous Region (Región Autónoma de la Costa Caribe Norte, RACCN) and the South Caribbean Coast Autonomous Region (Región Autónoma de la Costa Caribe Sur, RACCS) and constitutes about 45 percent of Nicaragua's territory.

These lowlands are a hot, humid area that includes coastal plains, the eastern spurs of the central highlands, and the lower portion of the Río San Juan basin. The soil is generally leached and infertile. Pine and palm savannas predominate along the Caribbean coast as far south as the Laguna de Perlas. There are extensive areas of tropical rain forest, including the Isthmian–Atlantic moist forests extending southwards from the Laguna de Perlas past the Río San Juan into Costa Rica, and the Central American Atlantic moist forests lying between the savannas and the central highlands, and along rivers through the savannas.

Fertile soils are found only along the natural levees and narrow floodplains of the numerous rivers, including the Escondido, the Río Grande de Matagalpa, the Prinzapolka, and the Coco, and along the many lesser streams that rise in the central highlands and cross the region en route to the complex of shallow bays, lagoons, and salt marshes of the Caribbean coast.

== Climate ==
Temperature varies little with the seasons in Nicaragua and is largely a function of elevation. The tierra caliente, or "hot land", is characteristic of the foothills and lowlands from sea level to about 750 meters (2,461 ft) of elevation. Here, daytime temperatures average 30 to 33 °C (86 to 91 °F), and night temperatures drop to 21 to 24 °C (69.8 to 75.2 °F) most of the year.

The tierra templada, or "temperate land", is characteristic of most of the central highlands, where elevations range between 750 and 1,600 meters (2,461 and 5,249 ft). Here, daytime temperatures are mild (24 to 27 °C (75 to 81 °F)), and nights are cool (15 to 21 °C (59 to 70 °F)).

Tierra fria, the "cold land" at elevations above 1,600 meters (5,249 ft), is found only on and near the highest peaks of the central highlands. Daytime averages in this region are 22 to 24 °C (71.6 to 75.2 °F), with nighttime lows below 15 °C (59 °F).

=== Rainfall ===
Rainfall varies greatly in Nicaragua. The Caribbean lowlands are the wettest section of Central America, receiving between 2,500 and 6,500 millimeters (98.4 and 255.9 in) of rain annually. The western slopes of the central highlands and the Pacific lowlands receive considerably less annual rainfall, being protected from moisture-laden Caribbean trade winds by the peaks of the central highlands.

Mean annual precipitation for the rift valley and western slopes of the highlands ranges from 1,000 to 1,500 millimeters (39.4 to 59.1 in). Rainfall is seasonal—May through October is the rainy season, and December through April is the driest period.

During the rainy season, Eastern Nicaragua is subject to heavy flooding along the upper and middle reaches of all major rivers. Near the coast, where river courses widen and river banks and natural levees are low, floodwaters spill over onto the floodplains until large sections of the lowlands become continuous sheets of water. River bank agricultural plots are often heavily damaged, and considerable numbers of savanna animals die during these floods.

The coast is also subject to destructive tropical storms and hurricanes, particularly from July through October. The high winds and floods, accompanying these storms often cause considerable destruction of property. In addition, heavy rains (called papagayo storms) accompanying the passage of a cold front or a low-pressure area may sweep from the north through both eastern and western Nicaragua (particularly the rift valley) from November through March.

Hurricanes or heavy rains in the central highlands where agriculture has destroyed much of the natural vegetation also cause considerable crop damage and soil erosion. In 1988, Hurricane Joan forced hundreds of thousands of Nicaraguans to flee their homes and caused more than US$1 billion in damage, most of it along the Caribbean coast. In November 2020, two major hurricanes: Eta and Iota, made landfall on the nation in nearly same locations in consecutive weeks, causing hundreds of deaths throughout the Caribbean region and causing millions of dollars in damage.

=== Examples ===
Climate data for Managua (extremes 1952-present)
Month	Jan	Feb	Mar	Apr	May	Jun	Jul	Aug	Sep	Oct	Nov	Dec	Year
Record high °C (°F)	37.0 (98.6)	37.1 (98.8)	37.8 (100.0)	38.5 (101.3)	38.5 (101.3)	37.5 (99.5)	39.2 (102.6)	35.7 (96.3)	36.5 (97.7)	36.6 (97.9)	35.4 (95.7)	36.2 (97.2)	39.2 (102.6)
Mean daily maximum °C (°F)	31.0 (87.8)	32.1 (89.8)	33.6 (92.5)	34.3 (93.7)	34.0 (93.2)	31.4 (88.5)	30.9 (87.6)	31.4 (88.5)	30.3 (86.5)	30.8 (87.4)	30.6 (87.1)	30.8 (87.4)	31.8 (89.2)
Daily mean °C (°F)	26.3 (79.3)	27.2 (81.0)	28.5 (83.3)	29.3 (84.7)	29.3 (84.7)	27.2 (81.0)	26.8 (80.2)	27.2 (81.0)	26.8 (80.2)	26.5 (79.7)	26.3 (79.3)	26.2 (79.2)	27.3 (81.1)
Mean daily minimum °C (°F)	20.4 (68.7)	20.6 (69.1)	21.7 (71.1)	22.6 (72.7)	23.4 (74.1)	23.0 (73.4)	22.6 (72.7)	22.4 (72.3)	22.2 (72.0)	22.1 (71.8)	20.9 (69.6)	20.0 (68.0)	21.8 (71.2)
Record low °C (°F)	15.0 (59.0)	15.2 (59.4)	17.2 (63.0)	19.0 (66.2)	16.0 (60.8)	20.0 (68.0)	20.0 (68.0)	19.0 (66.2)	15.0 (59.0)	17.0 (62.6)	15.0 (59.0)	16.2 (61.2)	15.0 (59.0)
Average rainfall mm (inches)	9 (0.4)	5 (0.2)	3 (0.1)	8 (0.3)	130 (5.1)	224 (8.8)	144 (5.7)	136 (5.4)	215 (8.5)	280 (11.0)	42 (1.7)	8 (0.3)	1,204 (47.4)
Average rainy days (≥ 0.1 mm)	4	2	2	2	10	22	20	17	20	19	10	5	133
Average relative humidity (%)	69	64	62	61	70	80	79	81	82	83	78	73	73
Mean monthly sunshine hours	263.5	254.2	291.4	276.0	229.4	186.0	151.9	195.3	210.0	223.2	231.0	248.0	2,759.9
Mean daily sunshine hours	8.5	9.0	9.4	9.2	7.4	6.2	4.9	6.3	7.0	7.2	7.7	8.0	7.6
Source 1: Deutscher Wetterdienst
Source 2: Meteo Climat (record highs and lows)

Climate data for Bluefields
Month	Jan	Feb	Mar	Apr	May	Jun	Jul	Aug	Sep	Oct	Nov	Dec	Year
Mean daily maximum °C (°F)	27.8 (82.0)	28.4 (83.1)	29.0 (84.2)	29.8 (85.6)	29.9 (85.8)	28.9 (84.0)	28.1 (82.6)	28.5 (83.3)	29.1 (84.4)	28.8 (83.8)	28.4 (83.1)	28.0 (82.4)	28.7 (83.7)
Daily mean °C (°F)	24.9 (76.8)	25.2 (77.4)	26.2 (79.2)	27.0 (80.6)	27.0 (80.6)	26.0 (78.8)	25.6 (78.1)	25.6 (78.1)	25.8 (78.4)	25.6 (78.1)	25.3 (77.5)	25.2 (77.4)	25.8 (78.4)
Mean daily minimum °C (°F)	22.2 (72.0)	22.3 (72.1)	23.3 (73.9)	23.7 (74.7)	24.2 (75.6)	23.9 (75.0)	23.7 (74.7)	23.6 (74.5)	23.5 (74.3)	23.1 (73.6)	22.8 (73.0)	22.6 (72.7)	23.2 (73.8)
Average rainfall mm (inches)	218 (8.6)	114 (4.5)	71 (2.8)	101 (4.0)	264 (10.4)	581 (22.9)	828 (32.6)	638 (25.1)	383 (15.1)	418 (16.5)	376 (14.8)	328 (12.9)	4,320 (170.2)
Average rainy days (≥ 1.0 mm)	19	13	10	10	15	23	26	25	21	21	20	22	225
Source: HKO

Climate data for Puerto Cabezas
Month	Jan	Feb	Mar	Apr	May	Jun	Jul	Aug	Sep	Oct	Nov	Dec	Year
Mean daily maximum °C (°F)	29.7 (85.5)	29.7 (85.5)	30.5 (86.9)	31.3 (88.3)	31.8 (89.2)	31.4 (88.5)	30.8 (87.4)	31.2 (88.2)	31.2 (88.2)	31.6 (88.9)	30.8 (87.4)	29.7 (85.5)	30.8 (87.5)
Daily mean °C (°F)	25.0 (77.0)	24.5 (76.1)	26.5 (79.7)	27.2 (81.0)	27.8 (82.0)	27.5 (81.5)	27.1 (80.8)	27.1 (80.8)	27.0 (80.6)	26.3 (79.3)	25.8 (78.4)	25.4 (77.7)	26.4 (79.6)
Mean daily minimum °C (°F)	18.8 (65.8)	18.6 (65.5)	19.8 (67.6)	20.9 (69.6)	21.8 (71.2)	22.0 (71.6)	21.9 (71.4)	22.0 (71.6)	22.2 (72.0)	21.6 (70.9)	20.8 (69.4)	19.3 (66.7)	20.8 (69.4)
Average rainfall mm (inches)	148 (5.8)	83 (3.3)	48 (1.9)	54 (2.1)	183 (7.2)	378 (14.9)	414 (16.3)	370 (14.6)	303 (11.9)	338 (13.3)	278 (10.9)	202 (8.0)	2,799 (110.2)
Average rainy days (≥ 1.0 mm)	16	11	7	8	12	20	23	22	20	20	19	20	198
Source: Hong Kong Observatory

== Environment ==
Nicaragua is subject to destructive earthquakes, volcanoes, landslides, and occasionally severe hurricanes. It currently faces deforestation, soil erosion, and water pollution. It is a party to the United Nations Framework Convention on Climate Change, the Climate Change-Kyoto Protocol, the Nuclear Test Ban, and the Ozone Layer Protection, and has signed but not ratified the Law of the Sea.

=== Tree cover extent and loss ===
Global Forest Watch publishes annual estimates of tree cover loss and 2000 tree cover extent derived from time-series analysis of Landsat satellite imagery in the Global Forest Change dataset. In this framework, tree cover refers to vegetation taller than 5 m (including natural forests and tree plantations), and tree cover loss is defined as the complete removal of tree cover canopy for a given year, regardless of cause.

For Nicaragua, country statistics report cumulative tree cover loss of 2,001,073 ha (20,010.73 km^{2}) from 2001 to 2024 (about 25.7% of its 2000 tree cover area). For tree cover density greater than 30%, country statistics report a 2000 tree cover extent of 7,773,867 ha (77,738.67 km^{2}). The charts and table below display this data. In simple terms, the annual loss number is the area where tree cover disappeared in that year, and the extent number shows what remains of the 2000 tree cover baseline after subtracting cumulative loss. Forest regrowth is not included in the dataset.

Annual tree cover loss in Nicaragua, 2001–2024. View chart definition.
Tree cover extent in 2000 minus cumulative tree cover loss in Nicaragua, 2001–2024 (loss-only residual; does not account for gain). View chart definition.

Annual tree cover extent and loss
Year	Tree cover extent (km2) (Note: This residual measure does not include forest regrowth.)	Annual tree cover loss (km2)
2001	77,297.78	440.89
2002	76,756.00	541.78
2003	76,286.56	469.44
2004	76,075.95	210.61
2005	75,124.60	951.35
2006	74,735.94	388.66
2007	73,851.16	884.78
2008	73,313.23	537.93
2009	72,482.45	830.78
2010	70,357.63	2,124.82
2011	69,924.83	432.80
2012	69,587.92	336.91
2013	69,147.62	440.30
2014	68,392.12	755.50
2015	68,036.91	355.21
2016	66,613.12	1,423.79
2017	64,496.13	2,116.99
2018	63,782.52	713.61
2019	63,004.24	778.28
2020	61,891.28	1,112.96
2021	60,972.93	918.35
2022	60,483.12	489.81
2023	59,307.75	1,175.37
2024	57,727.94	1,579.81

=== REDD+ reference level and monitoring ===
Under the UNFCCC REDD+ framework, Nicaragua has submitted a national forest reference emission level (FREL). On the UNFCCC REDD+ Web Platform, the country's 2019 submission is listed as having an assessed reference level, while the other Warsaw Framework elements - a national strategy, safeguards, and a national forest monitoring system - are listed as "not reported".

The FREL was submitted in 2019 and technically assessed in 2020. It covers three REDD+ activities at national scale - reducing emissions from deforestation, reducing emissions from forest degradation, and enhancement of forest carbon stocks - and uses a 2006-2015 historical reference period. Following the technical assessment and a modified submission, the assessed FREL was 14,436,009 t CO2 eq per year, revised from 16,510,883 t CO2 eq per year in the original submission. The technical assessment states that the benchmark represents the annual average of CO2 emissions and removals from the three included activities.

The modified submission used a forest definition of a continuous area of at least 1 hectare, with tree cover of at least 30 percent and average tree height above 4 metres; it explicitly included bamboo ecosystems, mangroves, natural palms, dry forests, riparian vegetation, and permanent crops with shade trees. The technical assessment reports that the FREL included above-ground biomass and below-ground biomass and reported CO2 only, while excluding deadwood, litter and soil organic carbon. Activity data were derived from visual interpretation of satellite imagery for 2005 and 2015 using a systematic sampling design linked to the national forest inventory grid.

== Extreme points ==
- Northernmost point: North of Liwa Sirpe
- Southernmost point: Trinidad, Río San Juan
- Westernmost point: Pacific coast at Gulf of Fonseca, Chinandega Department
- Easternmost point: Miskito Cays archipelago, North Caribbean Coast Autonomous Region
- Lowest point: Pacific Ocean 0 m
- Highest point: Mogotón 2,085 m

== Maritime claims ==
- Contiguous zone: 24 nautical miles (44.4 km; 27.6 mi)
- Territorial sea: 12 nautical miles (22.2 km; 13.8 mi)
- Exclusive economic zone: 123,881 km^{2} (47,831 mi^{2})

== See also ==
- List of ecoregions in Nicaragua
- List of islands of Nicaragua
- List of rivers of Nicaragua
- List of volcanoes in Nicaragua
- Protected areas of Nicaragua
- Territorial disputes of Nicaragua
- Water resources management in Nicaragua
