= Costa Rica–Nicaragua border =

International border

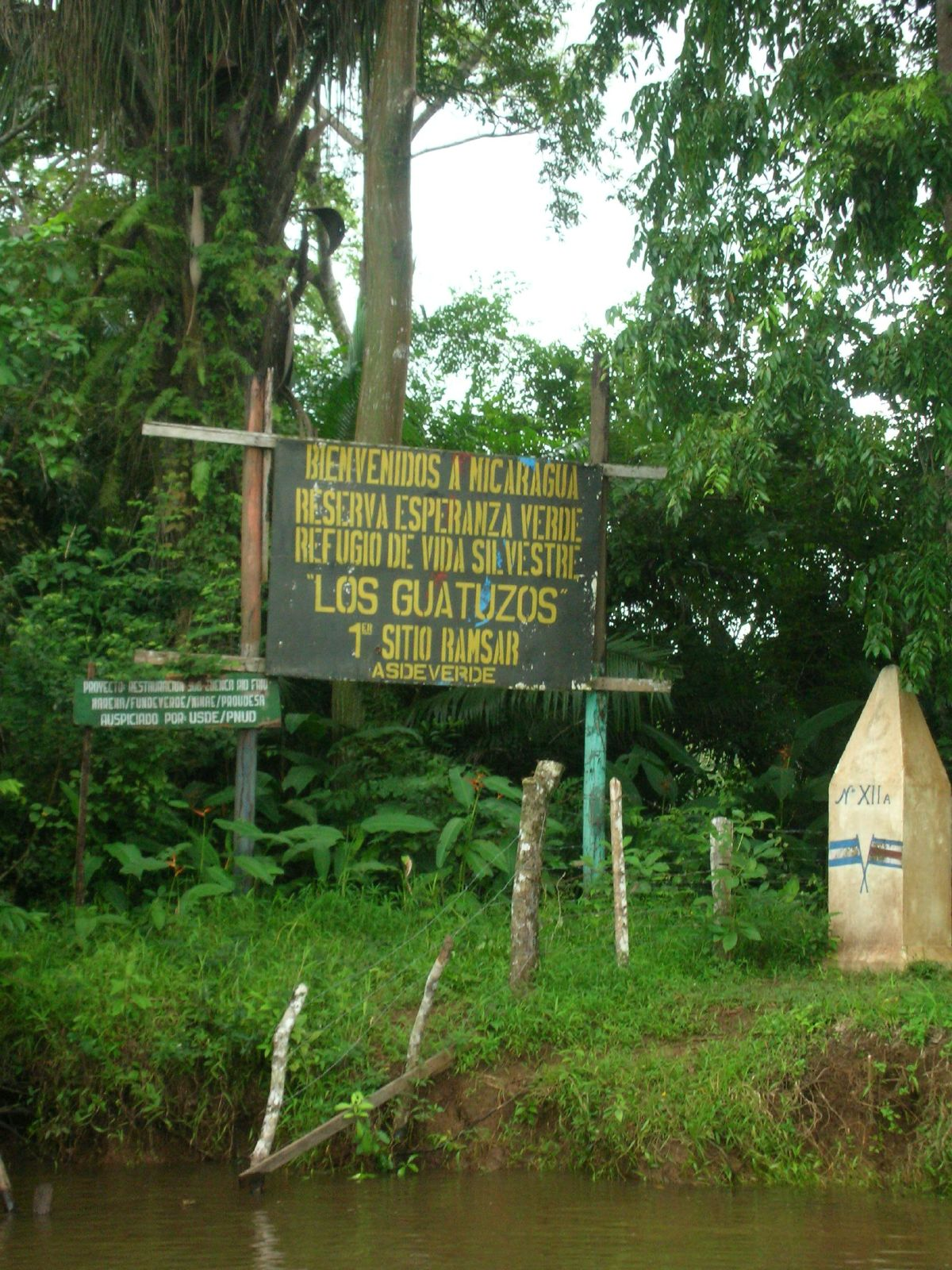
The border between the reserves of Caño Negro in Costa Rica and Los Guatuzos in Nicaragua.

The Costa Rica–Nicaragua border is a 309-kilometre (192 mi) long international border, extending east–west, between the Caribbean Sea in the east and the Pacific Ocean to the west, and it separates the northern part of Costa Rica from the southern part of Nicaragua. It passes near Lake Nicaragua. The southern bank of the River San Juan lies on the border for much of its length.

The border separates, from east to west:

- Departments of Nicaragua: Río San Juan and Rivas.
- Provinces of Costa Rica: Limón, Heredia, Alajuela and Guanacaste.

Costa Rica and Nicaragua were part of the United Provinces of Central America between 1823 and 1838. When this was dissolved both nations gained independence and the border was defined.

In 2010 Costa Rican Deputy Foreign Minister Carlos Roverssi complained that the map published by Google Maps did not correctly display the border between the two states. This provided a justification for entry of Nicaraguan military personnel into Costa Rica. The true border is based on the Cañas-Jerez Treaty of 1858 and the Cleveland Award of 1888. This is reflected in the map of the Nicaraguan Institute of Territorial Studies (INETER) which coincides with the National Geographic Institute of Costa Rica.

== See also ==
- Costa Rica–Nicaragua San Juan River border dispute
- Costa Rica–Nicaragua relations
- Calero Island
