= Costa Rica–Nicaragua San Juan River border dispute =

Border dispute in Central America

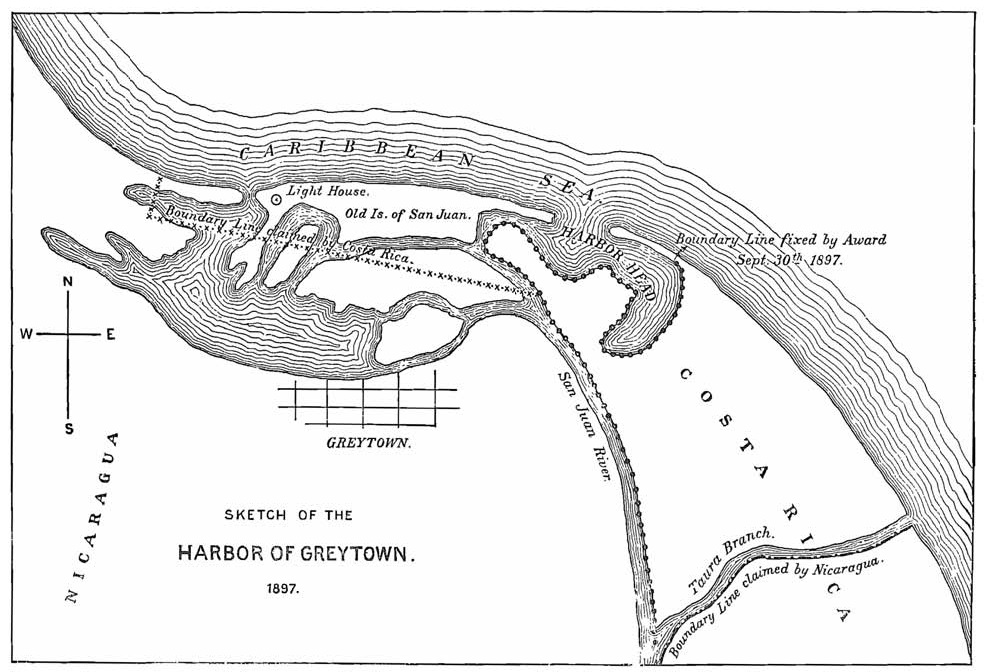
Sketch of the Greytown (San Juan del Norte) harbor area, contained in the first arbitral award given by Gen. Edward Porter Alexander on 30 September 1897, indicating the boundary line between Nicaragua and Costa Rica as determined by that award.

The Nicaragua–Costa Rica San Juan River border dispute was a series of periodical conflicts between Costa Rica and Nicaragua over the correct delimitation of their common border at its east-end, and the interpretation of the navigation rights on the San Juan River established in the Cañas-Jerez Treaty of 1858.

The most recent disputes include an interpretation about the scope and limits of Costa Rica's rights for free navigation and Nicaragua's sovereign control over the San Juan River, which was resolved by the International Court of Justice in 2009; and the ongoing dispute that began in October 2010 regarding the dredging of San Juan River, in the area of Isla Calero. This last dispute was referred in the media as the Google Maps War.

== History ==
According to the Cañas-Jerez Treaty of 1858, reaffirmed in arbitration by President Grover Cleveland of the United States in 1888 and interpreted by the Central American Court of Justice in 1916 (case Costa Rica v. Nicaragua), Nicaragua is sovereign over the Río San Juan, and Costa Rica has the right to navigate over part of the river with articles for trade which in case of need, as determined by Nicaragua can be accompanied by revenue cutters. The treaty also states that no taxes would be imposed on Costa Rican trade in goods except those accepted by mutual agreement.

Historically, the possibility that the Río San Juan might become the route for a Nicaragua Canal has exacerbated the dispute. The construction of the Panama Canal as well as Nicaragua's dry ecocanal project have largely deflated this motive for friction.

== 2009 International Court of Justice case ==
A dispute emerged in 1998 when Nicaragua forbade the transit of Costa Rican policemen in the river, which Nicaragua claims to be a breach of sovereignty, and unilaterally imposed a US$25 tax for any Costa Rican tourists who enter the San Juan river, as persons are not objects of trade but subjects of trade and are, therefore, not covered by the treaty. This and other subjects were the subjects of a case in the International Court of Justice.

On 13 July 2009, the International Court of Justice published the following ruling:

1. As regards Costa Rica's navigational rights on the San Juan river under the 1858 Treaty, in that part where navigation is common, the court finds: that Costa Rica has the right of free navigation on the San Juan river for purposes of commerce including the transport of passengers and the transport of tourists. People travelling on the San Juan river on board Costa Rican vessels exercising Costa Rica's right of free navigation are not required to obtain Nicaraguan visas or to purchase tourist cards. That the inhabitants of the Costa Rican bank of the San Juan river have the right to navigate on the river between the riparian communities for the purposes of the essential needs of everyday life which require expeditious transportation. That Costa Rica has the right of navigation on the San Juan River with official vessels used solely, in specific situations, to provide essential services for the inhabitants of the riparian areas where expeditious transportation is a condition for meeting the inhabitants' requirements. That Costa Rica does not have the right of navigation on the San Juan river with vessels carrying out police functions. That Costa Rica does not have the right of navigation on the San Juan river for the purposes of the exchange of personnel of the police border posts along the right bank of the river and of the re-supply of these posts, with official equipment, including service arms and ammunition.
2. As regards Nicaragua's right to regulate navigation on the San Juan river, in that part where navigation is common, the court finds that Nicaragua has the right to require Costa Rican vessels and their passengers to stop at the first and last Nicaraguan post on their route along the San Juan River; That Nicaragua has the right to require persons travelling on the San Juan river to carry a passport or an identity document; that Nicaragua has the right to issue departure clearance certificates to Costa Rican vessels exercising Costa Rica's right of free navigation but does not have the right to request the payment of a charge for the issuance of such certificates; that Nicaragua has the right to impose timetables for navigation on vessels navigating on the San Juan River; that Nicaragua has the right to require Costa Rican vessels fitted with masts or turrets to display the Nicaraguan flag;
3. As regards subsistence fishing, the court Finds that fishing by the inhabitants of the Costa Rican bank of the San Juan river for subsistence purposes from that bank is to be respected by Nicaragua as a customary right;
4. As regards Nicaragua's compliance with its international obligations under the 1858 Treaty, the court finds that Nicaragua is not acting in accordance with its obligations under the 1858 Treaty when it requires persons travelling on the San Juan River on board Costa Rican vessels exercising Costa Rica's right of free navigation to obtain Nicaraguan visas; when it requires persons travelling on the San Juan River on board Costa Rican vessels exercising Costa Rica's right of free navigation to purchase Nicaraguan tourist cards; and when it requires the operators of vessels exercising Costa Rica's right of free navigation to pay charges for departure clearance certificates.

== 2010 Isla Calero dispute ==
The boundary between Costa Rica and Nicaragua as claimed by the Nicaraguan and Costa Rican governments, autumn 2010. Note: the area shown as "Calero Island" is not that island.

On 8 October 2010, the Nicaraguan government initiated operations to dredge 33 kilometres (21 mi) of the San Juan River, led by commander Edén Pastora. On 20 October, the Costa Rican government complained to Nicaraguan authorities regarding an alleged violation of its sovereignty, as Nicaraguan troops had entered Costa Rican territory. Costa Rica's government said that the dredging of the river caused environmental damage in the wetlands at Isla Calero, which is part of the island nature reserve, in an area that is owned by the Costa Rican Ministry of the Environment. Nicaragua rejected all claims and replied that, in fact, Costa Ricans had been invading its territory, and the Vice President of Nicaragua commented that "We cannot invade our own territory". The Costa Rican government responded by sending 70 police reinforcements to the border area on 22 October. Nicaragua stationed around 50 soldiers on the island.

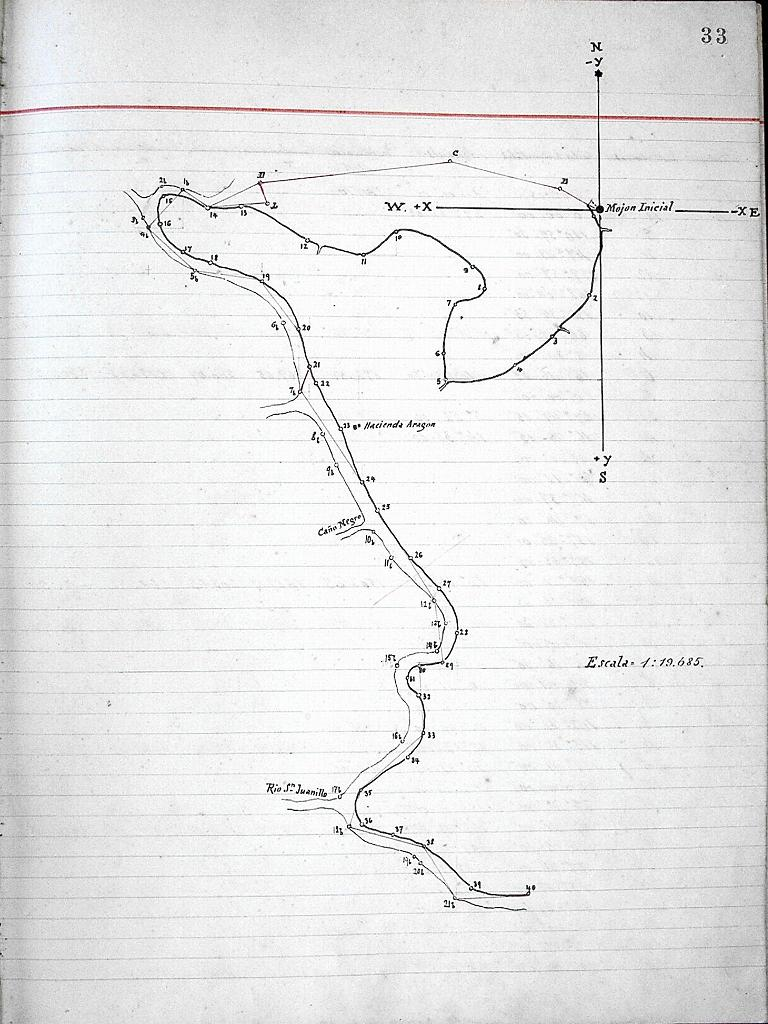
Map, dated 2 March 1898, from the official proceedings of the binational commission presided by engineer arbitrator Gen. Edward Porter Alexander, to define the frontier between the Republics of Nicaragua and Costa Rica.

According to a Costa Rican newspaper, Edén Pastora justified his actions based on the border as shown by Google Maps and the need to combat drug trafficking. However, Pastora denied making any claims about relying on Google Maps to determine the border, and said to the Nicaraguan press that his understanding of the border was based on the original text of the 1858 Cañas-Jerez Treaty. A representative for Google Latin America stated that while "Google maps are of very high quality and Google works constantly to improve and update existing information, by no means should they be used as a reference to decide military actions between two countries." He added, "In this instance Google has determined that there was an inaccuracy in the shaping of the border between Costa Rica and Nicaragua and is working to update the information as quickly as possible." The border depiction was later corrected by Google on Google Earth and in Google Maps.

Both countries took different approaches on how to solve the issue. Nicaragua argued it was a border dispute that should be resolved by the International Court of Justice, while Costa Rica claimed it was a military incursion and that the Organization of American States (OAS) should resolve the issue.

OAS General Secretary José Miguel Insulza met with both governments and inspected the conflict area. He then called for both countries to remove all troops and security personnel from the disputed territory as a first step toward opening a dialogue to resolve the situation peacefully and demarcate the boundary to prevent further conflicts. Costa Rica agreed to these terms, but Nicaragua refused to remove its troops. On a meeting on 12 November, by a vote of 22 to 2, the OAS ambassadors approved a resolution requesting Costa Rica and Nicaragua to pull out their troops from a conflict zone along their common border and to hold talks to settle their dispute. Nicaragua's President Daniel Ortega discarded the possibility of withdrawing the troops and disregarded the OAS resolution because his government considered this organization not to have jurisdiction to resolve border disputes. In the same press conference, President Ortega announced his intention to file a claim with the International Court of Justice for permission to navigate the Costa Rican Colorado River.

On the political side, some commentators criticized Daniel Ortega for allegedly taking advantage of this matter to promote his re-election. Costa Rica's President Laura Chinchilla was criticized by former President Óscar Arias for her naïve handling of the situation.

On 18 November 2010, Costa Rica filed proceedings against Nicaragua in the International Court of Justice. The complaint alleged an incursion into, occupation of and use by Nicaragua's army of Costa Rican territory, breaches of Nicaragua's treaty obligations toward Costa Rica, and "ongoing and planned dredging and the construction of the canal (that) will seriously affect the flow of water to the Colorado River of Costa Rica, and will cause further damage to Costa Rican territory, including the wetlands and national wildlife protected areas located in the region". Costa Rica also filed a request for provisional measures, including the withdrawal of all Nicaraguan troops from the island, the cessation of the construction of a canal across Costa Rican territory, the immediate cessation of the dumping of sediment in Costa Rican territory and immediate cessation of the felling of trees, removal of vegetation and soil from Costa Rican territory, including its wetlands and forests. On the same day, OAS approved a Costa Rican request, by a vote of 22 to 1 (and 7 abstentions), to convene a Consultative Meeting of OAS Ministers of Foreign Affairs to analyze the situation between Costa Rica and Nicaragua in the border zone of the San Juan River. The meeting took place on 7 December 2010.

In March 2011, the International Court of Justice provisionally ruled that Costa Rica and Nicaragua both must refrain from sending or maintaining civilians, security forces or police in this disputed border area, but that Costa Rica was allowed to send civilian teams concerned with environmental matters. Dredging by Nicaragua within the San Juan River itself was allowed to continue since Nicaragua has sovereignty over the river proper.

Later a dispute emerged regarding a road Costa Rica constructed at the border with Nicaragua. Nicaragua claimed that wetlands and national parks were being damaged. Nevertheless, Costa Rica argued it was necessary for protection from the "Sandinistas" and for providing electricity and other needs to people who live in a remote location, for whom the only previous transit method was by boat in the San Juan River.

A note of clarification: the conflict is not taking place on Isla Calero, with 151.6 km^{2}, but on Isla Portillos (located to the north of Calero) which is the eighth largest island in Costa Rica (16.8 km^{2}), including the Refugio Nacional de Vida Silvestre Corredor Fronterizo Norte, according to executive decree No. 23248-MIRENEN of 18 May 1994. Isla Portillos has been confused by Nicaraguans and Costa Ricans, including the press and governments of both countries, with the larger Isla Calero. In spite of this, the conflict has become known as the "Calero Island conflict".

== 2015 Resolution ==
On 16 December 2015, The International Court of Justice published its ruling. The court found that:

- Costa Rica has sovereignty over the disputed territory. By excavating three caños and establishing a military presence on Costa Rican territory, Nicaragua violated the territorial sovereignty of Costa Rica. By excavating two caños in 2013 and establishing a military presence in the disputed territory, Nicaragua breached the provisional ruling issued by the Court on 8 March 2011. Furthermore, Nicaragua breached Costa Rica's rights of navigation on the San Juan River pursuant to the 1858 Treaty of Limits. Nicaragua has the obligation to compensate Costa Rica for material damages caused by Nicaragua's unlawful activities on Costa Rican territory. Said compensation will be agreed upon by the parties before 16 December 2016, or, failing agreement, shall be determined by the court.
- Costa Rica violated its obligation under general international law by failing to carry out an environmental impact assessment concerning the construction of Route 1856.

In June 2016, Costa Rica made an estimation of the damage to be paid of US$6,700,000. It accepted to make a second evaluation of the damages if Nicaragua requested it.

Just before the deadline, on 6 December 2016, the president of Nicaragua Daniel Ortega publicly stated that his country was willing to pay the fine. This led Costa Rica to extend the deadline for the amount agreement.

On 16 January 2017, still no agreement on the amount was reached. The Costa Rica government filled a new case to the International Court of Justice concerning new military presence on its territory and asked the court to fix a final amount and a deadline concerning the 2015 resolution's compensation.

On 2 February 2018, the International Court of Justice ruled that "The total amount of compensation awarded to Costa Rica is US$378,890.59 to be paid by Nicaragua by 2 April 2018. This amount includes the principal sum of US$358,740.55 and pre-judgment interest on the compensable costs and expenses in the amount of US$20,150.04".

Also on 2 February 2018, the ICJ rendered another decision in the border dispute between Nicaragua and Costa Rica regarding Isla Portillos. The court awarded the beach of Isla Portillos between the mouth of the San Juan river and Laguna Los Portillos to Costa Rica (as its intervening channel with Isla Portillos had mostly disappeared from natural forces). Nicaragua was left with just the Laguna Los Portillos and its short strip of beach. The ICJ concluded that the whole beach was Costa Rican except for the part directly between the lagoon and the Caribbean Sea - now a tiny enclave of Nicaraguan territory separated from the rest of the country.

== See also ==
- Costa Rica–Nicaragua relations
- Foreign relations of Costa Rica
- Foreign relations of Nicaragua
- List of territorial disputes
- Territorial dispute
- Territorial disputes of Nicaragua
