= Costa Rica–Nicaragua relations =

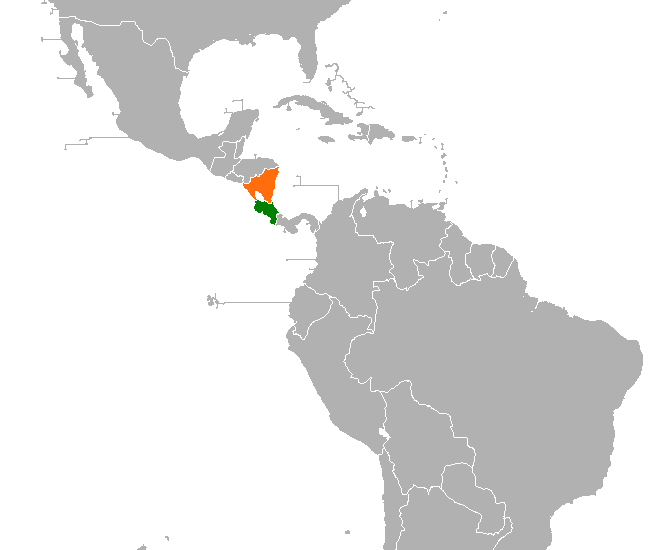

- Costa Rica: Nicaragua

Costa Rica–Nicaragua relations are the bilateral relations between Costa Rica and Nicaragua. Costa Rica has an embassy in Managua. Nicaragua has an embassy in San José. Both countries are members of the Central American Integration System, Community of Latin American and Caribbean States, and the Organization of Ibero-American States.

== See also ==
- Costa Rica–Nicaragua border
- Costa Rica–Nicaragua San Juan River border dispute
- Foreign relations of Costa Rica
- Foreign relations of Nicaragua
