= Cosigüina Peninsula =

Peninsula in Nicaragua

Península de Cosigüina
- Interactive map of Cosigüina Peninsula

Geography
- Location: El Viejo, Nicaragua
- Coordinates: 12°54′05″N 87°31′29″W

Cosigüina Peninsula is a peninsula located west of Nicaragua and is a protected area recognized as a natural reserve and wildlife refuge by the Ministry of the Environment and Natural Resources (MARENA). It is located in the northwest corner of the municipality of El Viejo, in the Chinandega Department. It was also called "Lacoalguina".

The territory occupied by the Cosigüina Peninsula was declared a refuge or asylum area for the protection of wild animals, through a decree published by the government of Nicaragua, on 2 September 1958.

== Description ==
The Cosigüina Peninsula has an area of 93,085 hectares, which is equivalent to 19.3% of the departmental surface. It limits to the north with the Gulf of Fonseca and the Estero Real, to the west and south with the Pacific Ocean and to the east with the volcanic plain of the Buena Vista valley. The islets of the Farallones de Cosiguina lie off the end of the peninsula in the Gulf of Fonseca.

On the peninsula is the Cosigüina Volcano Natural Reserve (RNVC), declared by decree published by the government of Nicaragua, on 19 September 1983. The buffer area of the Cosigüina Volcano Natural Reserve begins in the El Congo community, located 39 kilometers from the city of El Viejo, until ending in the Punta Ñata sector on the southwest side and in the Potosí sector on the northeast side of the Cosigüina volcano, which is itself the protected area of said Natural Reserve.
