= Farallones de Cosiguina =

Island group of Nicaragua

- Interactive map of Farallones de Cosiguina

Geography
- Location: Gulf of Fonseca
- Coordinates: 13°04′45″N 87°40′44″W

Administration
- Nicaragua

Demographics
- Population: Uninhabited

The Farallones de Cosiguina are a small group of rocky, cliffed islets lying some 10 km off the end of the Cosigüina Peninsula, in the Gulf of Fonseca, on the Pacific coast of Central America. The group is geologically of volcanic origin and belongs to Nicaragua. It is uninhabited, has a high point of 19 m elevation and is vegetated with coastal shrubland. It has been designated an Important Bird Area (IBA) by BirdLife International because it regularly supports a colony of bridled terns, with 600 breeding pairs recorded in 1994.

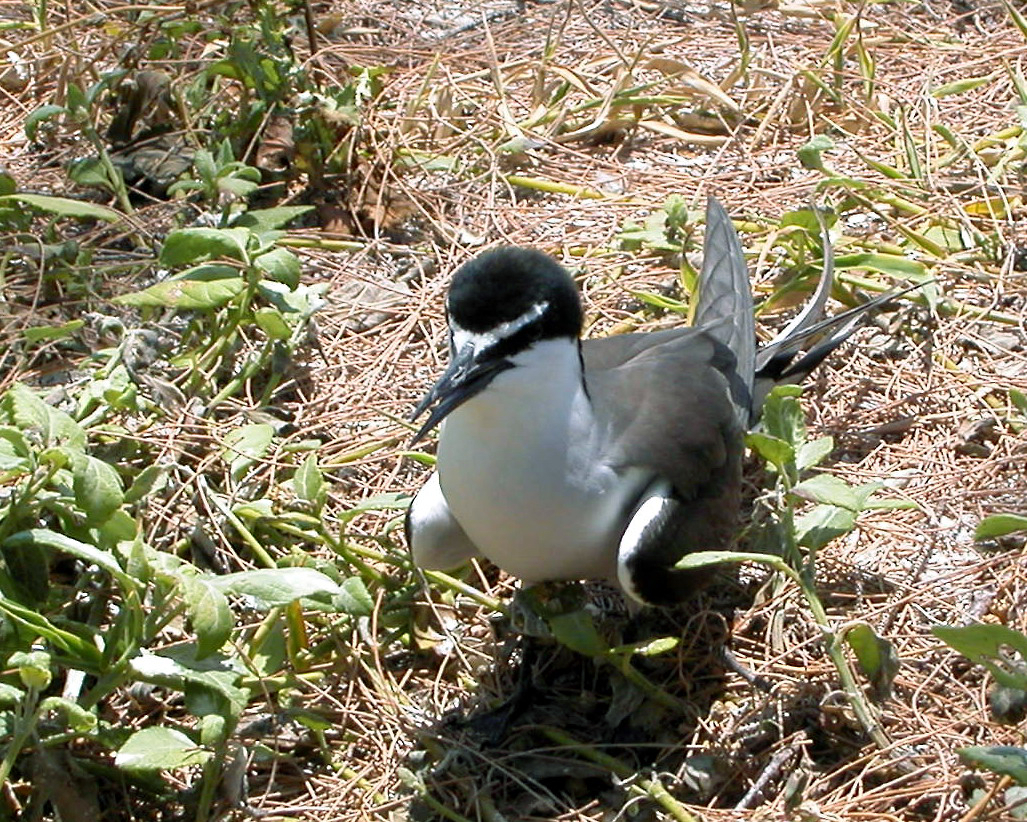
Bridled terns nest on the islets
