= Bismuna =

Nature reserve in Nicaragua

Coordinates: 14°44′49″N 83°24′30″W

Bismuna is a settlement and lagoon on the northeastern coast of Nicaragua, with the village of Bismuna Tara not far from the border with Honduras, on the Ibantara River. The lagoon, of some 130 square kilometres (50 sq mi), known as Laguna de Bismuna-Raya, is a protected reserve and is known for its biodiversity. The lagoon is surrounded by mangroves and white-sand beaches and the area is inhabited by the Miskito people.

== History ==
Bismuna was subject to human rights concerns in January 1982 when the local people were forced to move from the border area by the military. The Miskito Indians formed an armed resistance against the Sandinista outposts. In 1983, the Latinamerica Press described Bismuna as being a settlement of about 200 people, inhabited by Miskito farmers, before the displacement

== Geography ==
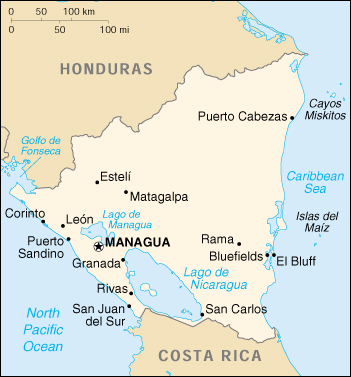
The Bismuna-Raya lagoon can be seen in the northeast of Nicaragua on the national map

Bismuna Tara village lies on the Ibantara River, not far from the border with Honduras, near the coast of the northeastern Nicaragua. The settlement contains a meteorological station, Estación Meteorológica Bismuna.

The lagoon of some 130 square kilometres (50 sq mi), known as Laguna de Bismuna-Raya, is a protected reserve. The lagoon is surrounded in mangroves and white-sand beaches and linked to the Caribbean Sea via the narrow Tukrun Channel. The Coco River has several tributaries running through the area, and with the smaller lagoons the area is known for its biodiversity.

== Demographics and economy ==
The area is inhabited by the Miskito people who fish on the Bismuna lagoon in dugout canoes. Boat excursions to the village of Bismuna are offered from Puerto Cabezas up the coast.
