= Ecocanal =

The Nicaraguan Ecocanal was a proposed project in Nicaragua to build a shallow-draft waterway connecting the inland Lake Nicaragua with the Caribbean Sea via the San Juan River in the south of the country. The main aim of the waterway was to provide a maritime alternative to the lengthy overland journeys that are presently required to import and export containerised cargoes through the ports of Puerto Cortes in Honduras and Puerto Limon in Costa Rica.

== Overview ==
Construction of the waterway would have allowed the passage of ocean-going barges that could be loaded at a new lake port to be built in the Lake of Nicaragua and discharged at upriver ports, like how the United States takes advantage of its extensive inland waterway system. An exploration concession Ley 319 for the project was unanimously approved by Nicaragua's National Assembly in 1999.

If completed, the canal would have eliminated transshipment costs at import and export ports, as well as the long road journeys to reach these ports, thereby offering significant cost savings in the overall freight charge. Barges could have been loaded directly close to the point of manufacture, and discharged within a couple of hundred kilometers of the final point of delivery. Transport cost savings were estimated at more than US$1,000 per FEU (forty-foot equivalent container).

The San Juan river is 200 kilometers (120 mi) long. The total waterway length from a lakeport in the vicinity of Granada/Tipitapa on the northern shore of the Lake of Nicaragua, to the outlet of the San Juan river at San Juan del Norte, is some 360 kilometers (220 mi). The principal obstacles to navigation are six sets of rapids along the river, and sand bars in shallower parts of the river. Average channel depth in the river during the dry season is around six feet (1.83m), with variations from around one foot (0.30m) to over 30 feet (9.14m). The average width of the river is some 200 metres.

To make the waterway navigable requires the construction of three locks to bypass the rapids and the dredging of the largest sandbars in the river. No dam construction is contemplated as the 8,000 square kilometers (3,100 sq mi) lake of Nicaragua provides a sufficient reserve of water to maintain navigation depth and to operate the locks throughout the different seasons of the year, once the locks and dredging are complete.

The 2.44 meters (8 ft 0 in) minimum depth after dredging, will allow the passage of shallow-draft barges, with cargo loads of up to 1,500 tons or 75 FEU at full draft of approximately 2 metres. The barges will be pushed by a towboat along the San Juan river and will be of an ocean-going design, with a protected and reinforced prow and ballasting capability for stability for crossing the open waters of the Caribbean. Such a design will allow the barges to be towed on the Lake of Nicaragua, and across the Caribbean Sea to different key points such as Panama, Jamaica, New Orleans or Key West, the latter two being entry points to the US inland waterway system.

The 2.44 meters (8 ft 0 in) navigation depth has been determined to be the most appropriate solution after modelling trade-offs between construction costs, capacity utilisation and scale economies.

In 2013 the Nicaraguan Government announced abandonment of the San Juan River route, in favour of an inter-oceanic canal, which will fully compete with the Panama Canal and which is to be funded by the Chinese HKND Group. This plan was abandoned by 2018.

== See also ==
- Nicaragua Canal
- Panama Canal
- Panama Canal expansion project
- Towboat
