= Isla Calero =

Island in Costa Rica

Disputed island
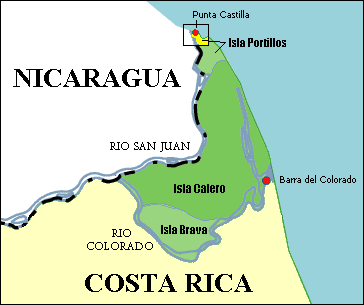
- Map of the islands Calero, Brava and Portillos. The box delimits the yellow zone corresponding to the disputed region between Costa Rica and Nicaragua during 2010-2011, which was resolved by the International Court of Justice.
- Interactive map of Isla Calero

Geography
- Location: San Juan River
- Coordinates: 10.8495°N 83.6231°W
- Area: 151.6 km^{2} (58.5 sq mi)

Demographics
- Population: 0

Isla Calero (English: Calero Island) is the largest island in Costa Rica, as well as along the San Juan River, which marks the border between Nicaragua and Costa Rica. The island lies between the San Juan (to the north and west), the Río Colorado of Costa Rica (to the south and southeast), and the Caribbean Sea (to the east and northeast). The entire island has an area of 151.6 km^{2} (58.5 sq mi).

Isla Calero lies within the undisputed territory of Costa Rica. In November 2010, Isla Portillos, an island adjacent to the northern tip of Isla Calero, an ecological preserve, became the focus of a dispute and extensive media coverage when Nicaraguan troops occupied it. At that time, a territorial dispute between the two Central American nations dating back to 1850 resurfaced over an area about 3 km in length on Isla Portillos, alternatively identified by the Nicaraguans as Harbour Head Island. Nicaragua had shown this part to be Costa Rican on all of its own maps for the previous half-century, as the border was defined by three historic documents: the Cañas–Jerez Treaty, the Cleveland Award, and the Alexander Award issued by E.P. Alexander, who acted as an arbitrator between the two countries in 1897. The 1858 Cañas–Jerez Treaty established Nicaraguan ownership of the San Juan River but gave Costa Rica the right to navigation for commercial purposes.

Nicaragua's claim beginning in 2010, which contradicted the map attached to the 1897 Alexander Award, was that a small intermittent channel about 3 km south of the northern tip of the island marked the international boundary, not the main San Juan River channel. In November 2010 Nicaraguan military forces clearcut forest along this channel and deepened it. In December 2010, commander Edén Pastora defended the claim by citing Google Maps as a source that supported the Nicaraguan position. Google quickly responded by correcting the error.

In March 2011, the International Court of Justice provisionally ruled that Costa Rica and Nicaragua both must refrain from sending or maintaining civilians, security forces or police in the disputed border area, but that Costa Rica was allowed to send civilian teams concerned with environmental matters. Dredging by Nicaragua within the San Juan River itself was allowed to continue, as Nicaragua has sovereignty over the river proper.

On December 16, 2015, the International Court of Justice decided that the territory in dispute belonged to Costa Rica.

== See also ==
- 2010 Isla Calero dispute
- List of islands of Costa Rica
