= Miskito Cays =

Coordinates: 14°23′N 82°46′W

Designations

Ramsar Wetland
- Official name: Cayos Miskitos y Franja Costera Immediata
- Designated: 8 November 2001
- Reference no.: 1135

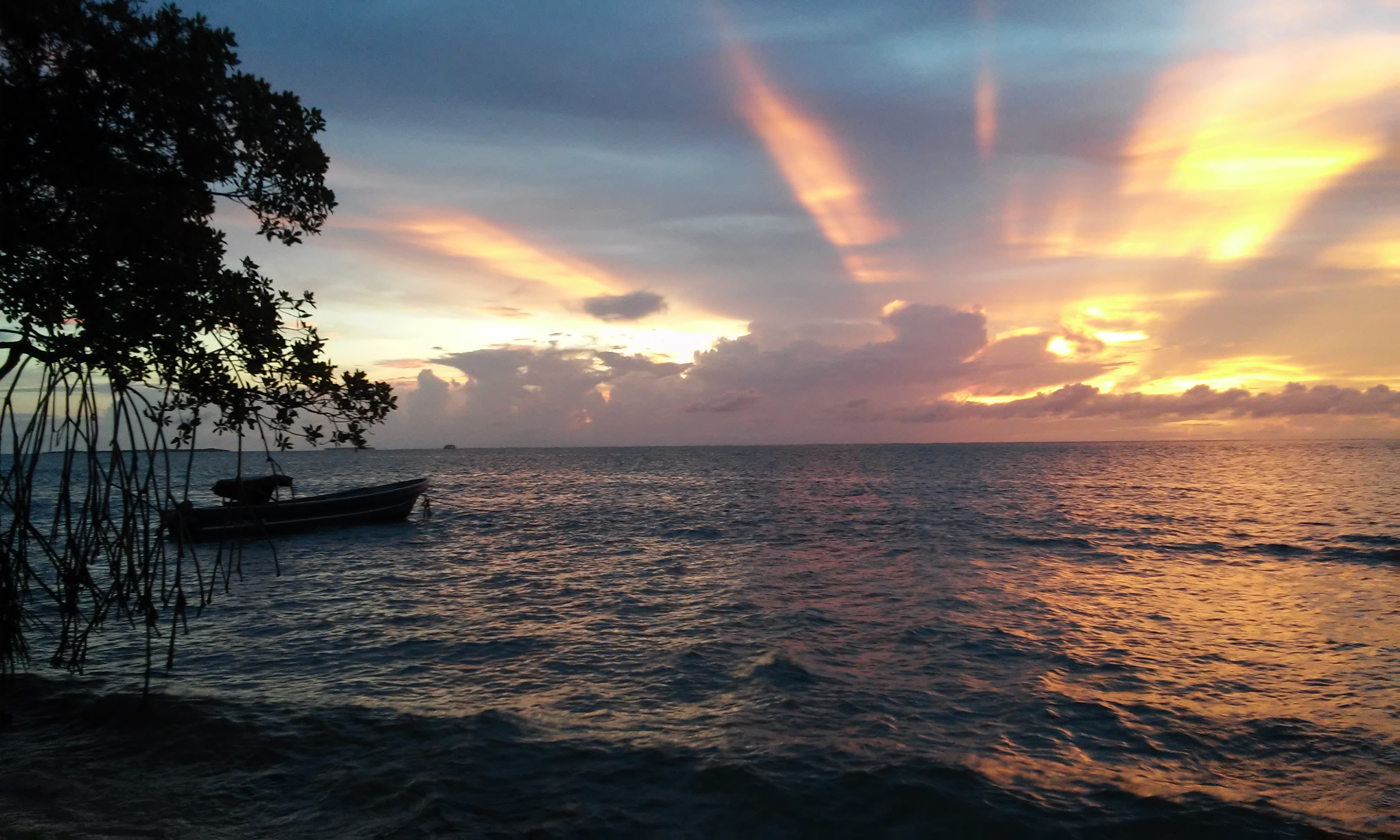
Sunset from the perspective of the Miskitos Cays in the Nicaraguan Caribbean Sea.

The Miskito Cays (Spanish: Cayos Miskitos) are an archipelago of small cays and reefs with an area of 27 km^{2} located off Mosquito Coast in the Caribbean exclusive economic zones of Honduras and Nicaragua. They are part of the Gracias a Dios Department in Honduras and the North Caribbean Coast Autonomous Region in Nicaragua. The Miskito Cays are composed of 76 formations that include estuaries, coral reefs, cays, seagrass beds, and islets, of which 12 of the formations are covered with vegetation and consequently form islands which are lined with white sand beaches.

In Nicaragua, the Miskito Cay (Cayo Miskito), also known as Cayo Mayor, is the largest and most important cay located in the center of the archipelago measuring 37 km^{2}. Other main islands are Maras Cay, Nasa Cay, and Morrison Denis Cay. The Miskito Cays Biological Reserve is one of 78 protected areas of Nicaragua, it was declared a protected area in 1991. The cays, along with a stretch of the adjacent mainland coast, have been designated an Important Bird Area (IBA) by BirdLife International.
