= Cañas–Jerez Treaty =

1858 treaty between Costa Rica and Nicaragua

The Cañas–Jerez Treaty between Costa Rica and Nicaragua was enacted April 15, 1858 as a solution to the growing border tension between the two countries. The treaty was negotiated between Máximo Jerez representing Nicaragua and José María Cañas representing Costa Rica. It established a border between the two countries that skirts the southern edge of Lake Nicaragua, then moves east along the San Juan River for the last third of the division, following it north from where it forks from the Rio Colorado. The treaty puts the border on the right bank of the river, giving the river to Nicaragua, but provides commercial navigation rights to Costa Rica.

== The Negotiations ==
After the annexation of the Nicoya jurisdiction in 1824 by Costa Rica, Nicaragua reclaimed this territory on repeated occasions. Although Nicaragua claimed the land, arguments over the land still continued. In an attempt to mend these disputes over ownership many subsequent treaties were drawn up, including the treaty of Oreamuno-Buitrago (1838), Madriz-Zavala (1846), Molina-Juárez (1848), Molina-Marcoleta (1854), Cañas-Juárez (1857), Cañas-Martínez treaty (1857) and the Webster-Crampton (1852) treaty. Despite all these actions, none of the treaties were agreed upon by both parties. Eventually a Webster-Crampton treaty was approved. In April 1858, Nicaragua sent Máximo Jerez Tellería, the Minister of Plenipotentiary to San Jose to try to negotiate a new agreement. Costa Rica subsequently appointed General José María Cañas Escamilla to negotiate with Telería. The negotiations took place in the presence of Féliz Belly, a French journalist who was interested in a contract to build a new canal. On April 15 the new treaty was approved narrowly by the Costa Rican Congress and was also approved by the Constituent Assembly of Nicaragua. Juan Rafael, the Costa Rican president traveled to the Nicaraguan city of Rivas where the treaty was exchanged with the Nicaraguan president, Tomás Martínez Guerrero.

In the 1870s, Nicaragua began to object the validity of the treaty. In an attempt to resolve the differences, the following negotiations were held and signed in addition the previous treaty, Herrera-Zavala (1872), Víquez-Step (1886), and Zambrana-Alvarez (1883). The Castro-Navas (1884) talks were not settled. During 1886, more tensions rose between Costa Rica and Nicaragua but to the assistance of Guatalama, an arbitrary agreement was signed by the Licensed Ascension Esquivel Ibarra, of Costa Rica and Mr. José Antonio Román of Nicaragua. At the Esquivel- Román meeting, it was agreed that the validity of the Cañas-Jerez treaty was possibly invalid by the United States President. On March 22, 1888, president Grover Cleveland recognized the validity of the Cañas-Jerez treaty. Cleveland clarified many points of unclear interpretation within the treaty.

== See also ==
- Costa Rica–Nicaragua San Juan River border dispute
