= 1860 Costa Rican general election =

- 8 April 1860 (electoral college)
- Presidential election

435 members of the Electoral College 218 votes needed to win
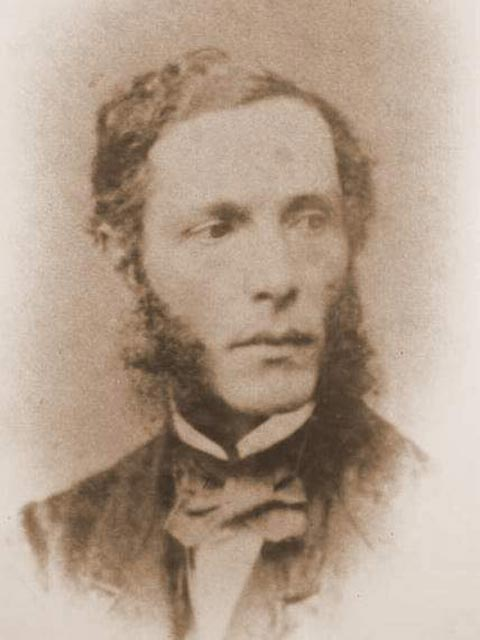

Nominee	José María Montealegre	Manuel Mora Fernández
Party	Independent	Independent
Alliance	Anti-morismo	Morismo
Electoral vote	365	52
Percentage	83.72%	11.93%
- Estimated results by province
President before election
José María Montealegre
Independent
Elected President
José María Montealegre
Independent

General elections were held in Costa Rica on 8 April 1860 to elect the president for a three-year term. These were the first elections conducted under the 1859 Constitution. Incumbent president José María Montealegre, who had assumed power following the removal of President Juan Rafael Mora, ran for a full term.

President Mora had been deposed on 14 August 1859, three months after beginning his third term in office. One of the leaders of the coup, Montealegre, subsequently assumed the presidency. Shortly thereafter, he called for general elections and convened a Constituent Assembly, which drafted and adopted the Constitution under which the election was held.

Although formal political parties did not yet exist, political competition was structured around two broad factions: the moristas, supporters of Mora, and the anti-moristas, opponents of Mora who were then in government. The moristas postulated Manuel Mora Fernández, relative of Juan Rafael, without success.

== Background ==
Following the forced resignation of President José María Castro Madriz (1847–1853) on 15 November 1849, amid an insurrection led by José Manuel Quirós y Blanco, commander of the San José barracks, and the imminent threat of a military coup, Castro Madriz had relinquished power. On 26 November, Congress appointed former vice president Juan Rafael Mora Porras to reassume the vice presidency and, thus, the presidency on an interim basis, pending early presidential elections to complete Castro Madriz’s term. In the election, Mora secured the presidency with 54.4% of the vote.

Mora subsequently led an administration that initially enjoyed strong support from the expanding coffee-growing bourgeoisie and the commercial sector, from which he himself originated. His first term (1849–1853) was marked by relative political stability and economic growth driven by coffee exports, as well as efforts to strengthen state institutions and centralize power in San José at the expense of municipalities.

The Filibuster War of 1856–1857, known in Costa Rica as the Campaña Nacional ("National Campaign"), generated a surge of national unity and significantly bolstered Mora’s popularity. In recognition of his leadership during the conflict, Congress granted him the honorary rank of Captain General. However, the war coincided with a severe cholera epidemic in 1856, which proved to be a major demographic catastrophe, claiming the lives of an estimated 8–10% of the population—more than 9,600 deaths out of approximately 112,000 inhabitants—within a ten-week period. The epidemic, combined with the substantial public expenditures associated with the war, mounting public debt to private creditors, and wartime expropriations, generated growing dissatisfaction among segments of the bourgeoisie.

Despite these challenges, Mora secured re-election for a second consecutive six-year term with 92.5% of the vote. Nevertheless, political opposition began to consolidate, including former allies and members of his own administration, who increasingly criticized the concentration of power and the economic consequences of his policies. On 14 August of that year, Mora was overthrown in a coup led by Colonel Lorenzo Salazar Alvarado and Major Máximo Blanco Rodríguez, commanders of the San José barracks. In the following hours, his brother José Joaquín Mora Porras, General José María Cañas, Manuel Argüello Mora—Mora’s nephew and adviser—and other officials were also detained. The group was subsequently taken to Puntarenas and expelled from the country, departing aboard the steamship Guatemala for El Salvador.

Physician José María Montealegre Fernández, a member of the influential Montealegre family, assumed the presidency on a provisional basis and de facto suspended the 1847 Constitution.

== Electoral system ==
Title VI of the 1859 Constitution established a two-tier system of suffrage. In the first stage, male Costa Rican citizens were entitled to vote in popular assemblies, provided they met certain requirements: they had to be at least twenty years old (or eighteen if married or holding a professional or academic qualification), possess property, or engage in an honest occupation yielding sufficient income to support themselves in accordance with their social standing.

The second stage of the electoral process was reserved for electors chosen by these citizens, who exercised their role in electoral assemblies. Eligibility to serve as an elector required Costa Rican citizenship, a minimum age of 25, literacy, residence in the province corresponding to the appointing district, and ownership of property valued at no less than 500 pesos or an annual income of at least 200 pesos. As in the 1847 Constitution, the authority for opening electoral records, counting presidential votes, and formally declaring the election when an absolute majority was achieved was assigned to Congress. If no candidate obtained an absolute majority, the legislature was tasked with selecting the president from among the candidates who had received the highest number of votes.

== Campaign ==
The elections were called on 21 February 1860, with the second round held on 8 April. The incumbent president, José María Montealegre, then 44 years old, stood as the official candidate, seeking election to a constitutional term. Supporters of Juan Rafael Mora Porras attempted to organize an opposition candidacy and sought a well-known and financially secure figure, eventually backing Manuel José Mora Fernández, aged 59, a former president of the Supreme Court of Justice in 1842 and a younger brother of former head of state Juan Mora Fernández.

The contest was characterized by strong familial ties among the leading political figures. In addition to Montealegre, his brothers Francisco and Mariano also received votes in the election. Manuel José Mora Fernández, although a cousin of the Montealegre brothers, represented the opposing faction aligned with Mora Porras, known as moristas. Supporters of the opposition alleged that Montealegre’s backers destroyed ballots cast in favor of Mora Fernández, and only a limited number of such ballots were left intact in order to avoid "an implausibly blatant manipulation of the results".

== Results ==
Candidate	Party	Votes	%
José María Montealegre Fernández	Anti-morismo	365	83.72
Manuel Mora Fernández	Morismo	52	11.93
Francisco Montealegre Fernández	Anti-morismo	9	2.06
Mariano Montealegre Fernández	Anti-morismo	2	0.46
Vicente Aguilar Cubero	Anti-morismo	2	0.46
Juan José Ulloa Solares	Independent	2	0.46
Julián Volio Llorente	Anti-morismo	2	0.46
Manuel Alvarado y Barroeta	Independent	1	0.23
Jesús Jiménez Zamora	Anti-morismo	1	0.23
Total		436	100.00
Source: TSE

=== Second round results by province ===
Province	Montealegre	Mora	Others
San José Province	127	1	2
Alajuela	31	40	4
Cartago Province	105	0	0
Heredia	68	1	1
Guanacaste	20	9	12
Puntarenas	14	1	0
Total	365	52	19
Source: TSE
