= 1859 Costa Rican general election =

- 3–7 April 1859
- Presidential election
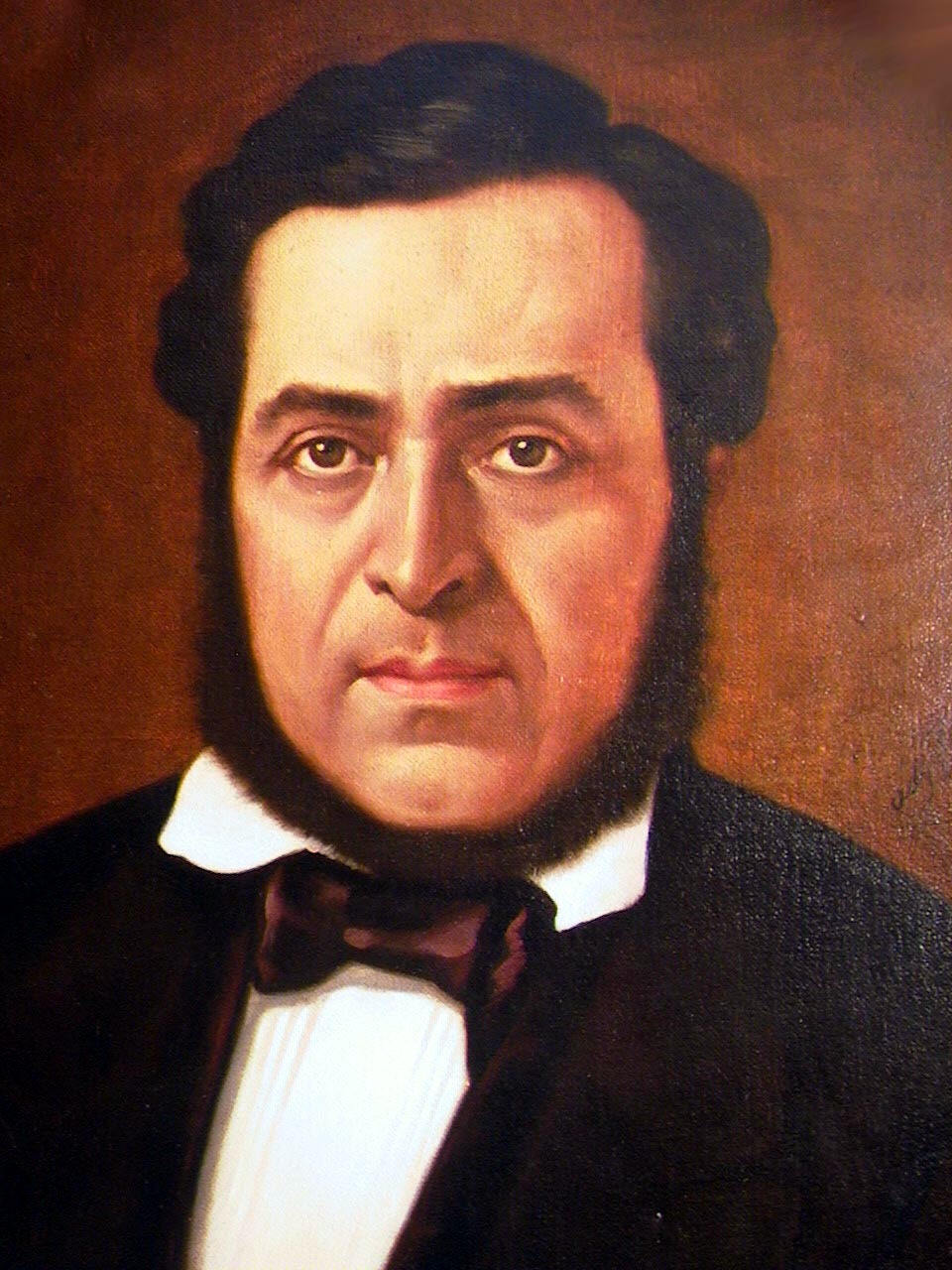

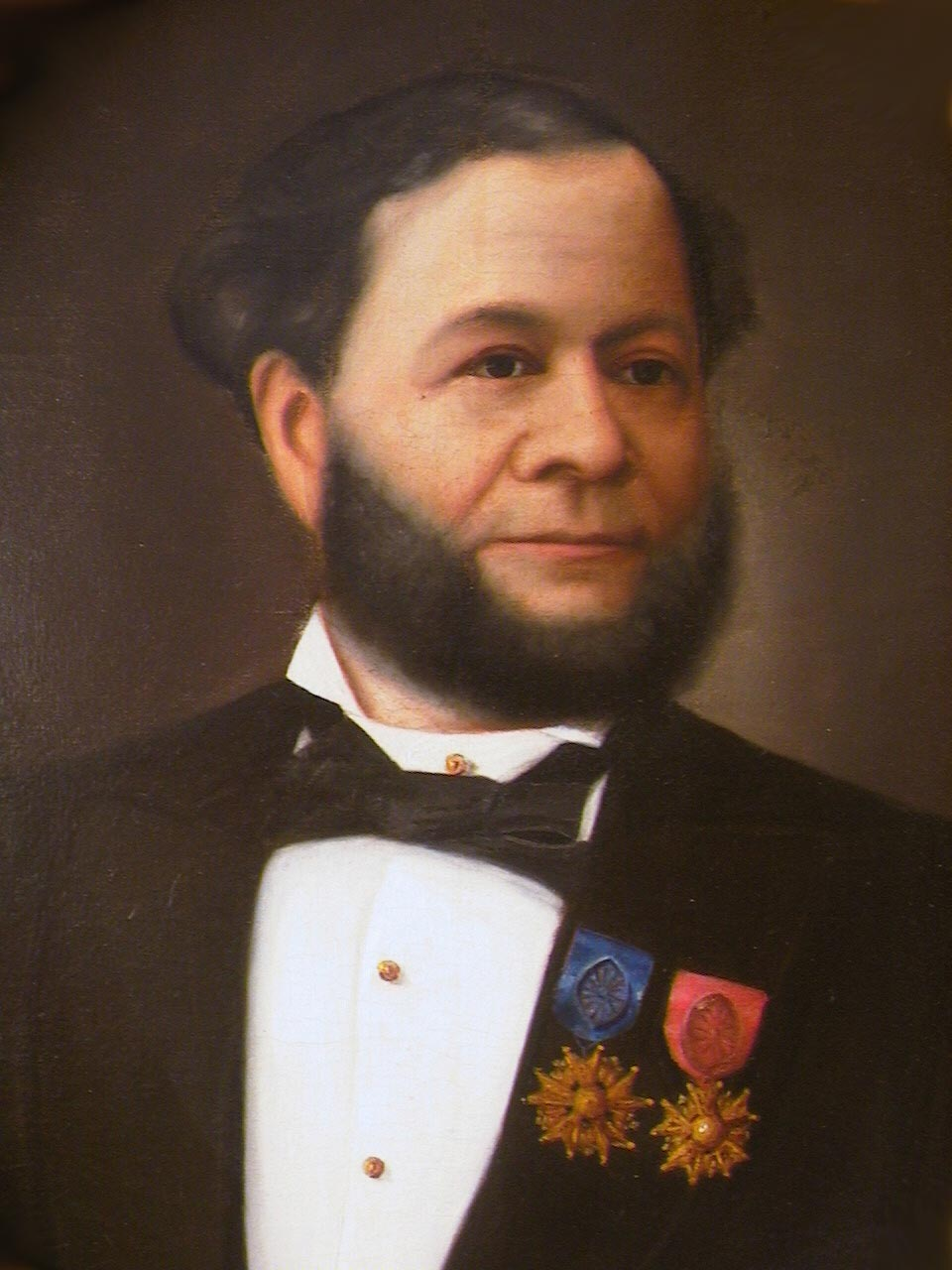
| Nominee | Juan Rafael Mora Porras | José María Castro Madriz |
| Electoral vote | 87 | 2 |
| Percentage | 92.55% | 2.13% |
President before election
Juan Rafael Mora Porras
Elected President
Juan Rafael Mora Porras

General elections were held in Costa Rica between 3 and 7 April 1859. Juan Rafael Mora Porras, hero of the Filibuster War, was re-elected for a third time. However, Mora would not finish his term because he would be overthrown by his political opponents on 14 August later the same year.

The 1859 constitution in force at that time only allowed men over 25 years old and owners of a property valued at least 200 pesos to cast the vote.

== Results ==
| Candidate | Votes | % |
|---|---|---|
| Juan Rafael Mora Porras | 87 | 92.55 |
| José María Castro Madriz | 2 | 2.13 |
| José María Cañas | 1 | 1.06 |
| Vicente Aguilar Cubero | 1 | 1.06 |
| José Joaquín Mora Porras | 1 | 1.06 |
| Juan José Ulloa Solares | 1 | 1.06 |
| Julián Volio Llorente | 1 | 1.06 |
| Total | 94 | 100.00 |
Source: TSE
