= 1860 in Costa Rica =

Events in the year 1860 in Costa Rica

== Incumbents ==
- President: José María Montealegre

== Deaths ==
- September 30 - Juan Rafael Mora Porras
- October 2 - José María Cañas
