= Máximo Blanco Rodríguez =

Costa Rican military personnel (1824-1886)

General Máximo Blanco
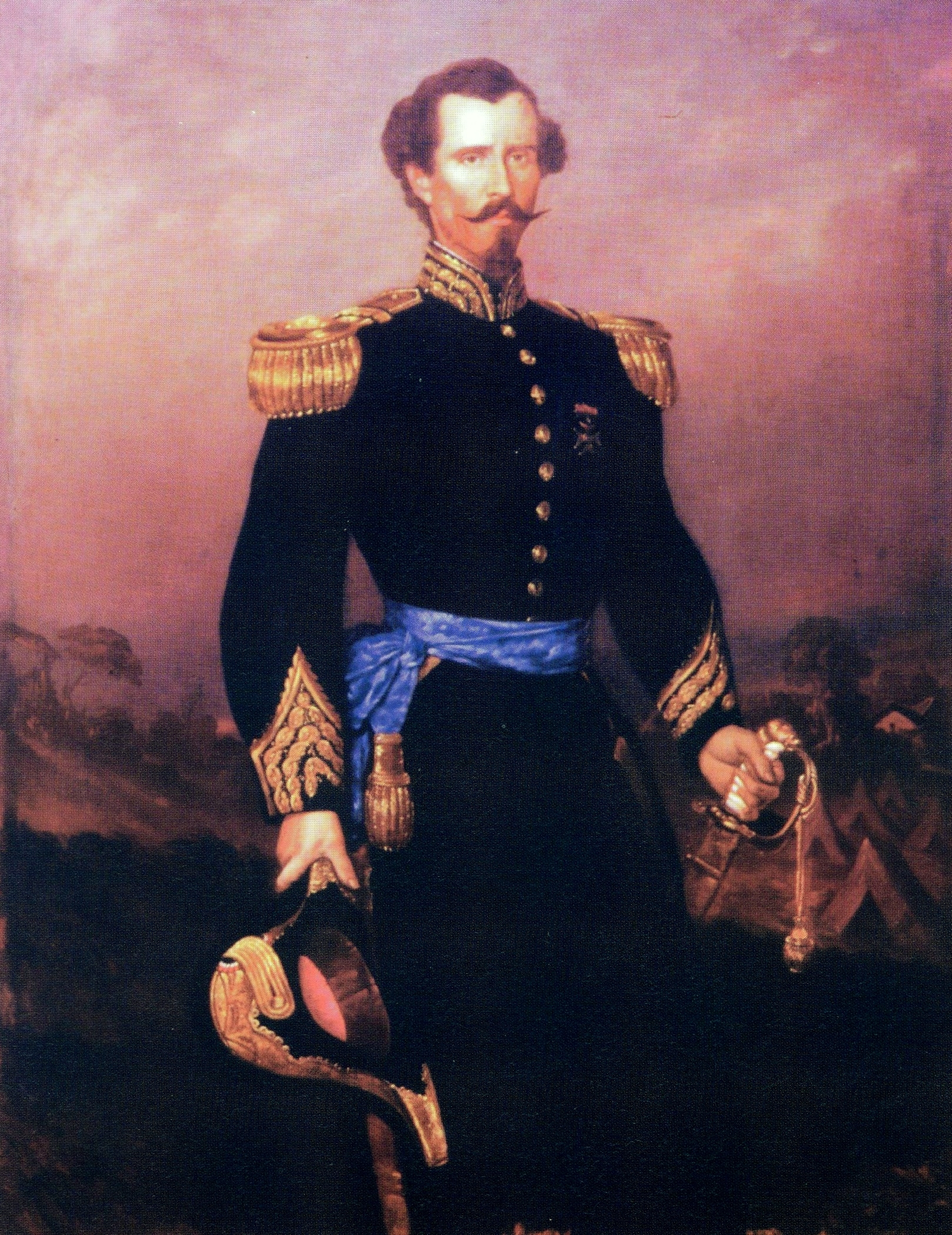

Personal details
- Born: Máximo de Jesús Blanco Rodríguez; January 8, 1824 San José, Federal Republic of Central America
- Died: July 26, 1886 (aged 62) San José, Costa Rica
- Cause of death: Natural causes
- Spouse: Brígida Mora Guillén
- Children: Ramona Filomena, Juan José Leonidas, Leona Zoila, Segunda María, Narciso, Amalia
- Awards: Cross of Honor
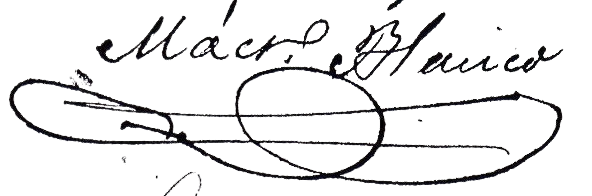
- Signature

Military service
- Allegiance: Costa Rica
- Branch/service: Costa Rican Army
- Years of service: 1846–1869
- Rank: Brigadier general
- Commands: Vanguard Division (1856-1857); Main Barracks of San José (1857–1869)
- Battles/wars: Filibuster War; Second Battle of Rivas; Battle of Hipp's Point (1856); Battle of Hipp's Point (1857); Battle of La Angostura (1860)

Máximo de Jesús Blanco Rodríguez (San José, January 8, 1824 – ibidem, July 26, 1886) was a Costa Rican military leader and general. He distinguished himself as one of the primary heroes of the Filibuster War gainst William Walker's filibusters, strategically leading the capture of the Transit Route.

== Biography ==
=== Early years and family ===
Máximo Blanco was born in the city of San José on January 8, 1824. His parents were Manuel Blanco Rojas and María de Jesús Rodríguez Chacón. He came from a family with deep military ties in the capital; he was a first cousin of the influential captain and military commander José Manuel Quirós Blanco. He shared his life with Brígida Mora Guillén, with whom he raised a large family.

=== Early military career ===
In a Costa Rica lacking a professional military tradition and with few garrison facilities, Blanco opted for a military career combined with agricultural work. His first intervention in national politics occurred on June 7, 1846, when he participated alongside then-Sub-Lieutenant Lorenzo Salazar in the barracks coup that overthrew interim Head of State José Rafael Gallegos to install José María Alfaro.

In April 1850, with the creation of the Artillery Barracks by President Juan Rafael Mora Porras, the power of the military based at the Main Barracks (where Blanco was stationed) was threatened. Recently promoted to the rank of sergeant major, Blanco joined a revolt in June 1850 led by his cousin José Manuel Quirós y Blanco against President Mora. The movement failed, and Blanco was briefly exiled from the country, though his banishment lasted only a short time.

=== Filibuster War ===
The war against the invading forces of William Walker marked the pinnacle of Blanco's military career. He stood out for his bravery, loyalty to his troops, and tactical brilliance.

On April 11, 1856, commanding 300 men and joining Colonel Salvador Mora, Blanco took an active part in the Battle of Rivas. The following day, the high command ordered him to move with 200 men to the port of San Juan del Sur. The objective was strategic: to seize control of this point to prevent the filibusters from receiving reinforcements and supplies from California. Blanco secured the position without firing a single shot, dominating the port until the cholera epidemic forced the army's retreat.

==== The Transit Campaign ====
His military consecration occurred during the second stage of the conflict, known as the Transit Campaign. President Mora entrusted him with the leadership of the Vanguard Division, a column of 200 men tasked with cutting Walker's logistical route along the San Juan River.

In December 1856, Blanco and his men together with the American engineer Silvanus Spencer trekked through jungles and navigated rivers under extreme weather conditions. On December 22, via a surprise bayonet assault, they captured the strategic point of Hipp's Point. In the following days, Blanco led daring boarding actions to capture the filibuster steamboats (J. Wheeler, Ch. Morgan, H.L. Bulwer, Machuca, J.N. Scott, J. Ogden, Virgen, and San Carlos), as well as Castillo Viejo and Fort San Carlos.

In mid-February 1857, he had to defend the post of La Trinidad against a large filibuster counterattack coming from San Juan del Norte. Despite a lack of supplies and precarious conditions, he resisted for several days, engaging the filibusters in intermittent combat. Due to the shortage of provisions, he made a strategic retreat from the post on February 13, 1857. The filibusters took the point the next day but were unable to bypass Castillo Viejo, where they were repulsed.

=== Coups d'état (1859–1868) ===
After the war concluded, the military returned with immense prestige. An alliance was subsequently forged between the barrack leaders and the rising coffee oligarchy. On August 14, 1859, Blanco supported General Lorenzo Salazar in the coup d'état that overthrew President Juan Rafael Mora Porras. Ten days later, the new government of José María Montealegre Fernández promoted him to the rank of Brigadier General and confirmed him as commander of the Main Barracks of San José. In September 1860, former president Mora Porras returned to the country and initiated an armed uprising in Puntarenas. General Blanco was dispatched to quell the rebellion. After a violent engagement on the night of September 28, known as the Battle of La Angostura, Blanco defeated the morist forces.

Despite his victory, Blanco faced the moral dilemma of executing the orders of the government to put to death former president Mora Porras, General José María Cañas, and Ignacio Arancibia. Although he fundamentally disapproved of the sentences, he complied with the official directives out of military discipline, an event that would mark the rest of his life with a social stigma. However, Blanco imposed his authority on the field to save Manuel Argüello Mora, nephew of don Juanito, from the firing squad. Between 1863 and 1869, Blanco and Salazar became the arbiters of national politics. They determined who occupied the presidency based on the interests of the elite. On November 1, 1868, both generals executed a new coup d'état that overthrew President José María Castro Madriz, placing Jesús Jiménez Zamora back in power.

=== Forced retirement and death ===
President Jiménez Zamora, determined to end the de facto power of the military and promote civilian rule, tasked his Minister of War, Eusebio Figueroa Oreamuno, with dismantling the praetorian system. In April 1869, having pressured Salazar's exit months earlier, Figueroa forced General Máximo Blanco to sign his definitive resignation from active military service.

Stripped of his command, Blanco retired to private and agricultural life. He died of natural causes (consumption) at his residence in San José on July 26, 1886.

== Bibliography ==
- Fernández Guardia, Ricardo (2005). Cartilla Histórica de Costa Rica. EUNED. 163 pages. ISBN 9968-31-375-0
- Fernández Guardia, Ricardo (2008). Espigando en el pasado: El diario del Mayor don Máximo Blanco. EUNED. p. 91-95. ISBN 9968-31-369-6
- Revista de los Archivos Nacionales de San José, Costa Rica, May and June 1930.
- Montero Barrantes, Francisco (1990). Elementos de Historia de Costa Rica. Tomo II, Volumen 2. EUNED. ISBN 9968-31-283-5
- Obando Cairol, Emilio Gerardo (2011). Los generales Blanco y Salazar. Entre el heroísmo y el estigma: un estudio histórico-genealógico (2nd edition). San José: Asociación de Genealogía e Historia de Costa Rica.
