= Battle of Santa Rosa =

1856 Filibuster War battle in Nicaragua

Coordinates: 10.8348°N 85.6124°W

- Part of the Filibuster War
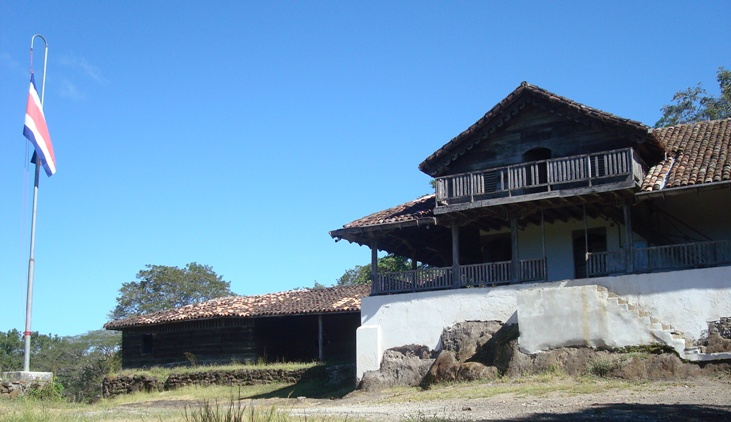
- Santa Rosa Hacienda
Date	20 March 1856
Location	Hacienda Santa Rosa (La Cruz Canton), Guanacaste Province, Costa Rica
Result	Costa Rican victory

Belligerents
Filibusters	Costa Rica

Commanders and leaders
Louis Schlessinger	José Joaquín Mora Porras

Strength
270–400	600–1,000

Casualties and losses
26 killed, 19 prisoners, several wounded	19 killed, 32 wounded

In the 19th century, Nicaragua was beset by political issues among liberals and conservatives, allowing William Walker, an American Southerner seeking to establish English-speaking slavery states in Latin America, to ascend to the Nicaraguan presidency.

Walker believed in the doctrine of manifest destiny, and established himself in Nicaragua in the guise of offering help to liberals, but his real intentions were to conquer the five provinces of Central America, a manifesto he titled "Five or None." This territory claimed by Nicaragua was part of Costa Rica, creating a territorial issue that, together with the fear of an all-out invasion of the region, led to the Filibuster War or Campaña Nacional between both countries from 1855 to 1857.

In Costa Rica, Juan Rafael Mora Porras, the president, was urged and backed by the British, saw the danger of Walker's intentions and on 27 February 1856 declared war on Nicaragua and called on all Costa Ricans to join forces and fight, a call that was heeded.

A Costa Rican vanguard of 2,500 began marching on 4 March from San José to the northern border, led by the president Juan Rafael Mora Porras, arriving in Liberia on 12 March, where they joined the battalion organised there (the Moracia Battalion), under the leadership of José María Cañas.

When the filibusters of the Nicaraguan movement realised what was happening in Costa Rica, they organised a battalion numbering about 70 men, two out of its four companies consisting entirely of Frenchmen, the other two companies entirely of Germans, under the leadership of Colonel Schlessinger, which entered Costa Rica through the road that joined Nicaragua with Liberia and which passed by the Hacienda Santa Rosa, where they arrived exhausted by the long and weary march late at night on 20 March.

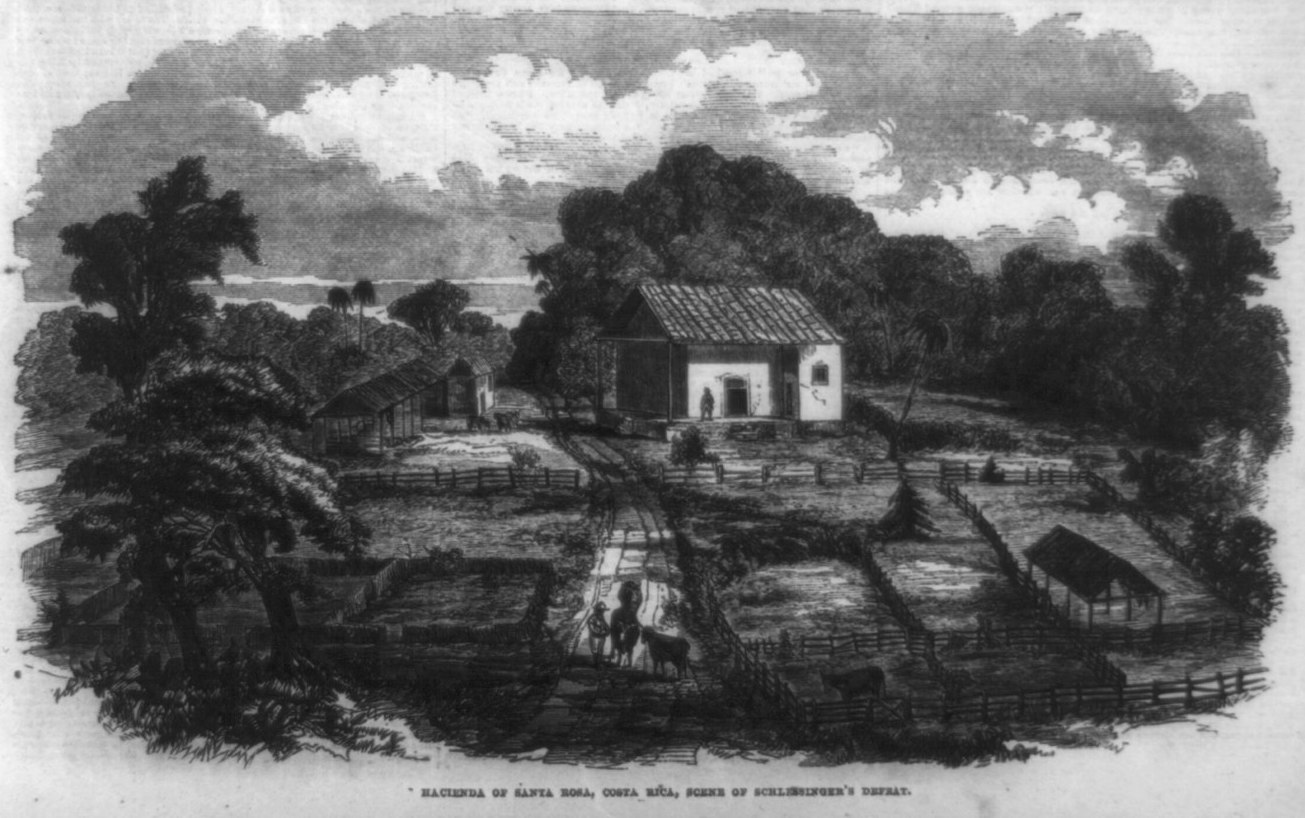
Hacienda of Santa Rosa

The Costa Ricans, meanwhile, advanced to Santa Rosa and at 4 o'clock on 20 March, armed with rifles, sabres, and bayonets, attacked, surrounded their enemies, who having not posted proper sentries, were taken by surprise after having stationed themselves in the casona and in the corrals. Under the sudden attack the Germans had broken and fled, while the French under Capt. Legaye, also retired from the broken ground they had attempted to occupy. In five minutes, the whole force was in disarray and in disorderly retreat; the Costa Ricans won the battle in fourteen minutes. Walker's troops suffered 59 killed and the Costa Ricans 20 killed.

The Santa Rosa's casona, one of the few historical sites, was burned down in May 2001 and later re-built.

The conflict was concluded on March 25. This first international victory of the Filibuster War battles, was a relevant event to demonstrate to Costa Ricans that their state had enough military capacity to defend them, a basic responsibility of a government.

== See also ==
- Second Battle of Rivas
