= 1849 Costa Rican general election =

- 2–9 December 1849
- Presidential election

90 members of the Electoral College 46 votes needed to win
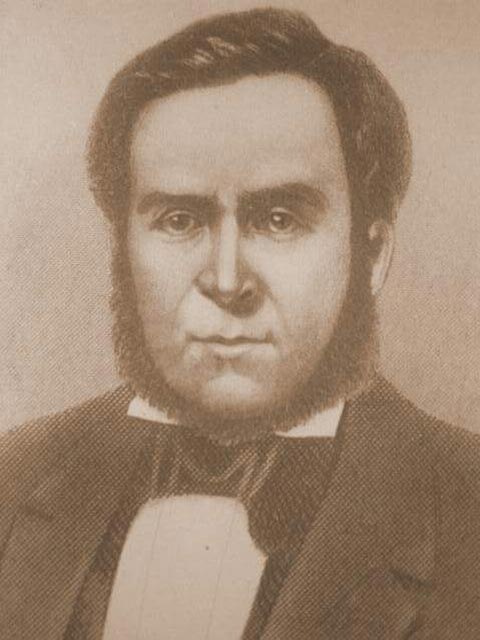

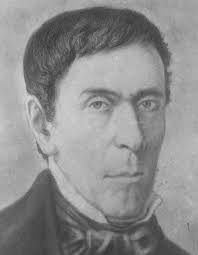

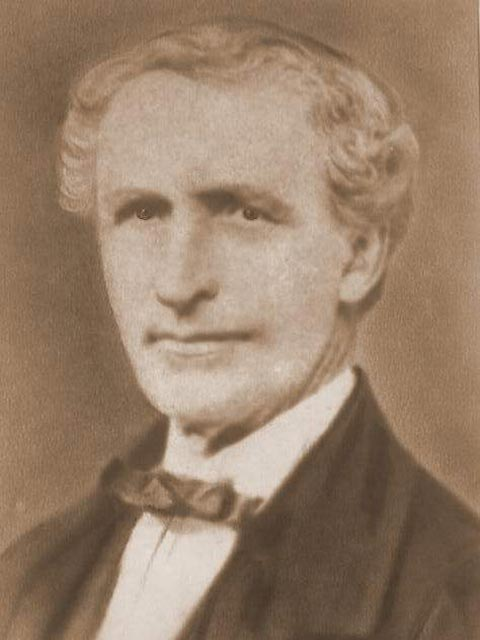
Nominee	Juan Rafael Mora Porras	Rafael Moya Murillo	Manuel Antonio Bonilla Nava
Party	Independent	Independent	Independent
Alliance	Morismo	–	Anti-morismo
Electoral vote	49	32	9
Percentage	54.44%	35.56%	10.00%
- Estimated results by province
President before election
Juan Rafael Mora Porras (acting)
Independent
Elected President
Juan Rafael Mora Porras
Independent

General elections were held in Costa Rica between 2 and 9 December 1849 to elect a president to complete the six-year term that had begun in 1847. These were the first presidential elections held after the constitutional reforms of 1848, which established the title of "President of the Republic", replacing the earlier designation of Head of State used between 1824 and 1847. Vice President Juan Rafael Mora Porras stood as a candidate to complete the term and was elected with 54.4% of the electoral vote.

The elections followed a period of political instability triggered by a threatened coup against President José María Castro Madriz, which led to his resignation. Congress subsequently appointed deputy Miguel Mora Porras as acting president until Juan Rafael Mora Porras was restored to the vice presidency and assumed the acting presidency. In the election, Mora defeated Rafael Moya Murillo and Manuel Antonio Bonilla Nava.

== Electoral system ==
Under the reformed 1847 Constitution in force at the time, suffrage was limited to male citizens over the age of 21 who owned immovable property valued at at least 300 pesos, earned an annual income of no less than 150 pesos, and were literate. As a result, electoral participation was largely confined to members of the bourgeoisie. The president was elected for a renewable six-year term.

Voters selected a total of 90 electors, who in the second-degree elections chose the president. San José elected 26 electors and Guanacaste 12, all of whom voted for Mora. The 17 electors from Heredia, the 12 from Alajuela, and the 2 from Puntarenas voted for Moya. Cartago elected 20 electors, of whom 11 voted for Mora, while the remaining 9—who were the only electors to do so—cast their votes for Bonilla.

== Results ==
Candidate	Votes	%
Juan Rafael Mora Porras	49	54.44
Rafael Moya Murillo	32	35.56
Manuel Antonio Bonilla Nava	9	10.00
Total	90	100.00
Source: TSE
