= 1887 in Costa Rica =

- Decades: 1860s; 1870s; 1880s; 1890s; 1900s
- See also: Other events of 1887; Timeline of Costa Rican history

Events in the year 1887 in Costa Rica.

== Incumbents ==
- President: Bernardo Soto Alfaro

== Births ==
- September 13 - Rodriguez Garcia-Uriza

== Deaths ==
- June 15 - Miguel Mora Porras
- September 26 - José María Montealegre
- October 17 - Rafael García-Escalante Nava
