= Battle of Hipp's Point (1856) =

Military engagement during the Filibuster war in Costa Rica

- Part of Filibuster War
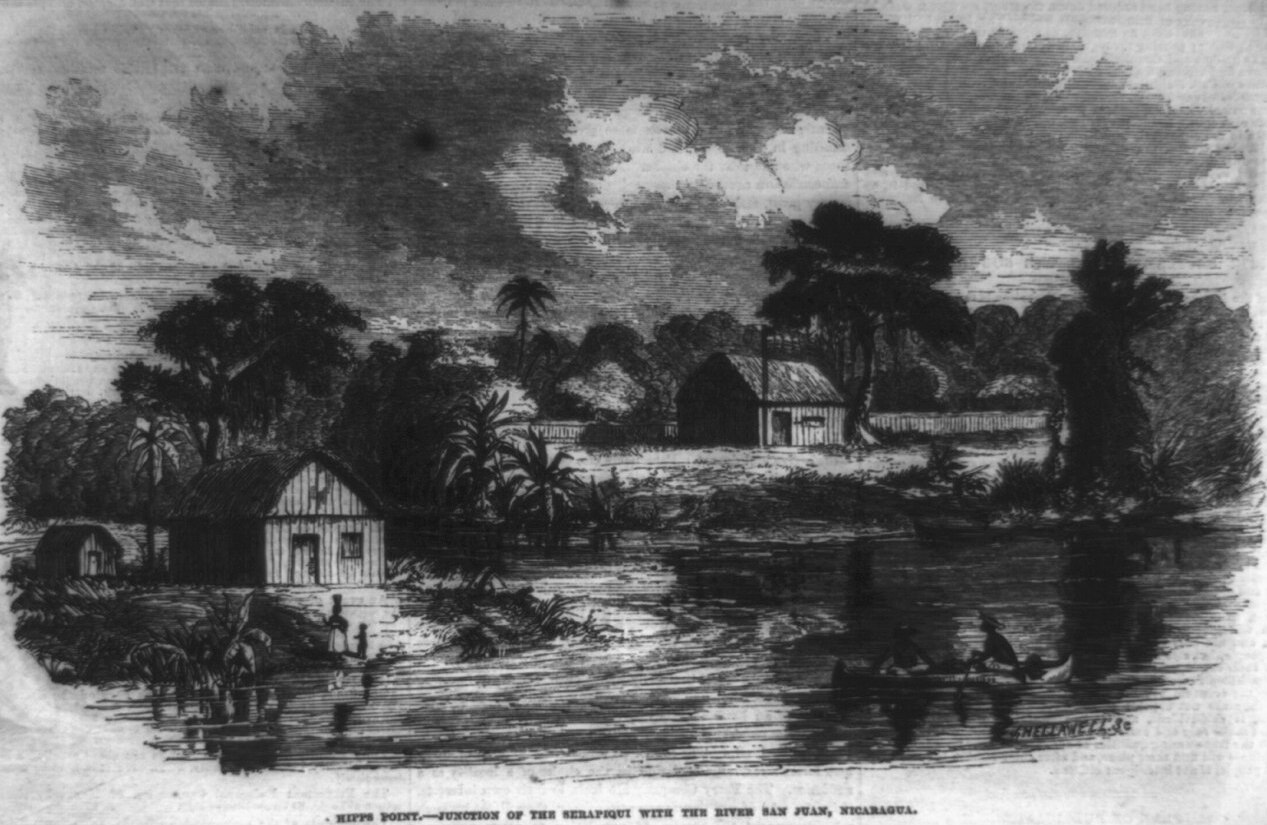
- Engraving of Hipp's Point
Date	December 22, 1856
Location	Hipp's Point or La Trinidad, mouth of the Sarapiquí River, Heredia, Costa Rica
Result	Costa Rican victory

Belligerents
Filibusters	Costa Rica

Commanders and leaders
Frank Thompson (POW)	Máximo Blanco; Sylvanus Spencer; Pierre Barillier

Strength
~70 filibusters	~130

Casualties and losses
~60 killed (on land and drowned), 2 captured.	2 wounded.

The Battle of Hipp's Point (also referred to as the Assault on Hipp's Point), also known in Central American historiography as the First Battle of La Trinidad, was a small but significant military engagement that occurred on December 22, 1856, at the confluence of the Sarapiquí River and the San Juan River, during the Filibuster War. This combat represented a crucial strategic victory for the Costa Rican Army, as it marked the beginning of the operation to capture the Transit Route, the main supply and reinforcement artery for William Walker's filibuster army.

== Background ==
=== Strategic plan and expedition departure ===
Following the first phase of the Filibuster War, President Juan Rafael Mora Porras understood that the only way to definitively defeat William Walker was by severing his supply line: the Transit Route. To achieve this, a vanguard column was organized to advance through the northern plains of Costa Rica, descend the San Carlos River, and launch surprise attacks on strategic points along the San Juan River.

At the onset of the expedition, command of the battalion was officially assigned to the French-born military officer Pierre Barillier (also known as Pedro or "The Zouave"). The mission also included the participation of American engineer Sylvanus Spencer, sent as the expedition chief and geographical guide, along with Sergeant Major Máximo Blanco.

=== Command disputes and the confidential letter ===
Once the troops entered the plains and approached their military objectives, strong tensions began to surface among the three leaders. On December 20, upon reaching the mouth of the San Carlos River, Spencer suggested occupying a firewood supply house to use as a decoy against the filibuster steamboats, a proposal that Barillier flatly refused.

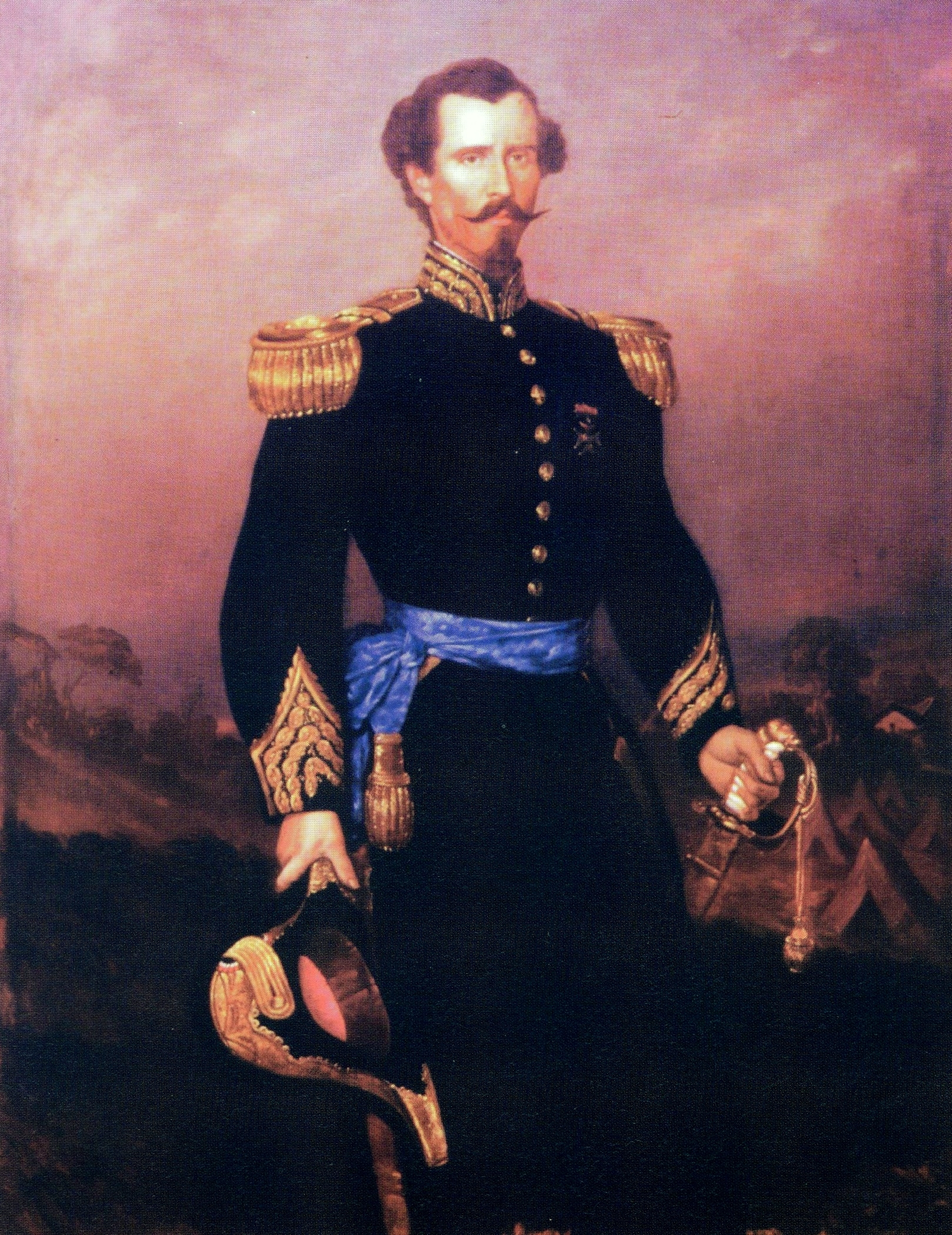
Máximo Blanco

According to Máximo Blanco's own diary, realizing that these arguments threatened to derail the entire enterprise, he decided to intervene. Blanco asserted supreme authority backed by "private instructions": a confidential letter that President Mora Porras had handed him in San José, with strict orders to open it only once they were in the theater of operations. Upon reading this document, Blanco de facto dismissed Barillier from the primary command and assumed absolute tactical leadership of the Costa Rican forces for the imminent assault.

=== The San Carlos River journey ===
The advance toward the objective was plagued by extreme climatic and geographical hardships from the moment they departed Muelle de San Carlos. Blanco recorded in his diary a series of near-catastrophic logistical mishaps:

- Loss of artillery: On the night of December 19, 1856, a sudden swell of the San Carlos River swept away the raft carrying the artillery pieces, a significant portion of the ammunition, and the soldiers' clothing, leaving the troops virtually without heavy weaponry. (The runaway raft was later found adrift in the San Juan River by a Nicaraguan citizen named Felipe Mena. Mena concealed the vessel among the riverside vegetation near his ranch, downstream from La Trinidad, preventing it from being spotted by the enemy garrison. Days later, Mena returned the two cannons, the remaining weaponry, and the clothing intact to the Costa Rican troops.)
- River accidents: The troops' inexperience with river navigation led to constant shipwrecks. One boat capsized, losing the remainder of the military park. This, coupled with hunger and the fear of whirlpools, triggered at least 13 desertions and left several men ill.

=== The element of surprise and the landing ===
Despite the disasters and the loss of the rafts, chance favored the Costa Ricans. On December 19, a filibuster lookout named Emilio Thomas warned his superiors about the presence of "suspicious rafts" coming down the river. However, his alert was ignored by Walker's command, which dismissed the possibility of an attack from that route.

After ruling out a frontal assault on Castillo Viejo due to the lack of suitable boats and the poor condition of their weapons, Blanco ordered the forces to head directly for the garrison of Hipp's Point (La Trinidad). On the night of December 21, the troops waited in their boats under a torrential downpour and in absolute silence to avoid detection by an enemy steamboat patrolling the area, preparing to land at dawn on the 22nd.

=== Preparations and tactical deployment ===
Following the rugged journey down the San Carlos River and evading the filibuster steamboat the previous night, the Costa Rican expedition landed at 5:00 a.m. on December 22, 1856, one mile from the enemy camp at Hipp's Point.

The troops were numb from the cold rain, and their weapons were soaked. To remedy this, they retreated into the dense forest and lit hidden fires to dry their rifles and gunpowder, ensuring the smoke would not alert the filibuster garrison. This delicate operation took five hours.

At 10:00 a.m., the troops resumed their march, hacking their way through mud and thorn bushes until they were positioned five hundred yards from the enemy camp. There, the Costa Rican command finalized its attack plan: Sergeant Major Máximo Blanco would lead an assault column of 30 men on the right flank, divided into four guerrilla units. Meanwhile, Sylvanus Spencer, Francisco Alvarado, and Joaquín Fernández would remain concealed on the left with the remaining 100 men, under strict orders to attack only upon hearing the vanguard's first volleys.

== The assault on Hipp's Point ==
Creeping forward stealthily, Blanco observed the filibusters completely distracted around a large table. He immediately ordered his 30 men to charge at a trot. However, due to the extreme humidity, only five rifles successfully fired during the initial volley.

The filibusters, though surprised, quickly reorganized and ran to take cover in their two trenches. The Costa Ricans' momentum allowed them to overrun the first trench immediately, but the enemy managed to dig in at the second. Faced with the sudden uselessness of their firearms, Blanco's troops were forced into a violent bayonet charge. During this intense melee, Corporal Nicolás Aguilar Murillo from Barva distinguished himself; motivated by a 500-peso reward offered by Joaquín Fernández for the most courageous act, Aguilar leaped over the enemy trench and skewered the sentry manning the cannon with his bayonet.

The hand-to-hand combat raged for about 40 minutes. The fall of the artilleryman and the imminent arrival of Spencer's 100 reinforcements broke the filibuster resistance, forcing the survivors to leap into the San Juan River.

A critical moment that ensured the strategic success of the assault occurred when a filibuster officer attempted to escape in a boat toward San Juan del Norte to sound the alarm. Anticipating that this would ruin the element of surprise for the remainder of the expedition, Blanco ordered a soldier to shoot the officer down, successfully neutralizing the threat.

== William Walker's account ==
In his book The War in Nicaragua, William Walker provided his own perspective on the battle, heavily criticizing his own commanding officer and attributing the Costa Rican success exclusively to the American guide, Sylvanus Spencer.

According to Walker's account, the filibuster company was eating their meal when they were completely surprised by the Costa Rican column. He blamed the defeat on the "gross and criminal negligence" of Captain Frank Thompson, noting that Thompson had failed to post sentries and that the soldiers' weapons were left out of reach while they ate. Walker also detailed that Spencer maneuvered to the rear of the camp and had a soldier climb a tree to accurately spy on Thompson's vulnerable position before attacking, resulting in a complete surprise where most of the Americans were killed or wounded.

Furthermore, Walker stated that "the success of Mora's operations on the San Juan River was due to the skill and daring of Spencer," claiming that the entire expedition would have been useless without the American's audacious actions. However, historiographical footnotes in the Spanish translations of Walker's work point out that Walker made these assertions out of "racial pride and hatred for the Costa Ricans," deliberately giving all the credit to his fellow American to diminish the valor, sacrifice, and tactical execution of the Costa Rican troops.

== Consequences and control of the river ==
The skirmish resulted in an overwhelming victory for the Central American forces. Of the more than sixty filibusters garrisoning the point, the vast majority perished in the trenches or drowned in the river. Nine dead were buried on-site, and two prisoners were taken, including the garrison's commander, Captain Frank Thompson. Only six filibusters managed to escape into the jungle. In contrast, the Costa Rican army reported only two wounded and zero fatalities during the assault.

After consolidating their position, the national soldiers secured valuable provisions, including barrels of meat and pots of freshly cooked food left behind by the enemy. Blanco left a small detachment of 30 men to guard the point, and at 6:00 p.m. that same day, the Costa Rican flotilla of five boats resumed its advance under heavy rain toward San Juan del Norte (Greytown).

The victory at Hipp's Point definitively unlocked the door to the Transit Route, enabling the subsequent capture of the filibuster steamboats on the Atlantic side and effectively severing the primary logistical artery of William Walker's army.

== Bibliography ==
- Blanco, Máximo (1857). "Diario que llevó el Sargento Mayor don Máximo Blanco en la expedición al río de San Juan por la vía de San Carlos". Revista del Archivo Nacional.
- Hilje, Luko (2023). "Aguas de libertad: los ríos del norte de Costa Rica en la Campaña Nacional de 1856-1857". Diálogos Revista Electrónica de Historia. 24 (2).
- Obregón Loría, Rafael (1976). Costa Rica y la Guerra del 56 (La Campaña del Tránsito). San José, Costa Rica: Editorial Costa Rica.
- Walker, William (1970). La Guerra de Nicaragua (in Spanish). Translated by Fernández Guardia, Ricardo. San José, Costa Rica: Editorial Costa Rica.
- Walker, William (1860). The War in Nicaragua. Mobile, Alabama: S.H. Goetzel & Co. LCCN 05009921. OCLC 1998938.
