= 1861 in Costa Rica =

Events in the year 1861 in Costa Rica.

== Incumbents ==
- President: José María Montealegre

== Births ==
- April 18 - Rafael Yglesias Castro, President 1894-1902 (d. 1924)
