= 1885 in Costa Rica =

- Decades: 1860s; 1870s; 1880s; 1890s; 1900s
- See also: Other events of 1885; Timeline of Costa Rican history

Events in the year 1885 in Costa Rica.

== Incumbents ==
- President: Próspero Fernández Oreamuno until March 12, Bernardo Soto Alfaro

== Deaths ==
- March 12 - Próspero Fernández Oreamuno
