= 1882 in Costa Rica =

- Decades: 1860s; 1870s; 1880s; 1890s; 1900s
- See also: Other events of 1882; Timeline of Costa Rican history

Events in the year 1882 in Costa Rica.

== Incumbents ==
- President: Tomás Guardia Gutiérrez until July 6, Saturnino Lizano Gutiérrez until July 20, Próspero Fernández Oreamuno

== Deaths ==
- July 6 - Tomás Guardia Gutiérrez
