= Sofía Matilde Joy Redman =

First Lady of Costa Rica (1859–1863)

Sofía Matilde Joy Redman (October 7, 1823 – January 14, 1908) was the First Lady of Costa Rica, from 1859 to 1863.

== History ==
She was born in London, England in 1823. Her parents were William Joy and Mary Redman. In 1823, Sofía was baptized after she and her family proclaimed their faith to the Anglican religion. She and her brothers moved to Costa Rica where she became a teacher. While she was teaching, she was hired by José María Montealegre who would later become her husband. Since José was both a Catholic and a widower, their relationship was frowned upon which made it very difficult for them to be together. Eventually, she married José in January 1858. They had three children together. They were Eduardo José Guillermo Montealegre Joy (born 1858); Josefina Carolina "Jessey" Montealegre Joy (born 1860); and Carolina Sofía Montealegre Joy (born 1861).

Not long after they were married, there was a military coup on August 14, 1859 which overthrew President Juanito Mora. Sofía's husband José was chosen to be the new interim President. Due to another outbreak of political disturbances in Costa Rica, Sofía along with her husband and three children fled to the United States for safety. They resided in San Francisco, California until Sofía's husband died of a heart attack and the earthquake of 1906 happened. After the earthquake happened, Sofía moved her family to Berkeley which is where they stayed for the rest of her life. Sofía died in 1908.
