= Vicente Aguilar Cubero =

Costa Rican politician (1806–1861)

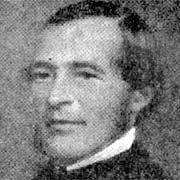
- Aguilar c. 1860

Second Designate to the Presidency
- In office 8 May 1860 – 26 April 1861
- President: José María Montealegre Fernández
- Preceded by: Position established
- Succeeded by: Juan Fernando Echeverría

Vice President of Costa Rica
- In office June 1856 – 1857
- President: Juan Rafael Mora Porras
- Preceded by: Francisco Oreamuno Bonilla
- Succeeded by: Rafael García-Escalante Nava

Secretary of War and Navy
- In office 1860–1861
- President: José María Montealegre Fernández
- In office 1859–1860
- President: Juan Rafael Mora Porras

Personal details
- Born: Vicente Aguilar Cubero; 5 April 1808 Cartago, Province of Costa Rica, Captaincy General of Guatemala, Spanish Empire
- Died: 26 April 1861 (aged 53) San José, Costa Rica
- Party: Independent
- Spouse: María Dolores Salazar Aguado (m. 1839)
- Children: 9

Vicente Aguilar Cubero (5 April 1808 – 26 April 1861) was a Costa Rican businessman and politician who served as Vice President of Costa Rica from 1856 to 1857. Initially a business associate of President Juan Rafael Mora Porras, he later broke with Mora and participated in the 1859 coup d’état that led to Mora’s removal from office.

== Biography ==
Vicente Aguilar Cubero was born on April 5, 1808, to José Alejo Aguilar and Joaquina Cubero Escalante. Aguilar Cubero was identified as mulatto when he was baptized and was the great-grandchild of a mulatto slave woman. He married on January 27, 1839 with Maria Dolores Salazar y Aguado.

Cubero played an important role in the development of coffee production in Costa Rica on a commercial level in the country and in doing so became one of the richest men in the country. During several years he had a commercial society with Juan Rafael Mora Porras, President of the Republic from 1849 to 1859 and was one of the conspirators involved in the 1859 coup.

During his political career he has several positions, among them Magistrate of the Supreme Court of Justice, Vice President of the Republic and President of the Congress (September–October 1856), Minister of Property, War, and the Navy (1859–1860), Second Designate to the Presidency (1860–1861) and then Secretary of Finance, War and the Navy (1860–1861).

== See also ==
- History of Costa Rica
- Politics of Costa Rica
