= José Joaquín Mora Porras =

Costa Rican military officer and politician (1818–1860)

General José Joaquín Mora Porras
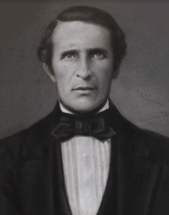

Personal details
- Born: José Joaquín Mora Porras; 21 February 1818 Alajuela, Province of Costa Rica, Captaincy General of Guatemala, Spanish Empire
- Died: 17 December 1860 (aged 42) San Salvador, El Salvador
- Relations: Juan Rafael Mora Porras (brother); Miguel Mora Porras (brother); Manuel Argüello Mora (nephew)
- Awards: Cross of Honor

Military service
- Allegiance: Costa Rica
- Years of service: 1830–1859
- Rank: General
- Commands: Commander-in-chief of the Army (1850-1859); Commandancy of San José (1852)
- Battles/wars: Filibuster War

José Joaquín Mora Porras (21 February 1818 – 17 December 1860) was a Costa Rican military officer and politician. He was the younger brother of the presidents of that country, Juan Rafael Mora Porras and Miguel Mora Porras, and was deputy commander of the armed forces in San Jose, Costa Rica.

During the war against the filibusters, he played an important role as deputy commander in chief of the army of Costa Rica and Central forces chief.

In the port of Puntarenas, Costa Rica there exists a series of tiled murals on low walls arrayed around the more modern, single water tower. This location is purportedly where he would be executed by firing squad.

His great-great-granddaughter is actress Madeleine Stowe.
