= Costa Rican Constitution of 1859 =

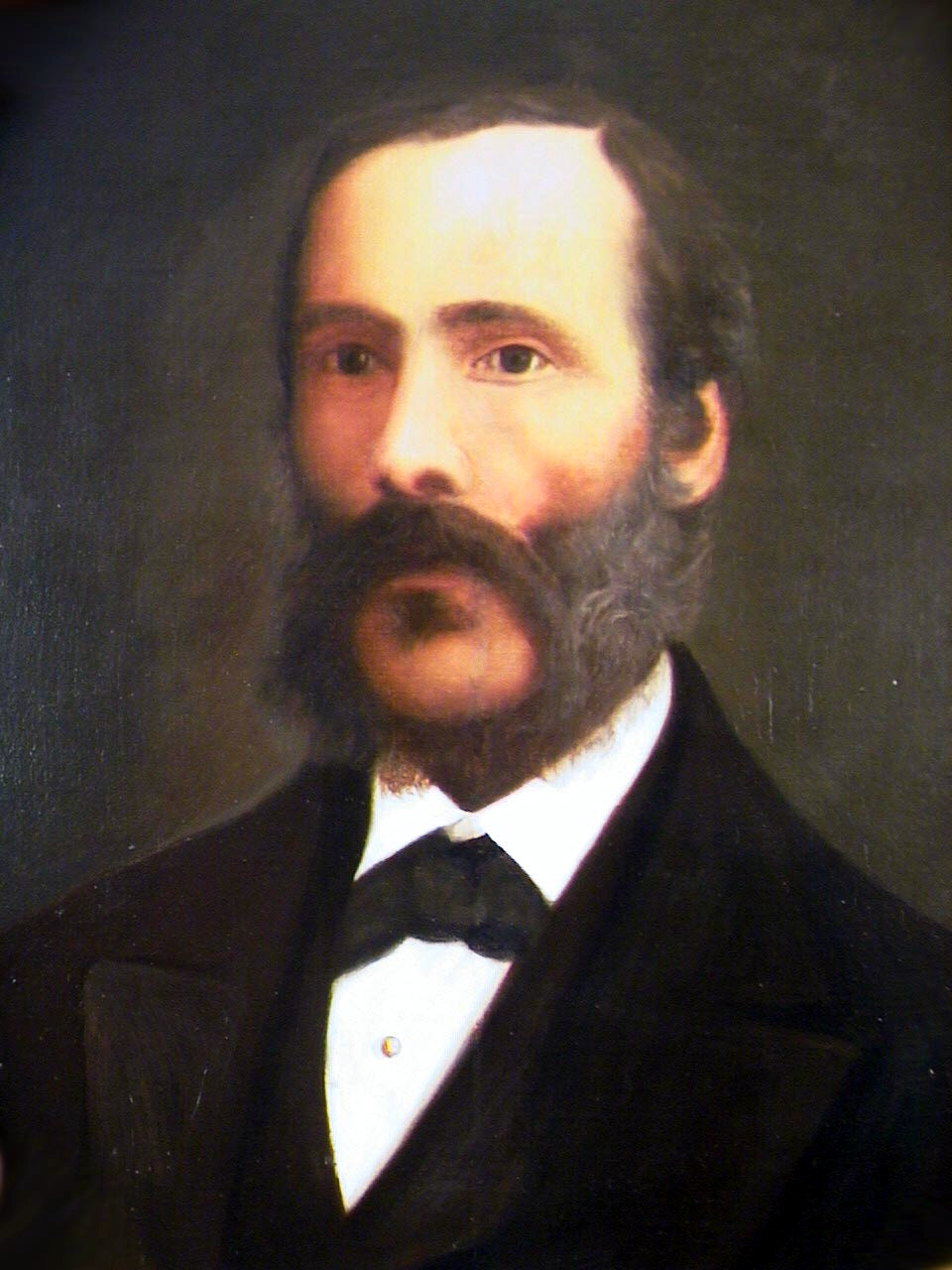
José María Montealegre Fernández

The Political Constitution of Costa Rica of 1859 was issued on 27 December 1859. It was in force until 1 November 1868 and also, partially, from August to October 1870.

The pronouncement of 14 August 1859 proclaimed José María Montealegre Fernández as Provisional President of the Republic. On the 23rd of that same month, Montealegre called for elections for a Constituent Assembly, which opened its sessions on 16 October 1859, under the presidency of former President José María Castro Madriz. On 18 October, a commission was made to draft the Constitution, which proposed to take as a model the Constitution of 1844, despite the poor experience with it. The Assembly devoted long hours to review the articles of 1844, but the work soon stalled and on 8 November it was decided to appoint another commission, which drafted a new project. This second commission worked diligently and on 21 November presented to the consideration of the constituent body the fruit of its labors, which was a sober and balanced document, inspired by democratic and liberal ideas and which sought to correct the many defects of form and substance of the 1848 Constitution. The Assembly discussed it with relative speed. Finally, on 26 December the Assembly approved the new Political Constitution, which was signed by President Montealegre the following day and published without delay.

== Content ==
The Political Constitution of 1859 consisted of 142 articles distributed in eleven titles.

- Title I dealt with the Republic, declared that sovereignty resided in the nation and indicated the limits of Costa Rica. In this text, it was established for the first time that the boundary with Nicaragua was defined by the Cañas-Jerez Treaty of 1858.
- Title II dealt with the government, indicated its characteristics and enunciated the tripartite division of powers.
- Title III referred to the religion and stated that the Catholic Church was the state religion of the Republic, that it was protected by the Government and that it did not contribute its revenues to the expenses of other faiths.
- Title IV referred to national and individual guarantees. The so-called national guarantees were certain principles and substantial foundations of the action of public power, such as the principles of constitutional supremacy, reserve of law in tax matters and subordination of military force to civil power. The individual guarantees were civil and political rights, which were listed in detail and breadth. The habeas corpus guarantee was established for the first time.
- Title V contained the regulation of nationality and citizenship.
- Title VI referred to suffrage, which was exercised through an indirect system in two degrees, the second of which was based on property qualifications (censitary).
- Title VII regulated the Legislative Branch, which was bicameral. The Congress was divided into two Chambers, one of Senators and another of Representatives, which were renewed in halves every two years. Representatives were elected on a numerical basis, and Senators were made up of two members from each province. The chambers had initiative and reciprocal sanction in the formation of the law, and the bills approved by both passed to the Executive, who could sanction or veto them. In the latter case, the project could be resealed by two-thirds vote of the chambers. In addition, these met as Congress to make certain specific decisions, such as declaring the result of the presidential elections, approving international treaties, suspending by three quarters of votes the constitutional order and appointing the Magistrates and two appointees to the presidency. These, elected annually, were intended to replace the President of the Republic in his temporary or absolute absences.
- Title VIII was about the Executive Power. The Head of the Nation would be the President of the Republic, was elected for a period of three years, without the possibility of successive reelection. The President had the right of veto and retained the power to appoint and dismiss freely the Secretaries of State and the other employees of the Executive, but on the whole their powers were much lower than in the Reformed Constitution of 1848. To exercise the right of grace and to make diplomatic and consular appointments, the President required the agreement of the Council of State, which consisted of the Secretaries, and in addition to these functions discussed, deliberated and issued an opinion on the matters submitted by the chief executive.
- Title IX referred to the Judiciary and regulated various aspects of the administration of justice. The Supreme Court of Justice would be formed by a Regent, five Magistrates and a Prosecutor, who should have the title of lawyer and were elected every four years by the Legislative Branch.
- Title X was about the municipal regime. The country was divided into provinces, cantons and districts. In each province there would be a Governor appointed by the Executive branch, and in its capital a Municipality.
- Title XII referred to the observance of the Constitution, the constitutional oath and the amendments to the fundamental Charter. At the beginning of its ordinary sessions, the Legislative branch had to examine whether the Constitution had been exactly observed and provide what was convenient to enforce the responsibility of the offenders.4 Every public official should swear to observe the Constitution and the laws. It was absolutely forbidden to reform the Constitution during its first four years of validity. After that term, in any of the chambers could be submitted a draft partial revision of the Constitution, signed by at least a third of the members present, and then had to be approved by two thirds of votes in each of the Chambers and by the absolute majority of the Congress. The project then went to the Executive, who, after having heard the Council of State, presented it with its annual message to the Congress at the next ordinary meeting of the latter. The Congress then had to approve again the modification by two thirds of votes. For the general reform of the Constitution it was necessary to convene a Constituent Assembly, after the respective project followed the procedures of partial reform.

== General view ==
The Constitution of 1859 worked satisfactorily for several years. This was due in part to the prohibition of successive presidential re-election and the appropriate balance that was established between the legislative and executive branches, without the extremism of some previous texts. It is still considered one of the best constitutions to have governed Costa Rica, and the Constituent Assembly of 1880 took it as a model for its work.
