= Costa Rican Constitution of 1847 =

Constitution

Political Constitution of the State of Costa Rica
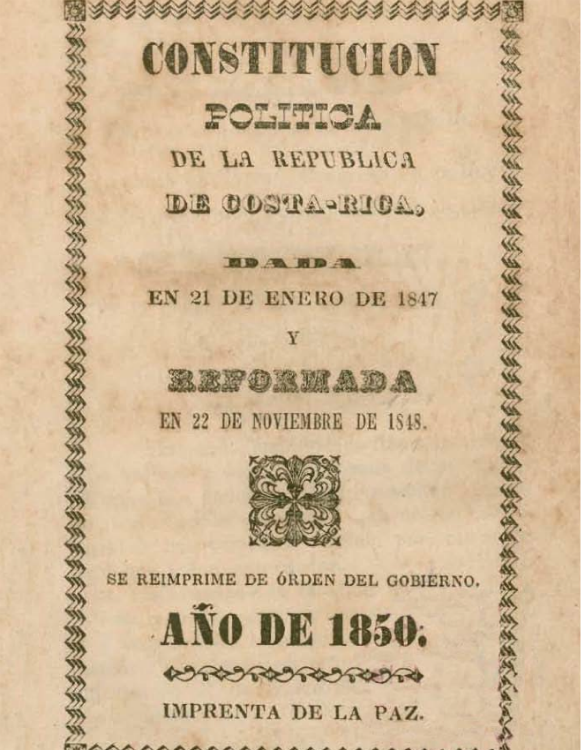
- Cover of the text, National Library

Overview
- Original title: Constitución Política de Costa Rica
- Jurisdiction: State of Costa Rica
- Created: 1846
- Date effective: February 10, 1847

Government structure
- Branches: Executive, Legislative
- Executive: President and Vice President
- Repealed: 1859
- Last amended: 1848
- Location: National Library
- Commissioned by: Interim government of José María Alfaro Zamora
- Author: Constituent Assembly
- Supersedes: Costa Rican Constitution of 1844
- Superseded by: Costa Rican Constitution of 1859

The Political Constitution of the State of Costa Rica was promulgated on February 10, 1847 under the interim government of José María Alfaro Zamora who convened a Constituent Assembly for that purpose through elections on August 23, 1846.

This was the first Constitution that established the figure of the Vice President, as well as two ministers; of Relations, Governance, Justice and Ecclesiastical Businesses and of Finance, Public Education, War and Navy. The municipalities are also restricted to mentioning that there will be one Governor per Department.

In 1848, a series of reforms to the Constitution were carried out, again via the Constituent Assembly, which, among other things, changed the name of the country of State of Costa Rica to the Republic of Costa Rica and granted greater powers to the Executive Branch, especially in matters of public appointments. and administrative decisions, that is, it is getting closer and closer to presidentialism.
