= Miguel Mora Porras =

Costa Rican politician (1816–1887)

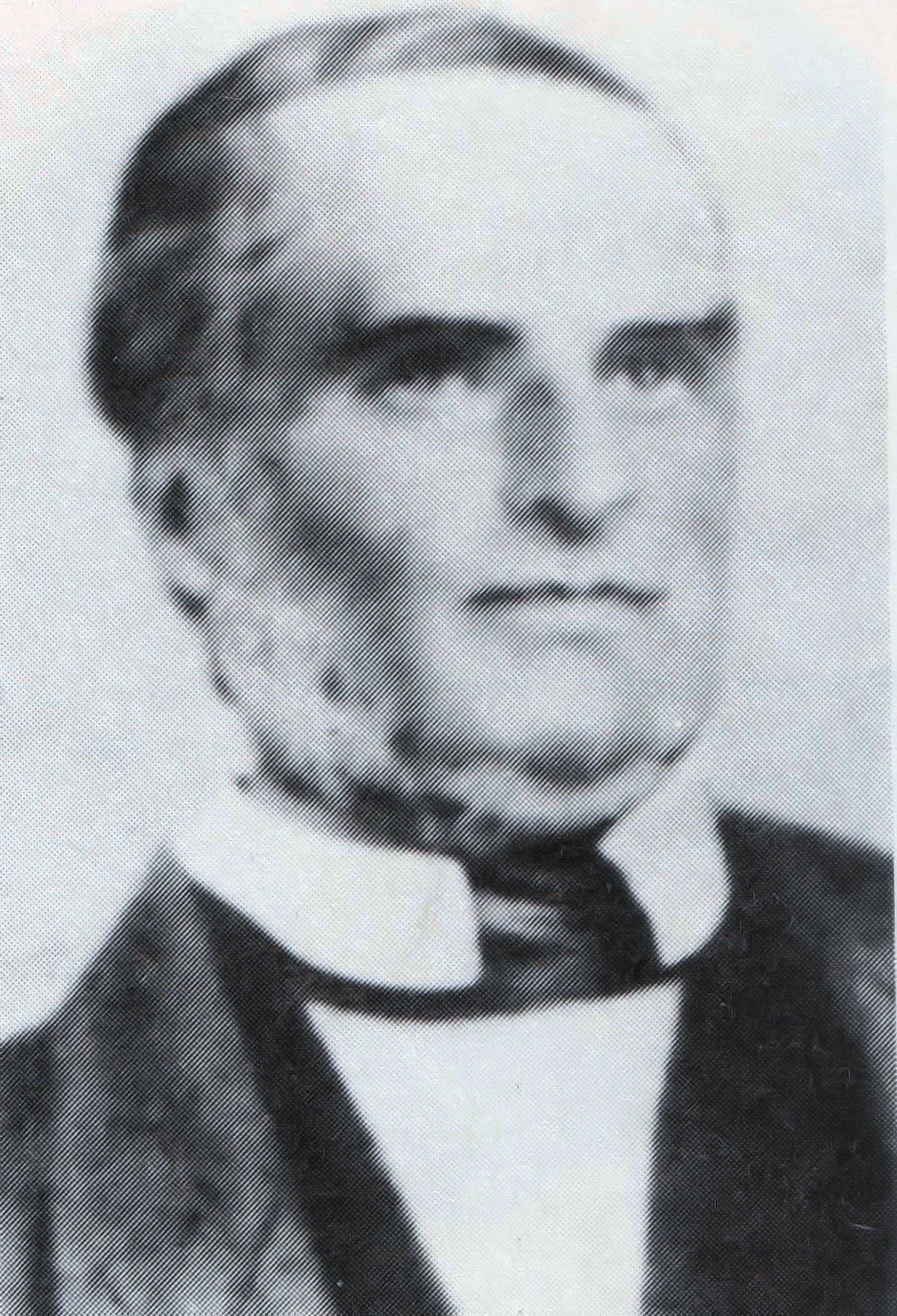
Miguel Mora Porras.

José Miguel Mora Porras (29 September 1816 – 15 June 1887) was interim President of Costa Rica from 15 November to 26 November 1849, when he turned over power to his older brother Juan Rafael Mora Porras.

Political offices
Preceded by José María Castro Madriz	President of Costa Rica; 1849	Succeeded by Juan Rafael Mora Porras
