= Manuel Argüello Mora =

Costa Rican writer and novelist (1834–1902)

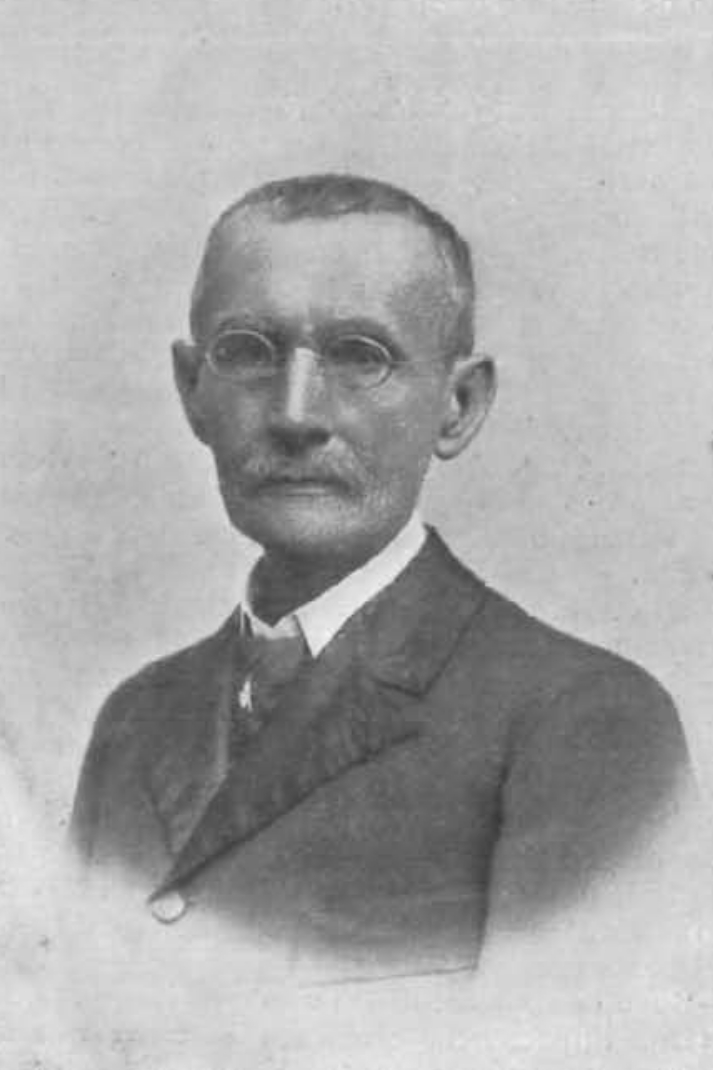
- Argüello in 1900

Fourth Designate to the Presidency
- In office 23 April 1881 – 10 August 1882
- President: Tomás Guardia Gutiérrez; Saturnino Lizano Gutiérrez
- Preceded by: Office established
- Succeeded by: Office abolished

Personal details
- Born: 1834 San José, Costa Rica, Federal Republic of Central America
- Died: 1902 (aged 67–68) San José, Costa Rica
- Party: Independent
- Profession: Lawyer; politician; judge; writer; journalist

Manuel Argüello Mora (1834 – 1902) was one of the foremost Costa Rican writers, and with 1888's Misterio, its first novelist.

He obtained his education at the University of Santo Tomás in Costa Rica and the Universidad de San Carlos in Guatemala, where he obtained a degree in law. Orphaned at a young age, he was brought up by his uncle Juan Rafael Mora Porras, the president of Costa Rica between 1849 and 1859, and his historical novel La trinchera recounts Mora Porras' campaign against William Walker's forces in Nicaragua in 1856. After Mora Porras was deposed, he followed his uncle into exile in Europe in 1859. He returned in 1860 during Mora Porras' attempt to regain power, and was spared from the firing squad which executed the former president. Between 1860 and 1902, he served on the Costa Rican Supreme Court and was the rector of the University of Santo Tomás. Along with writing within a number of genres, he also founded the weekly newspaper La Reforma.

He died in San José in 1902.

== Bibliography ==
- Luisa (novella, 1887)
- Mi familia (cuadros de costumbre, 1888)
- Misterio (novel, 1888)
- El huerfanillo de Jericó (novel, 1888)
- Costa Rica pintoresca (short story, 1899)
- Margarita (historical novel, 1899)
- Elisa Delmar (historical novel, 1899)
- La trinchera (historical novel, 1899)
- La bella herediana. El amor a un leproso (short story, 1900)
