= Juan Rafael Mora Porras =

President of Costa Rica from 1849 to 1859

Captain general Juan Rafael Mora Porras
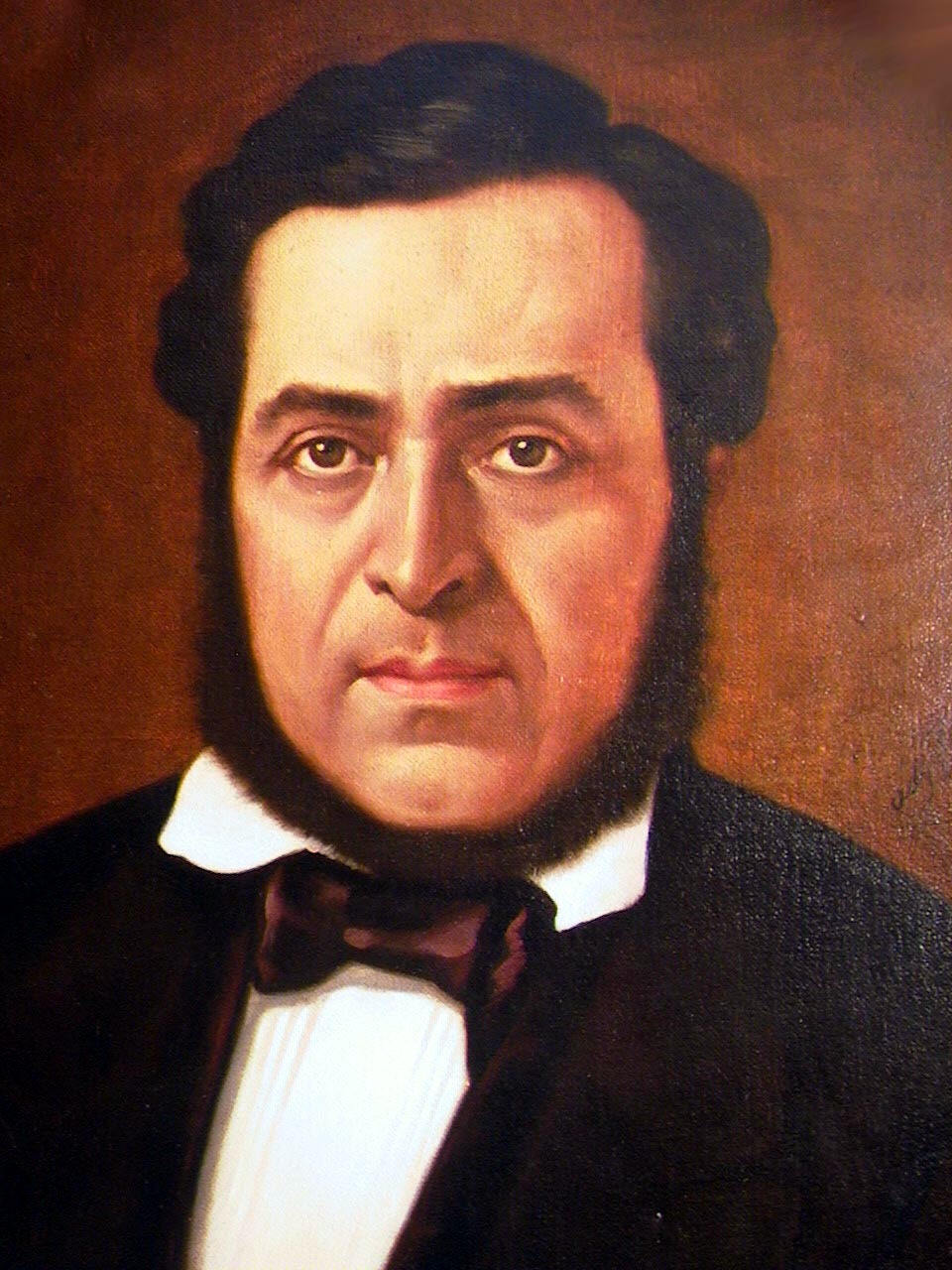
- Portrait by Aquiles Bigot

2nd President of Costa Rica
- In office 26 November 1849 – 14 August 1859; Acting: 26 November – 30 December 1849
- Vice President: Francisco María Oreamuno Bonilla; Vicente Aguilar Cubero; Rafael García-Escalante Nava
- Preceded by: Miguel Mora Porras (acting)
- Succeeded by: José María Montealegre

Vice President of Costa Rica
- In office 26 November 1849 – 30 December 1849
- President: Himself (acting)
- Preceded by: Manuel Carazo Bonilla
- Succeeded by: Francisco Oreamuno Bonilla
- In office 16 November 1847 – 30 June 1848
- President: José María Castro Madriz
- Preceded by: José María Alfaro Zamora
- Succeeded by: Manuel Carazo Bonilla

Additional positions
- 1846-1847: Member of the Constituent Assembly
- 1837: First Mayor of San José

Personal details
- Born: 8 February 1814 San José, Captaincy General of Guatemala, Spanish Empire
- Died: 30 September 1860 (aged 46) Puntarenas, Costa Rica
- Party: Independent
- Spouse: Inés Aguilar Cueto (m. 1847)
- Children: 8
- Relatives: José Joaquín Mora Porras (brother); Miguel Mora Porras (brother); Manuel Aguilar Chacón (father-in-law); José María Cañas (brother-in-law); José María Montealegre (brother-in-law); Juan Mora Fernández (second cousin); Manuel Argüello Mora (nephew)
- Occupation: Merchant; businessman; politician; farmer; landowner
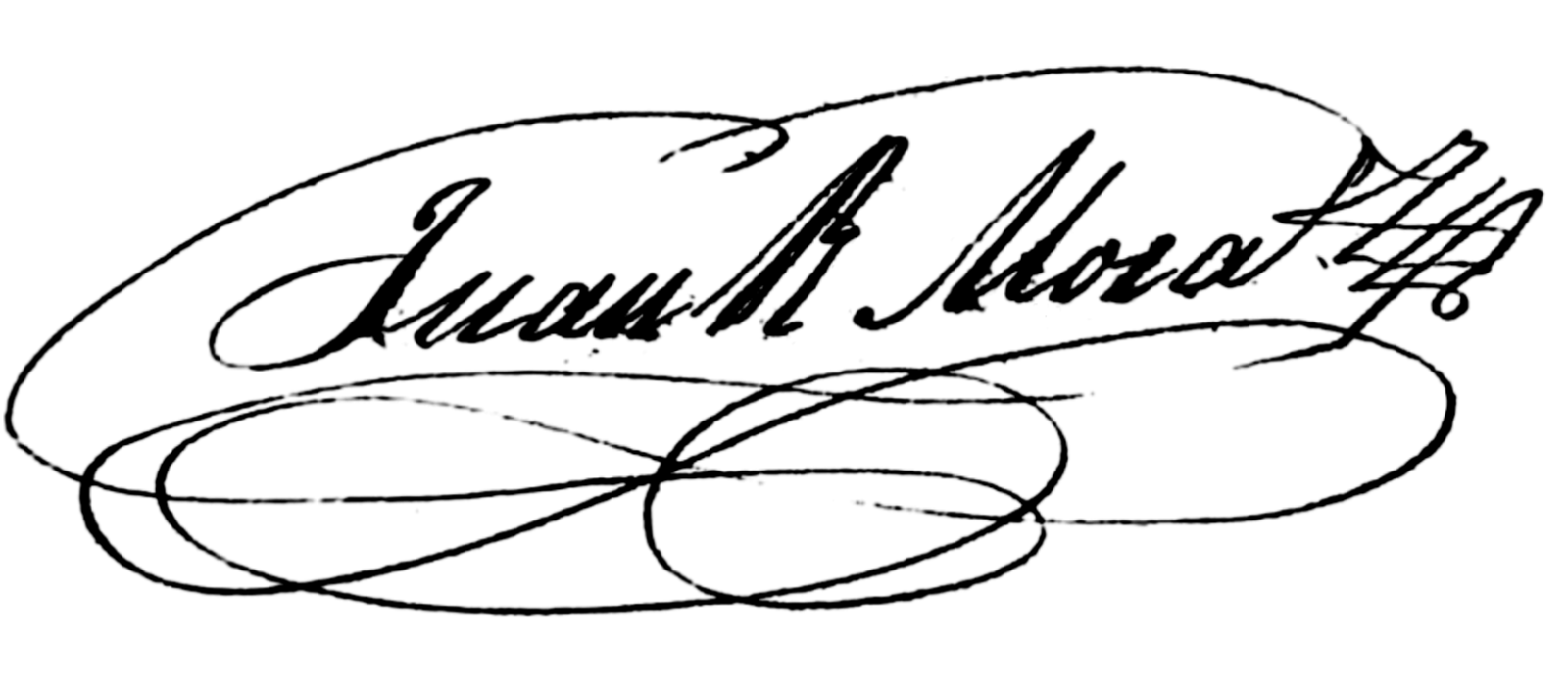
- Signature

Juan Rafael Mora Porras, widely known as Don Juanito (8 February 1814 – 30 September 1860), was a Costa Rican merchant and politician who served as the 2nd President of Costa Rica for three consecutive terms (1849–1859). He came to office in 1849 after his predecessor was overthrown in a coup, and lost office himself in 1859 after being overthrown in a coup.

He is especially recognized for leading the country to victory over the filibusters led by William Walker during the Filibuster War. Because of his leadership in this campaign, the Legislative Assembly of Costa Rica officially declared him a "national hero and liberator" on 16 September 2010. He remains one of the most recognized and important figures in Costa Rican history.

== Life and family ==
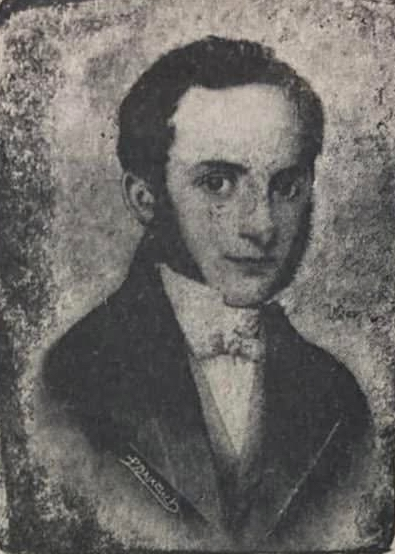
Mora in his youth

The marriage of Camilo Mora Alvarado and Ana Benita Porras Ulloa—a liberal family among the founders of the current Costa Rican capital—produced four children who belonged to the country's political and social elite. Not only did Juan Rafael become president, but his brother Miguel also briefly held the presidency in 1849, while another brother, José Joaquín, achieved the rank of general. His sisters Ana María and Guadalupe were married to José María Montealegre Fernández (who would govern Costa Rica from 1859 to 1863) and José María Cañas Escamilla, a general of Salvadoran origin, respectively.

Don Juanito married Inés Aguilar de Mora in San José on 24 June 1847. She was the daughter of Manuel Aguilar Chacón, who served as Head of State from 1837 to 1838. The couple had eight children: Elena, Teresa, Alberto, Amelia, Juan de Dios, Camilo, Juana, and Antonio.

He was sworn in as the First Mayor of San José on 15 May 1837. He held other public offices, such as a member of the Constituent Assembly of 1846–1847, though his primary activities were commerce, coffee and sugar cane cultivation, and real estate. In 1842, Mora, who lacked a university education, formed a partnership with Vicente Aguilar that soon became one of the most powerful commercial firms of the era.

== Political life ==
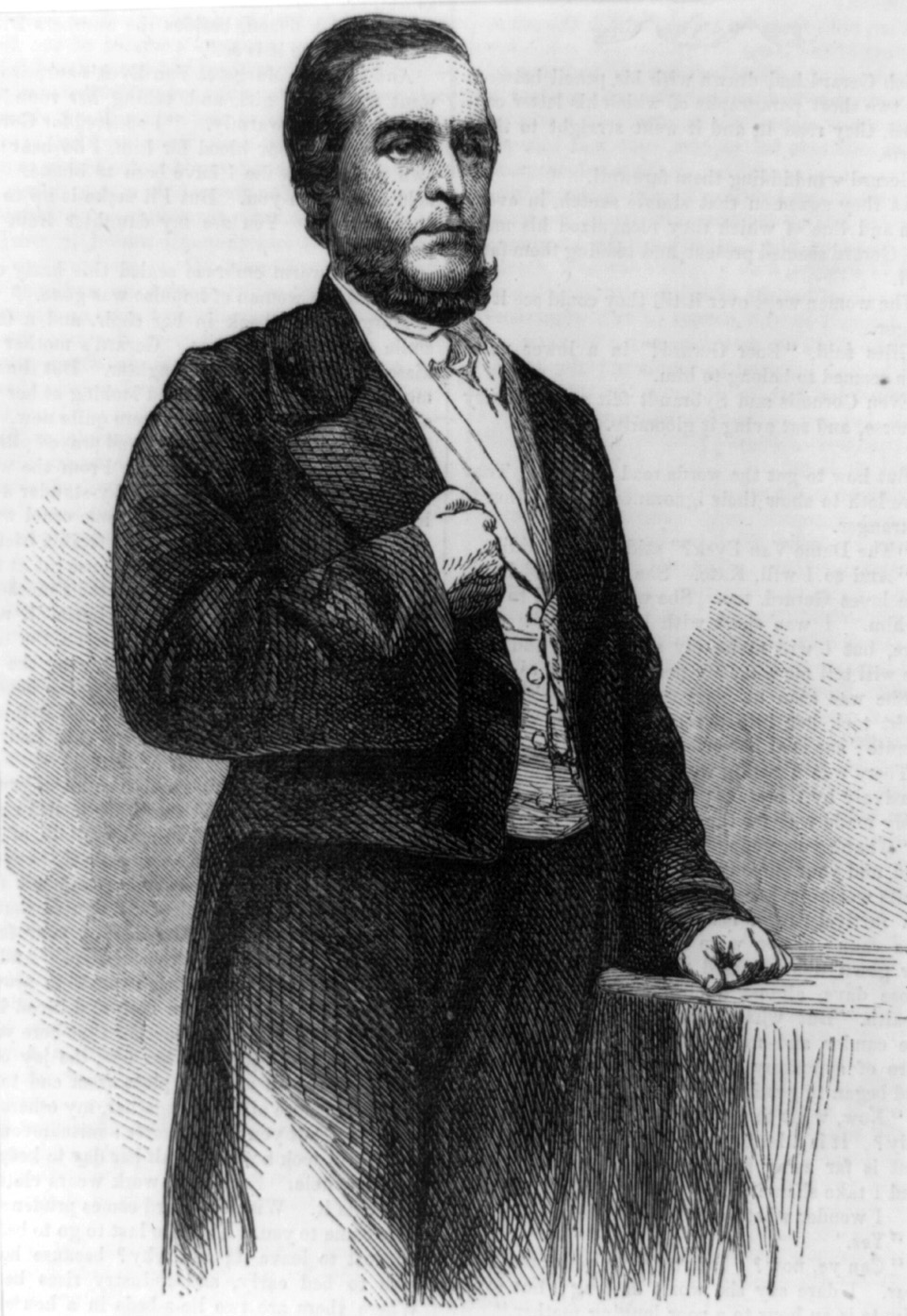
Juan Rafael Mora Porras, 1859

In 1847, he was elected Vice President of the State, a position he resigned from the following year, only to return to it the year after. The military coup led by General José Manuel Quirós y Blanco, which forced President José María Castro Madriz to resign, made Mora the country's acting ruler until the election of his successor was declared—an election that Mora himself won. The election has been described as "farcical."

Among the early successes of his government were the recognition of Costa Rican independence by Spain and the creation of the Diocese of Costa Rica by Pope Pius IX (1 March 1850). Its first bishop, Anselmo Llorente y La Fuente, was consecrated the following year in Guatemala.

In an era when the military held significant influence over national politics, the existence of only one military barracks allowed its commander to easily collude with powerful families to overthrow presidents. To counter this, Mora decided to create a second barracks, signalling his distrust of Quirós, the most powerful military figure at the time. Quirós understood this move and took up arms on 3 June 1850, but the forces sent by Mora defeated him.

The Constitutional Congress conferred upon him the title of Benemérito de la Patria (Meritorious of the Homeland) by Decree No. LXXXVI on 25 June 1850.

Despite his triumph over Quirós, Mora faced an intelligent opposition led by Castro Madriz and a largely hostile Congress. He even submitted his resignation, which was not accepted. Don Juanito then opted to dissolve the chamber and call for new elections to secure a loyal Parliament, which he successfully achieved.

He was re-elected in 1853. During this term, he improved the road from Cartago to the port of Puntarenas, a route that helped accelerate the country's economic development, and enacted other progressive measures.

=== War against the filibusters ===
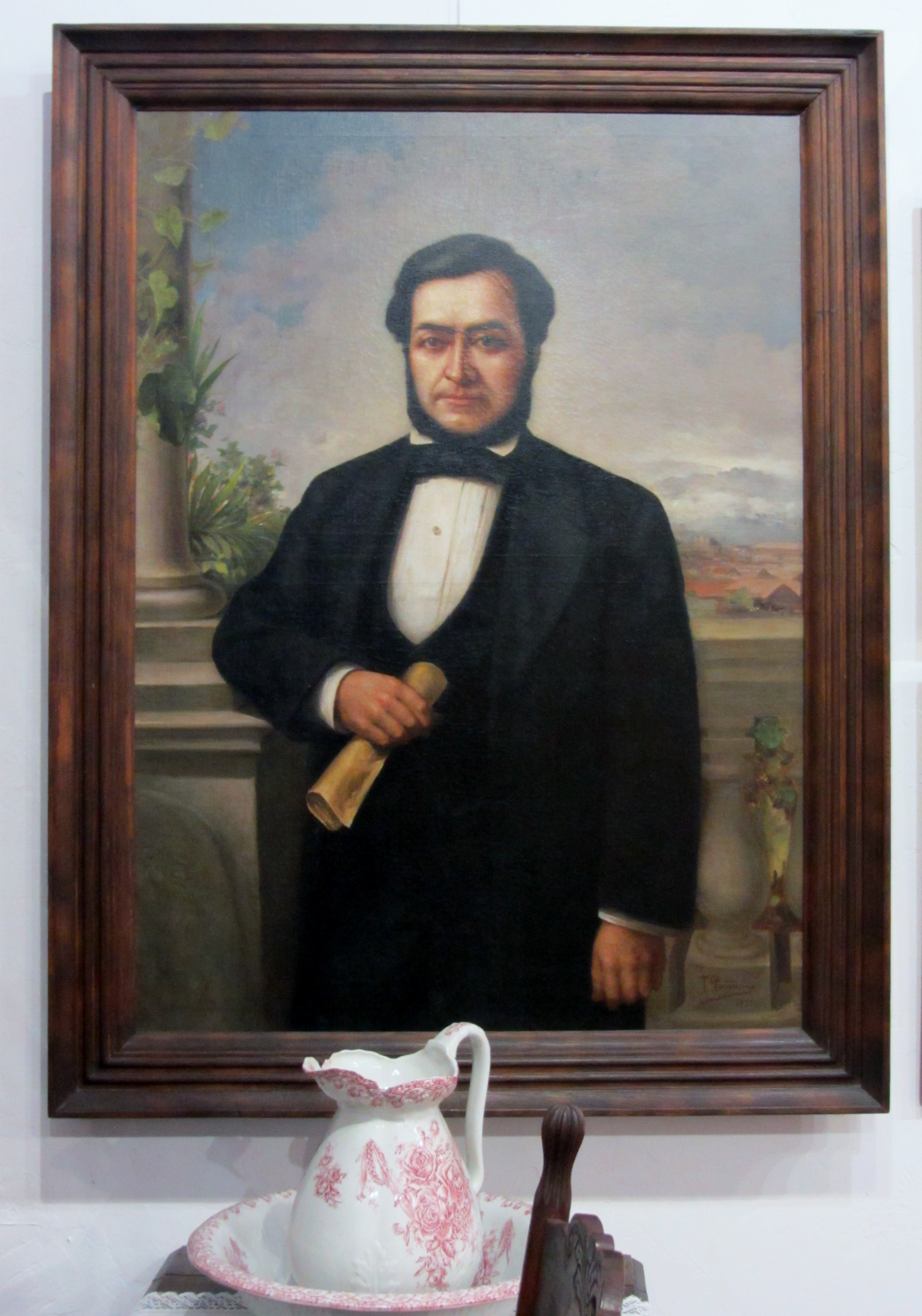
"His height is barely one meter sixty. Sturdily built, with a full face and a short neck. Black hair, combed straight back, and a thick chin beard. Slightly dark skin. A broad forehead, showing clear intelligence. Long eyebrows, penetrating gaze. Thin upper lip, Roman nose. He walks firmly, carrying a cane with an ivory handle. He speaks softly and directly. He sleeps early, rises early, and takes a siesta. A Catholic, he attends Mass. Of refined manners, he dresses in the French style with patent leather shoes, and on solemn occasions, he wears a simple black tailcoat. He prefers English pens, ink, and paper. Affable by nature, his placid physiognomy expresses more kindness than energy. Out of affection, many call him Don Juanito." — Armando Vargas Araya. 2007.

In early 1856, Costa Rica was forced into the conflict known as the National Campaign of 1856–1857 to expel William Walker from Central American territory. In the first phase of the war, during which Mora personally accompanied the troops (delegating executive power to Vice President Francisco María Oreamuno Bonilla), the Costa Rican army was victorious at the Battle of Santa Rosa (Costa Rica), the Battle of Sardinal, and the Battle of Rivas. However, in the days that followed, a cholera epidemic broke out and began devastating the army's ranks. By Mora's decision, the troops abandoned Nicaragua and returned to Costa Rica. The disease subsequently spread throughout much of the country, killing approximately 10,000 people—nearly a tenth of the Costa Rican population at the time.

Once the cholera epidemic ran its course by December, preparations began for the second campaign, whose main objective was to take control of the San Juan River and the steamboats that supplied Walker from the United States. The magnate Cornelius Vanderbilt, as a way to collaborate in the war (and primarily to recover the ships of his Accessory Transit Company that Walker had handed over to competitors), sent the mariner Sylvanus Spencer, who knew the river well, to guide the troops. The war concluded in April 1857, after Major Máximo Blanco with Spencer's help successfully cut off the filibusters' supply lines via the San Juan River campaign. Historians have linked this victory to a longer-term process of state consolidation in Costa Rica: the frequency of elite rebellions and coups declined markedly in the following decades, a trajectory that diverged sharply from that of Nicaragua, where postwar instability persisted.

The victory brought Mora immense glory, but relations with Nicaragua soon deteriorated. Walker, after surrendering on 1 May 1857 in Rivas, began preparing another expedition. In Nicaragua, he was replaced in the presidency by Tomás Martínez, who demanded that Costa Rica immediately return Punta Castilla, Castillo Viejo, and the San Carlos fort, as well as the ships seized from the filibusters, and ordered Costa Rican troops to leave Nicaraguan soil. Mora, aware of Walker's new plans, ordered his troops to remain on the San Juan to thwart any new filibuster incursions. Martínez accused Costa Rica of imperialist intentions and declared war on 19 October 1857. General Cañas was tasked with negotiating, a process that ended with the signing of the Cañas-Jerez Treaty, which was unfavourable to Costa Rica as it recognized Nicaragua's absolute ownership of the San Juan River, leaving Costa Rica with only limited access for free navigation on the lower course.

In early 1859, Mora was re-elected for a third term, but on 14 August of that year, he was overthrown by the commanders of the San José barracks, Colonel Lorenzo Salazar and Major Blanco. At 3:30 a.m., Sergeant Sotero Rodríguez unexpectedly arrived at Mora's home and escorted him to the barracks under arrest. In the following hours, his brother José Joaquín, General Cañas, Manuel Argüello (the president's nephew and advisor), and other officials were also captured, taken to Puntarenas, and expelled from the country aboard the steamer Guatemala bound for El Salvador. The two coup leaders were promoted to the rank of general by José María Montealegre, the new president, who belonged to the family that had orchestrated the plot against Mora's government.

=== Attempt to regain power and death ===
In exile, Don Juanito prepared an invasion to recover power, traveling to the United States in search of aid and weapons. On 17 September 1860, he landed in Puntarenas accompanied by his brother General José Joaquín, his brother-in-law General Cañas, and his nephew Manuel Argüello. The loyalist forces took the city and seized a strip of land reaching the Barranca River. The Montealegre government reacted swiftly, sending a military force that defeated Mora at the Battle of La Angostura. Don Juanito sought asylum with his friend, the British consul Richard Farrer, but Farrer ultimately turned him over to the authorities.

Mora was executed by firing squad in a location called Los Lobos on 30 September 1860, alongside General Ignacio Arancibia. Two days later, General Cañas was also executed.

According to research by journalist and historian Armando Vargas Araya, the Montealegre and Castro Madriz families paid for historical forgeries to justify the assassination of the beloved national hero. Their true motivation was to recover the lucrative family businesses of liquor sales and the private currency-issuing bank, which Mora had previously nationalized to stabilize the country's economy. Due to the systematic opposition from the descendants of these families. Mora was not officially recognized as a National Hero until 2010.

=== Burial ===
A group of friends—including the British and French consuls (Richard Farrer and Juan Bonnefil), Santiago Costantine, Julio Rosat, and Captain Francisco Roger—managed to prevent Mora's body from being thrown into the sea. They buried him on the day of his execution in the old estuary cemetery in a grave they dug themselves. Two days later, they also buried Cañas. Nearly six years later, on 20 May 1866, Bonnefil returned with Constantine and four sailors to exhume the bodies. They were kept secretly in San José for over 20 years until 13 January 1885, when they were finally moved to the General Cemetery of the capital.

== Legacy ==
Public works and achievements during the administration of Juan Rafael Mora Porras

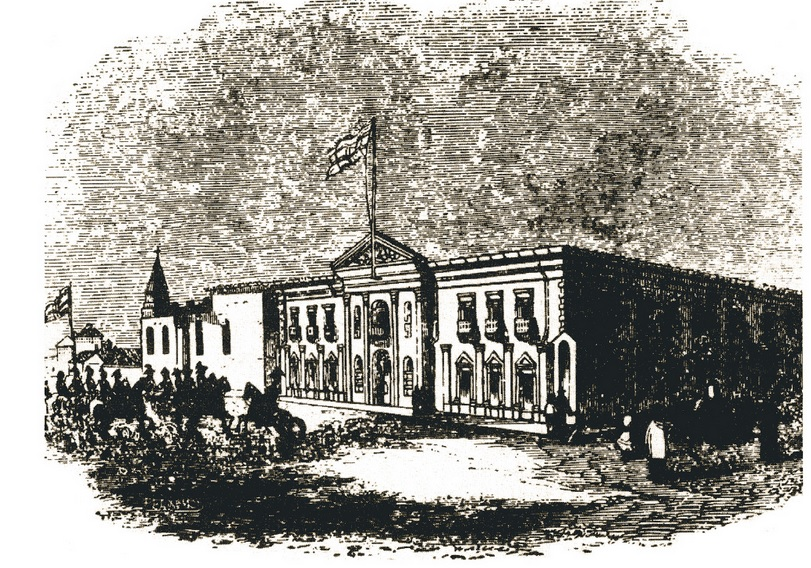
National Palace of Costa Rica (1850)

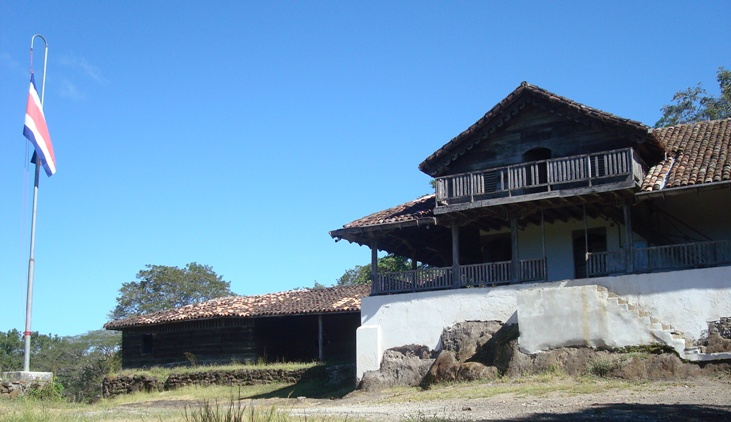
Hacienda Santa Rosa, site of the Battle of Santa Rosa (20 March 1856)

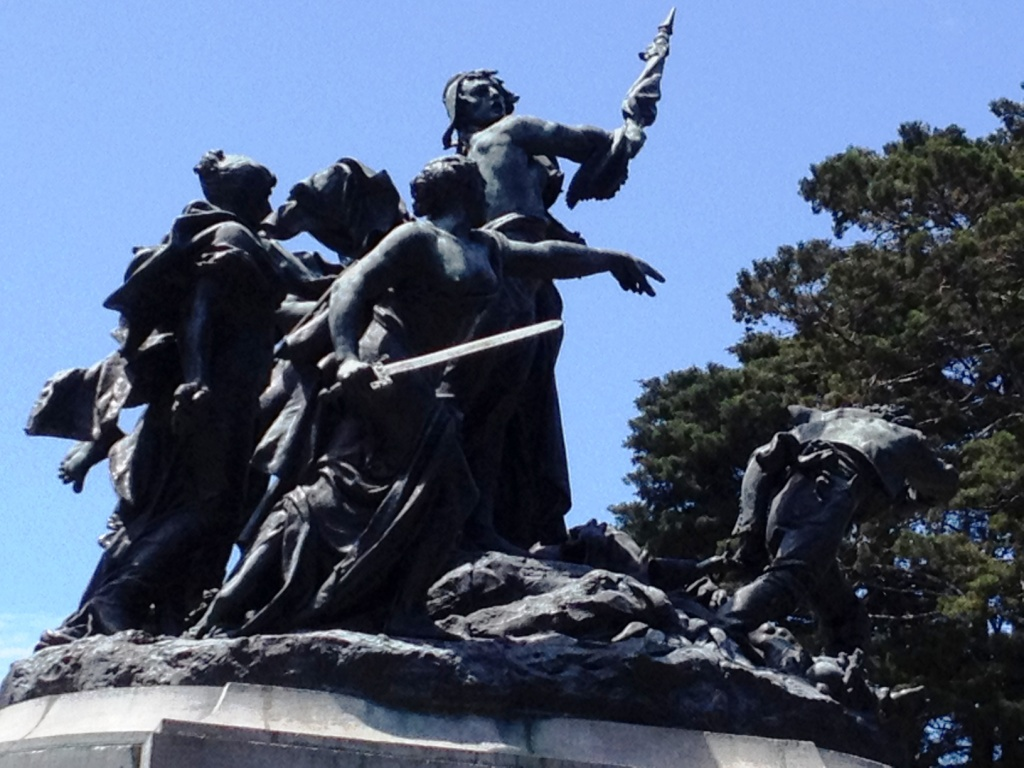
National Monument of Costa Rica, honoring the victory in the Filibuster War

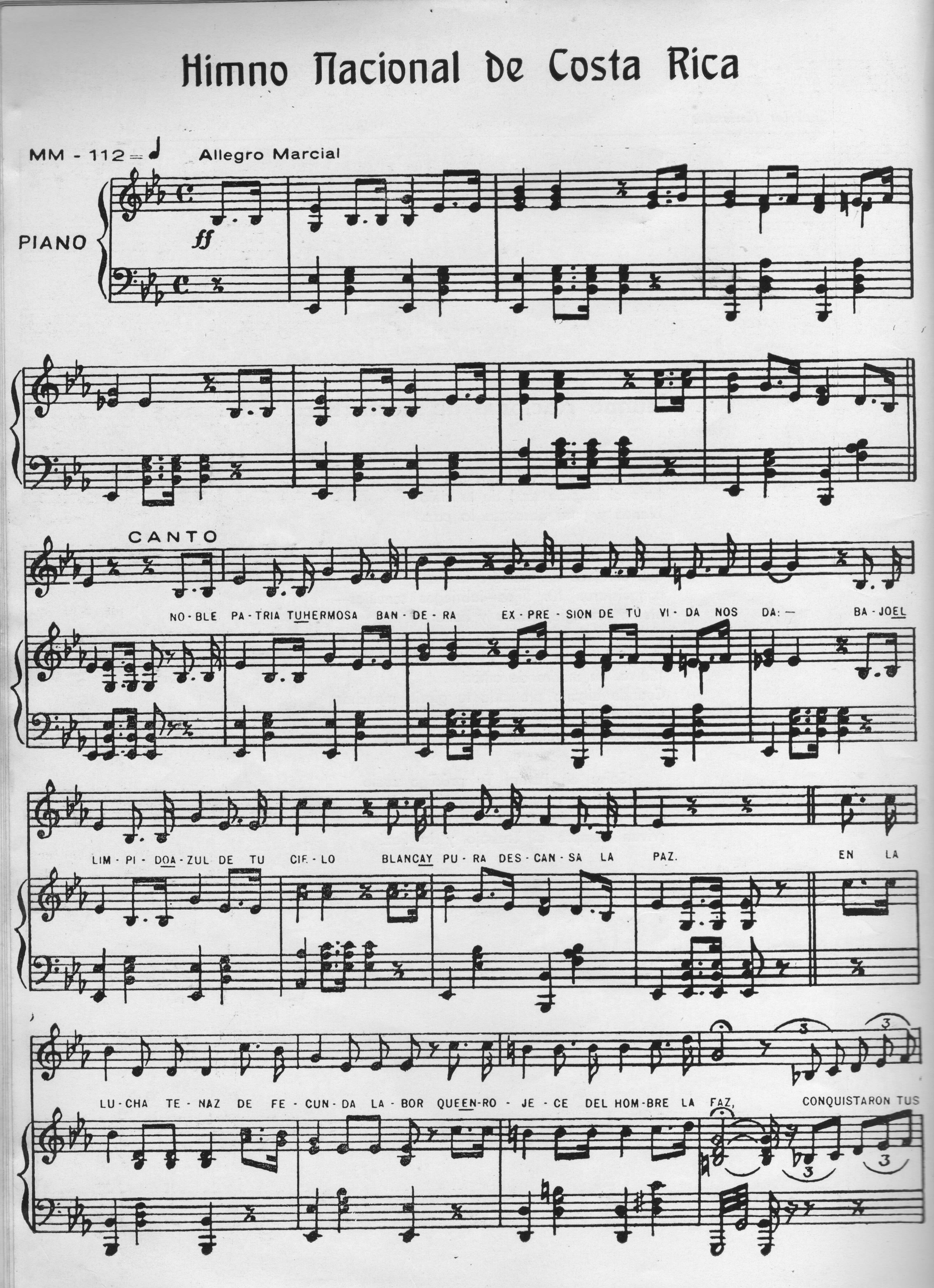
Sheet music of the National anthem of Costa Rica (1852)

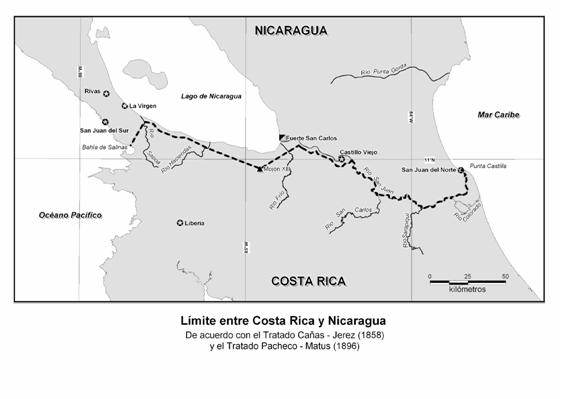
Border between Costa Rica and Nicaragua, established by the Cañas-Jerez Treaty (1858)

== Iconography and recognitions ==
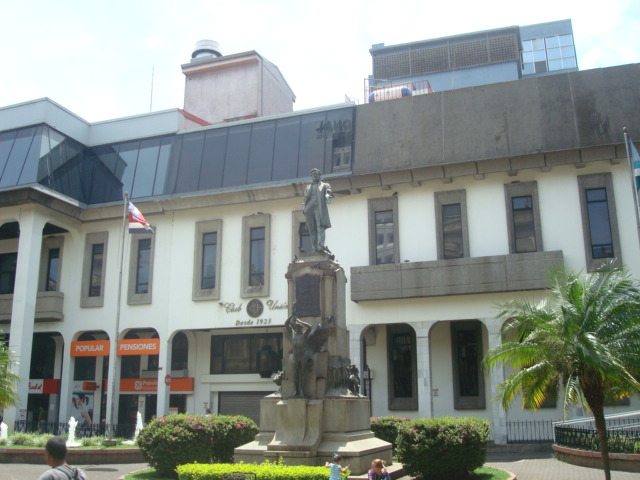
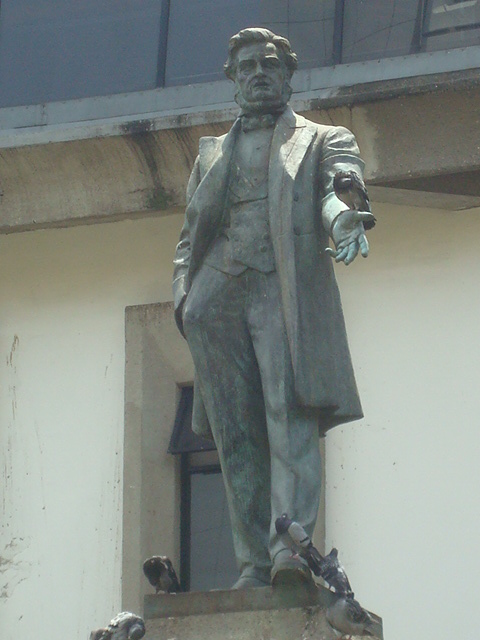
Monument to Juan Rafael Mora in San José, by Italian sculptor Pietro Piraino.

Streets and parks bear the name of Don Juanito. In Puntarenas, the Mora and Cañas Park was inaugurated in 1918, adorned with busts of both figures sculpted by Juan Rafael Chacón in 1960. The Second Avenue in San José was named in his honour, receiving the official title of "Avenida del Libertador Juan Rafael Mora" in 2014.

Mora has been portrayed by significant painters, starting with Aquiles Bigot, whose painting resides in the Pinacoteca of the Legislative Assembly. The Juan Santamaría Historical Cultural Museum in Alajuela houses an antique portrait by Tomás Povedano. In the Juan Santamaría Park, a large mural by Carlos Aguilar features Mora prominently. Gonzalo Morales Alvarado also painted the famous leader, as did his son Gonzalo Morales Sáurez (whose portrait hangs in the Hall of Latin American Patriots in the Casa Rosada, Argentina).

The main monument to Mora stands in the square in front of the Central Post Office in San José. Created by Italian sculptor Pietro Piraino, it features a 3-meter statue of the former president on a concrete base with bronze reliefs depicting Costa Rican agrarian labour and an episode from the National Campaign.

Mora is also one of the main characters in Óscar Núñez's historical novel La guerra prometida (2015).

Ancestors of Juan Rafael Mora Porras

16. Francisco de Mora y Martínez (1670-1742)
8. Camilo de Mora y Sánchez (1714-1767)
17. Clara Sánchez de Estrada (1685-1752)
4. Dionisio de Mora Valverde (b. 1730)
18. Sebastián Valverde Monterroso
9. Feliciana Valverde Villalobos (1714-1784)
19. Ana Josefa de Echavarría (Chavarría) e Ibarra
2. Camilo Mora Alvarado (1777-1836)
5. Antonia de la Luz Alvarado
22. Pedro de Alvarado y Jirón (d. 1739)
11. María Josefa de Alvarado y Guevara
23. Ángela de Guevara Sáenz (b. 1705)
1. Juan Rafael Mora Porras
24. Alonso de Porras y Sibaja
12. Juan Agustín de Porras (b. 1730)
25. Nicolasa González Alfaro (b. 1705)
6. Jesús Antonio de Porras y González de León (b. 1760)
26. Pedro González de León
13. Juana González de León (d. after 1788)
27. María Josefa Martínez de Gamboa
3. Ana Benita Porras Ulloa (1773-1833)
28. José de Vargas Ulloa (d. 1752)
14. José Antonio de Vargas Ulloa (b. 1706)
29. Isabel de Siles y Chaves
7. Josefa Ulloa Guzmán (1745-1797)
30. Francisco González de Villalobos y Guevara
15. Francisca González de Villalobos (b. 1726)
31. Josefa de Bonilla y Laya-Bolívar

== See also ==
- Filibuster War
- Presidents of Costa Rica
- William Walker (filibuster)

== Bibliography ==
- Vargas Araya, Armando (2007). El lado oculto del presidente Mora: resonancias de la Guerra Patria contra el filibusterismo de Estados Unidos (1850-1860) (1st ed.). San José, Costa Rica: Eduvisión. p. 432. ISBN 978-9968-521-96-3.

Political offices
Preceded by Miguel Mora Porras (Acting)	President of Costa Rica; 1849–1859	Succeeded by José Montealegre Fernández
