= José María Montealegre =

President of Costa Rica from 1859 to 1863

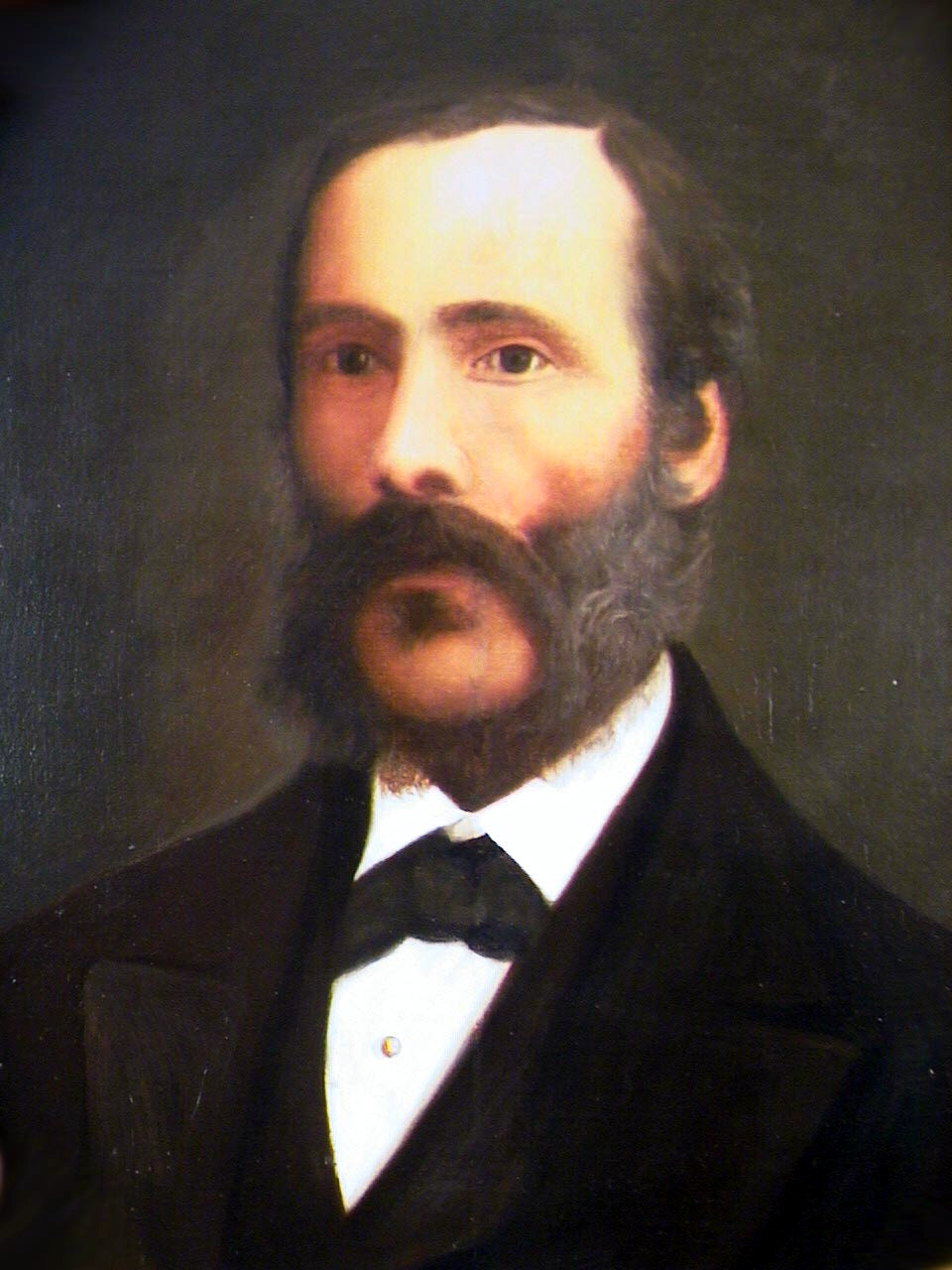
- Portrait by Aquiles Bigot

3rd President of Costa Rica
- In office 14 August 1859 – 8 May 1863
- Preceded by: Juan Rafael Mora Porras
- Succeeded by: Jesús Jiménez Zamora

Personal details
- Born: 19 March 1815 San José, Captaincy General of Guatemala, Spanish Empire
- Died: 26 September 1887 (aged 72) San Jose, California, US
- Party: Independent
- Spouses: Ana Maria Rosa Mora Porras (m. 1840; died 1854) Sofía Matilde Joy Redman (m. 1858)
- Parent(s): Mariano Montealegre Bustamante; Gerónima Fernández Chacón
- Relatives: Bruno Carranza (brother-in-law)
- Education: Marischal College (MBBS)
- Occupation: Physician; politician; businessman; landowner

José María Montealegre Fernández (19 March 1815 – 26 September 1887) was a Costa Rican medical doctor, businessman and politician who served as the 3rd President of Costa Rica from 1859 to 1863. He assumed the presidency following the overthrow of Juan Rafael Mora in 1859 and was subsequently elected under the Constitution of 1859. He was a member of the prominent Montealegre family.

== Early life and career ==
Montealegre was born on 19 March 1815 into a wealthy family of coffee plantation owners in Costa Rica. He was the eldest son of politician Mariano Montealegre Bustamante and Gerónima Fernández Chacón. His sister, Gerónima Montealegre Fernández, married Bruno Carranza Ramírez, who briefly served as provisional president of Costa Rica in 1870.

He received his early education in London before continuing his studies at Marischal College in Aberdeen, Scotland, together with his brother Mariano. Their younger brother, Francisco, later joined them there. After completing his humanities studies in 1835, Montealegre moved to Edinburgh, where he trained in surgery at private medical academies. He qualified as a surgeon through the Royal College of Surgeons in 1837, becoming the first Costa Rican known to have pursued medical studies in Europe.

After returning to Costa Rica, Montealegre practiced medicine while also managing coffee plantations, participating in the coffee export trade, and operating a pharmacy. He later became associated with the Anglo-Costa Rican Bank, founded in 1863. Montealegre was among the country's leading physicians during the mid-nineteenth century. He is credited with introducing the use of chloroform as an anesthetic in Costa Rica and served in San José during the cholera epidemic of 1856. He also served as president of the National Board of Physicians.

Montealegre married twice. His first marriage, in 1840, was to Ana María Mora (1819–1854), a sister of President Juan Rafael Mora. Following her death, he married Sofía Matilde Joy Redman (1823–1908), a native of London and a relative of British diplomat Sir William Gore Ouseley. His great-great-grandniece is American actress Madeleine Stowe.

== Presidency (1859-1863) ==
Montealegre came to power after the military coup that overthrew President Juan Rafael Mora (his former brother-in-law) on 14 August 1859. Shortly after assuming office, he convened a constitutional convention, which drafted the Constitution of 1859.

Under the new constitution, Montealegre was elected president through indirect suffrage in 1860 for a three-year term. His administration oversaw the implementation of the new constitutional framework, and at the conclusion of his term in 1863 he peacefully transferred power to his elected successor, Jesús Jiménez Zamora.

== Later life ==
Following the 1870 coup led by Tomás Guardia Gutiérrez, which deposed his brother-in-law Bruno Carranza, Montealegre left Costa Rica with his family. In 1872 they sailed aboard the Alaska to San Francisco, California. Montealegre died on 26 September 1887 in San Jose, California. He was initially buried near Mission San José, in what is now Fremont, California. His remains were repatriated to Costa Rica in 1978.

In 1968, Costa Rican historian Carlos Meléndez Chaverri published Dr. José María Montealegre, the first full-length biography devoted to his life.

Political offices
| Preceded by Juan Rafael Mora Porras | President of Costa Rica; 1859–1863 | Succeeded by Jesús Jiménez Zamora |
