= Guren (disambiguation) =

Guren (Japanese: 紅蓮, romanized: gùréń, lit. 'ぐれん, グレン', crimson lotus, crimson colour) is a Japanese word, which means "crimson-colored lotus" and is used in an artistic connotation.

Guren or Gurren, may also refer to:

== People and characters ==
- Guren (lay name: Tani), a Japanese nun who created the Korenya Shingetsuan rice cracker in 1327
- Miloslav Gureň (born 1976), Czech professional ice hockey defenceman
- Helga Guren, Czech actress who won Best Actress at the 58th Karlovy Vary International Film Festival 2024
- Peter Guren, cartoonist for the comic strip Ask Shagg (1980–2020)
- Muriel Guren, mother of U.S. businessman Alan M. Leventhal (born 1952)
- Gurren, a variant of the Irish surname McGovern (name)
- Gurren of Haag (German: Gurren von Haag) noble family, the Dark Ages predecessor to the Fraunberg German noble family; see List of states in the Holy Roman Empire (H)
- Lorenz Gurren (1608–1629), a widow executed for witchcraft at the Mergentheim witch trials in the Germanies; see Thomas Schreiber (innkeeper)

=== Fictional characters ===
- Guren, an anime-only character in the Naruto: Shippuden season 5 anime-only arc, the Three-Tails Arc.
- Guren, a fictional mecha from Code Geass
- Guren, a fictional character from Japanese manga Zenki
- Guren, a shikigami, a fictional character from the Japanese light novel series Shōnen Onmyōji
- Guren, a kitsune, a fictional character from the Japanese light novel series Redo of Healer
- Guren, a ninja, a fictional character from the 2000 videogame Ninja Assault
- Guren (紅蓮), a fictional character from the 2004 videogame Summon Night: Swordcraft Story 2
- Guren Ichinose (Seraph of the End character), a fictional character from Seraph of the End
- Guren Nash (Japanese: 大神 グレン, romanized: Ōgami Guren, lit. 'Guren Ougami'), a fictional character from Tenkai Knights
- Guren Soshigaya (Japanese: 祖師谷 紅蓮, romanized: Soshigaya Guren), a fictional character from the Japanese TV anime Gibiate
- G23 Gurren Dragotron (Japanese: グレンドラゴトロン), a fictional character from Transformers Go!
- Gren (Japanese: グレン, romanized: Guren), a fictional character from the Japanese OVA Iria: Zeiram the Animation
- Gren (Japanese: グ レ ン, romanized: Guren), a fictional character from Cowboy Bebop
- Gren Din (Japanese: グレン・ディン, romanized: Guren Din), a fictional character from the anime Last Hope (TV series)
- George Glenn (Japanese: ジョージ・グレン, romanized: Jōji Guren), a fictional character from Mobile Suit Gundam SEED Japanese TV anime
- Rufus Glenn (Japanese: ルーファス・グレン, romanized: Rūfasu Guren), a fictional character from the Japanese TV anime Mars Red
- Glen Donkervoort (Japanese: グレン・ドンカーブート, romanized: Guren Donkābūto), a fictional character from the Japanese light novel series and TV anime Chaika: The Coffin Princess
- Glen Eisenach (Japanese: グレン・アイゼナッハ, romanized: Guren Aizenahha), a fictional character from the Japanese light novel series Bibliophile Princess
- Glenn Gallia (Japanese: グレン・ガリア, romanized: Guren Garia), a fictional character from the Japanese light novel series I May Be a Guild Receptionist, But I'll Solo Any Boss to Clock Out on Time
- Glenn Litbeit (Japanese: グレン・リトバイト, romanized: Guren Ritobaito), a fictional character from the Japanese light novel series and TV anime Monster Girl Doctor
- Glenn Radars (Japanese: グレン レーダス, romanized: Guren Rēdasu), a fictional character from the Japanese light novel series Akashic Records of Bastard Magic Instructor
- Glenn (Japanese: グレン, romanized: Guren), a fictional character from the Japanese manga serial Übel Blatt

== Places ==
- Guren Graduate Institute, Ulaanbaatar, Mongolia
- Góry, Węgorzewo County, Warmian-Masurian Voivodeship, Poland; historically known as Gurren under German administration

=== Fictional locations ===
- Guren Town, a fictional location in Pokemon; see List of Pokémon volumes

== Literature ==
- Guren Ichinose: Catastrophe at Sixteen, a Japanese light novel series in the Seraph of the End animanga franchise
- Guren Ichinose: Resurrection at Nineteen, a Japanese light novel in the Seraph of the End animanga franchise
- Guren 5, a 2013 novel by Kazutaka Kodaka
- "Crimson Lotus" (Japanese: 紅蓮, romanized: Guren), chapter 28 of the Japanese manga serial comic Blue Exorcist; see List of Blue Exorcist chapters
- Guren: Ito Noizi Art Collection (Japanese: いとうのいぢ画集「紅蓮」), a 2006 artbook by Noizi Ito
- Guren (Japanese: 紅蓮), a 2005 artbook for the animanga franchise Shakugan no Shana

== Music ==
- "Guren" (song), a 2008 single by The Gazette
- "Guren" (Japanese: 紅蓮, lit. 'Crimson'), a 2014 song by Does (band) used as a themesong for Japanese TV anime Naruto: Shippuden; also released as a single

== Other uses ==
- Guren (videogame)『紅蓮』（ぐれん）, a 2002 videogame; see List of anime based on video games

== See also ==
- Frank McGuren OAM (1909–1990), Australian politician
- Colleen Maree McGurren, wife of Australian politician John Fahey (politician) (1945–2020)
- Melissa McGurren, U.S. broadcast personality for WTMX and WJOB (AM)
- Guren no Yumiya, a 2013 Linked Horizon song
- Guren Onna, a 2008 Japanese TV series
- Gurren Lagann, a 2007 Japanese mecha anime television series
- Crimson (disambiguation)
- Lotus (disambiguation)
- Glenn (disambiguation)
- Glen (disambiguation)
