= Glin =

Glin or GLIN may refer to:

- Global Legal Information Network, federation of government agencies that contribute national legal information
- Glin, County Limerick, village in Ireland
- Glin GAA Club, a team in West Limerick
- Knight of Glin, hereditary title held by the Fitzgeralds of Limerick
- Glin Castle, manor home in the village of Glin that was the seat of the Knight of Glin
- Great Lakes Information Network, an initiative of the Great Lakes Commission in the United States
- Glin the good fairy, character in Oz (1976 film)
- Glin, member of the Sweeper Alliance in the manga Black Cat
- Glin, a province in the science fiction novel A Time of Changes

== See also ==
- Desmond FitzGerald, 29th Knight of Glin (1937-2011), an Irish nobleman and president of the Irish Georgian Society
- Glen (disambiguation)
- Glenn (disambiguation)
- Glinn (disambiguation)
- Glyn (disambiguation)
- Glynn (disambiguation)
- Glynne (disambiguation)
