= Glen (disambiguation) =

A glen is a valley.

Glen may also refer to:

== People ==
- Glen (given name)
- Glen (surname)

== Places ==
- River Glen (disambiguation) or Glen River, in various countries

=== Ireland ===
- Glen, Ballyloughloe, a townland in Ballyloughloe civil parish, County Westmeath
- Glen, County Donegal, a village
- Glen, Rathgarve, a townland in Rathgarve civil parish, County Westmeath

=== Northern Ireland ===
- Glen, County Fermanagh, a townland
- Glens of Antrim, also known as "The Glens", a region comprising nine glens

=== United States ===
- Glen, Mississippi, a town
- Glen, Montana, a census-designated place
- Glen, Nebraska, an unincorporated community
- Glen, New Hampshire, an unincorporated village
- Glen, New York, a town

=== Elsewhere ===
- Glen Island, Nunavut, Canada
- Glen, Shimla, Himachal Pradesh, India, a forest
- Glen Water, Ayrshire, Scotland, a stream

== Other uses ==
- Glen (music company), Scottish music publisher and music instrument manufacturer
- NBR Glen Class, a class of steam locomotive on the North British Railway
- Glen Class, a Dublin Bay one-design dinghy
- Yokosuka E14Y, an Imperial Japanese Navy seaplane, codenamed "Glen" by United States forces
- Gay and Lesbian Equality Network, an Irish gay rights group

== See also ==
- The Glen (disambiguation)
- Glenn (disambiguation)
- Glin (disambiguation)
- Glinn (disambiguation)
- Glyn (disambiguation)
- Glynn (disambiguation)
- Glynne (disambiguation)
- Forest Glen, Chicago, Illinois, a community area of Chicago
