= McGluwa =

McGluwa is a surname. Notable people with the surname include:

- Harold McGluwa, South African politician
- Joe McGluwa (born 1963), South African politician

== See also ==
- McLuhan
- McLucas
- McLuckie
- McGlynn
