= Glen (given name) =

Glen is an English, masculine given name. Notable people with the name include:

- Glen Abbott (1969–1993), South African cricketer
- Glen Adam (born 1959), New Zealand footballer
- Glen Adams (1945–2010), Jamaican musician
- Glen Adams (cricketer) (born 1995), South African cricketer
- Glen Alyn (1913–1984), Australian actress
- Glen Amerson (1938–2020), American football player
- Glen Andrews (footballer) (born 1945), English footballer
- Glen Angus (1970–2007), Canadian artist
- Glen Ballard (born 1953), American songwriter, lyricist, and record producer
- Glen Barker (born 1971), American baseball player
- Glen Baxter (artist) (1944–2026), English artist
- Glen Baxter (journalist), Canadian journalist
- Glen E. Baxter (1930-1983), American mathematician
- Glen Bell (1923–2010), American businessman and restaurateur
- Glen Benton, American bass/vocals for Deicide, a death metal band
- Glen Berger, American scriptwriter
- Glen Bingham (1890–1966), American football and basketball coach
- Glen De Boeck (1971–2025), Belgian football player and manager
- Glen Bonner (1952–2017), American football player
- Glen Bortell (1914–2015), American politician
- Glen Bow (1935–2006), Australian rules footballer
- Glen Bowersock (born 1936), American historian
- Glen Everton Braden (1899–1967), Canadian politician
- Glen Brand (1923–2008), American wrestler
- Glen Bredon (1932–2000), American mathematician
- Glen E. Brown (born 1943), American politician
- Glen Bruk-Jackson (born 1969), Zimbabwean cricketer
- Glen Brumby (born 1960), Australian squash player
- Glen Bryan (born 1989), Canadian lacrosse player
- Glen Burtnik (born 1955), American singer, songwriter, entertainer and multi-instrumentalist
- Glen Buxton (1947–1997), American guitarist
- Glen Campbell (1936–2017), American singer-songwriter and actor
- Glen Carberry (1896–1976), American football player
- Glen Casada (born 1959), American politician
- Glen Cavaliero (1927–2019), English poet and critic
- Glen Cavender (1883–1962), American actor
- Glen Chadwick (born 1976), New Zealand cyclist
- Glen Christian, American football player
- Glen Clark (baseball) (1940–2018), American baseball player
- Glen Clegg (1933–2016), Canadian politician
- Glen Cochrane (1958–2024), Canadian ice hockey player
- Glen Coffee (born 1987), American football player
- Glen Cohen (born 1954), British sprinter
- Glen Collins (American football) (born 1959), American football player
- Glen Condren (born 1942), American football player
- Glen E. Conrad (1949–2021), American judge
- Glen Cook, American science fiction and fantasy author
- Glen Cook (baseball) (born 1959), American baseball player
- Glen Coulthard (born 1974), Canadian scholar
- Glen Cressman (1934–2019), Canadian ice hockey player
- Glen Culler (1927–2003), American engineer
- Glen Cummings (politician) (born 1944), Canadian politician
- Glen Currie (born 1958), Canadian ice hockey player
- Glen Dandridge (born 1985), American basketball player
- Glen H. Davidson (born 1941), American judge
- Glen Davies (politician) (1943–2003), Australian politician
- Glen Davis (basketball) (born 1986), American basketball player
- Glen Dawson (climber) (1912–2016), American mountain climber
- Glen Day (born 1965), American professional golfer
- Glen Despins (1964–2020), Canadian curler
- Glen Deweese (1932–2001), American politician and convenience store owner
- Glen Dickey, American politician
- Glen Drover, Canadian guitarist
- Glen Durrant (born 1970), English professional darts player
- Glen Eberle (born 1963), American biathlete
- Glen E. Friedman (born 1962), American photographer
- Glen Gauntt, American football player
- Glen Stewart Godwin (born 1958), American fugitive and convicted murderer
- Glen David Gold (born 1964), American novelist, memoirist and screenwriter
- Glen Gulutzan (born 1971), Canadian ice hockey coach and player
- Glen Hansard (1970–2026), Irish singer-songwriter
- Glen Helser (born 1970), American spree killer
- Glen Jackson (rugby union) (born 1975), New Zealand rugby union player
- Glen Jackson (Canadian football) (born 1954), Canadian football player
- Glen Jakovich (born 1973), Australian rules footballer
- Glen Jensen (born 1953), American actor and stand-up comedian
- Glen Jenvey (born 1965), British activist
- Glen Jobe Jr. (born 1951), American biathlete
- Glen Jobson (1930–2024), Australian field hockey player
- Glen Johnson (born 1984), English footballer
- Glen Johnson (boxer) (born 1969), Jamaican boxer
- Glen Johnson (soccer) (born 1951), Canadian soccer player
- Glen Johnson (footballer, born 1952), English footballer
- Glen D. Johnson (1911-1983), American lawyer and politician
- Glen D. Johnson Jr. (born 1954), American academic and politician
- Glen Johnston (1901–1991), Canadian politician
- Glen Jones (1910–1983), American law enforcement officer
- Glen Joseph (born 1984), English actor
- Glen Kamara (born 1995), Finnish footballer
- Glen Keane (born 1954), American animator, director, author and illustrator
- Glen Kidston (1899–1931), British aviator and racing driver
- Glen A. Larson (1937–2014), American television producer, writer, musician, and director
- Glen Matlock (born 1956), English musician
- Glen Mason (born 1950), American college football player and coach
- Glen Mason (singer) (1930–2014), Scottish-born singer
- Glen Mazzara (born 1967), American television producer and writer
- Glen Metropolit (born 1974), Canadian professional ice hockey player
- Glen Miller (basketball) (born 1963), head men's basketball coach at the University of Pennsylvania
- Glen Morgan (born 1961), American television producer, writer and director
- Glen Murakami, American animator, artist, character designer, director and producer
- Glen Payne (1926–1999), American gospel vocalist
- Glen Perkins (born 1983), American professional baseball player and television analyst
- Glen Phillips (singer) (born 1970), American songwriter, lyricist, singer and guitarist
- Glen Powell (born 1988), American actor
- Glen Rice Jr., American basketball player who also played internationally
- Glen Edward Rogers (born 1962), American convicted serial killer
- Glen Sather (born 1943), Canadian ice hockey player, coach, and executive
- Glen Saville, former Australian basketball player
- Glen Schofield, American video game artist, designer, director, and producer
- Glen Sobel (born 1970), American drummer
- Glen Steurer (born 1955), American racing driver
- Glen Taylor (born 1941), American billionaire business magnate and politician
- Glen H. Taylor (1904–1984), American politician, entertainer, and businessman
- Glen Templeton, American country singer and songwriter
- Glen D. VanHerck (born 1962), American retired United States Air Force general
- Glen Walker, American football player
- Glen Walshaw, Zimbabwean freestyle swimmer
- Glen Washington (born 1957), Jamaican singer-songwriter, drummer and record producer
- Glen Wesley (born 1968), Canadian-American ice hockey player
- Glen Weyl (born 1985), American economist
- Glen Morgan Williams (1920–2012), American judge

== See also ==
- Glen (disambiguation)
- Glen (surname)
- Glenn (name)
