= Glenn (name) =

- Pronunciation: /ˈɡlɛn/
- Gender: Male (rarely female)

Origin
- Meaning: Valley
- Region of origin: English, Irish

Other names
- Related names: Glen, Glyn

Glenn is a given name and surname of English and Irish origin.

== Name ==
The surname Glenn is derived from the Irish name gleann. In the 19th century, Glenn also became common as a given name in English speaking cultures.

In Sweden, Glenn is relatively common first name in the western parts of the country but especially Gothenburg, originally due to a large and influential population of emigrated Scotsmen, especially in the city's early centuries. The name was very prevalent in the local football team IFK Göteborg which in the early 1980s had no fewer than four players named Glenn, including Glenn Hysén and Glenn Strömberg.

== Given name ==
Glenn may refer to:

=== In music ===
- Glenn Branca (1948–2018), American avant-garde composer and guitarist.
- Glenn Danzig (born 1955), American rock musician
- Glenn Frey (1948–2016), American rock musician, founding member of The Eagles
- Glenn Gould (1932–1982), Canadian pianist
- Glenn Gregory (born 1958), English pop musician
- Glenn Hughes (born 1952), English rock musician
- Glenn Hughes (Village People) (1950–2001), musician known for his work with the Village People
- Glenn Medeiros (born 1970), American singer/songwriter
- Glenn Miller (1904–1944), American jazz musician
- Glenn Ong (born 1970), Singaporean DJ
- Glenn Schwartz (1940–2018), American musician, member of the band Pacific Gas & Electric
- Glenn Tilbrook (born 1957), British musician
- Glenn Tipton (born 1947), English rock musician
- Glenn Wallis (born 1958), American punk guitarist (Ruin)
- Glenn Wheatley (1948–2022), Australian musician, talent manager and tour promoter
- Glenn Yarbrough (1930–2016), American folk singer
- The Extra Glenns, American musical duo in the 1990s

=== In other fields ===
- Glenn Barnes, American politician
- Glenn Beck (born 1964), American talk-radio and television host
- Glenn Brummer (born 1954), American baseball player
- Glenn Close (born 1947), American actress
- Glenn Consor, American-Israeli NBA and NCAA basketball analyst, who played collegiate and pro basketball
- Glenn Corbett (1930–1993), American actor
- Glenn Cowan (1952–2004), American table tennis player
- Glenn Cox (1931–2012), American baseball player
- Glenn Dickson (born 1986), New Zealand rugby union player
- Glenn Eichler (born 1956), American comedy writer
- Glenn Flear (born 1959), British chess player
- Glenn Ford (1916–2006), American actor
- Glenn Glass (born 1940), American football player
- Glenn Greenwald (born 1967), American author and blogger
- Glenn Hagel (born 1949), Canadian politician
- Glenn Hall (1931–2026), Canadian ice hockey player
- Glenn Hoddle (born 1957), English footballer
- Glenn Howerton (born 1976), American actor, producer and screenwriter
- Glenn Hysén (born 1959), Swedish football player
- Glenn Jacobs (born 1967), American professional wrestler known as "Kane"
- Glenn Johnson (born 1984), English footballer
- Glenn E. Martin (born 1970), American advocate
- Glenn L. Martin (1886–1955), aviation pioneer
- Glenn Lazarus (born 1965), Australian footballer
- Glenn Loovens (born 1983), Dutch football player
- Glenn Love (born 1989), American football player
- Glenn McGrath (born 1970), Australian cricketer
- Glenn McQueen (1960–2002), Canadian animator
- Glenn Morshower (born 1959), American actor and inspirational speaker
- Glenn Muenkat (born 1999), Canadian soccer player
- Glenn Quinn (1970–2002), Irish actor
- Glenn Rubenstein (born 1976), American journalist
- Glenn Ross (born 1971), British strongman/powerlifter
- Glenn T. Seaborg (1912–1999), American chemist, Nobel Prize laureate
- Glenn Sears, American race car driver
- Glenn Shadix (1952–2010), American actor
- Glenn Sparkman, American baseball pitcher
- Glenn Stearns (born 1963), American businessman, founder of Stearns Lending
- Glenn Stewart (born 1984), Australian rugby player
- Glenn Strange (1899–1973), American actor
- Glenn Strömberg (born 1960), Swedish football player
- Glenn Styres (born 1964), Canadian racing driver
- Glenn E. Trowbridge (born 1943), American politician
- Glenn Turner (born 1947), New Zealand cricketer
- Glenn Whelan (born 1984), Irish footballer
- Glenn Withrow (born 1953), American actor
- Glenn Wise (1896–1991), American politician
- Glenn Young (1929–2013), American football player
- Glenn Youngkin (born 1966), Governor of Virginia

=== Fictional characters ===
- Glenn Donovan, in the British soap opera Hollyoaks
- Glenn Matthews, otherwise known as The Janitor from the TV series Scrubs
- Glenn Quagmire, from the animated American television sitcom Family Guy
- Glenn Rhee, in the comic The Walking Dead and the television series of the same name

== Surname ==
- Aaron Glenn (born 1972), American football cornerback
- Alex Glenn (born 1988), New Zealand Rugby League player
- Alice Glenn (1921–2011), former Irish Fine Gael politician
- Amber Glenn (born 1999), American figure skater
- Annie Glenn (1920–2020), wife of former astronaut and Senator John Glenn
- Brad Glenn (born 1987), American professional baseball outfielder
- Brianna Glenn (born 1980), American long jumper
- Cam Glenn (born 1996), American football player
- Cheryl Glenn (born 1951), American politician
- Cheryl Glenn (academic), scholar and teacher
- Christopher Glenn (1938–2006), American radio and television news journalist
- Cody Glenn (born 1986), American football linebacker
- Cordy Glenn (born 1989), American football offensive tackle
- Cornelia Deaderick Glenn (1854–1926), First Lady of North Carolina
- Darrell Glenn (1935–1990), American pop singer
- David Glenn (footballer) (born 1962), English professional footballer
- David Glenn (garden designer), plantsman
- David Glenn (pioneer) (1753–1820), Kentucky Frontiersman
- Devon Glenn, member of American rock band Buckcherry
- Diana Glenn (born 1974), Australian actress
- Ed Glenn (shortstop) (1875–1911), American professional baseball shortstop
- Ed Glenn (outfielder) (1860–1892), American professional baseball outfielder
- Eve Glenn, Australian artist, musician, and performer with Wimmins Circus and Toxic Shock
- Evelyn Nakano Glenn, professor of gender studies
- Freddie Glenn (born 1957), American spree killer and rapist
- Gary Glenn, American politician
- Gene W. Glenn (born 1928), American politician
- Glen Glenn (singer) (1934–2022), American rockabilly singer
- Glen Glenn (sound engineer) (1907–1960), American sound recorder
- Graham Glenn (born 1933), former senior Australian public servant
- Hugh J. Glenn (1824–1883), businessman and California politician
- J. Glenn, American drummer
- Jacoby Glenn (born 1993), American football cornerback
- Jason Glenn (born 1979), American football linebacker
- Jerome C. Glenn (born 1945), futurist
- Jim Glenn (born 1948), American politician
- Jimmy Glenn (born 1972), American soccer forward
- Joe Glenn (American football) (born 1949), American football coach
- Joe Glenn (baseball) (1908–1985), Major League catcher
- John Glenn (disambiguation), multiple people
  - John Glenn (1921–2016), American test pilot, astronaut, and senator
- Jonathan Glenn (born 1987), Trinidad and Tobago footballer
- Josh Glenn (born 1994), Australian professional footballer
- Joshua Glenn (born 1967), American writer and editor
- Kerry Glenn (born 1962), American professional football player
- Kevin Glenn (born 1979), Canadian Football League quarterback
- Kimiko Glenn (born 1989), American actress and singer
- Larry Glenn (born 1947), American politician
- Linda MacDonald Glenn, American bioethicist
- Lorri Neilsen Glenn, Canadian poet, ethnographer and essayist
- Luther Glenn (1818–1886), American lawyer, politician, and mayor
- Malcom Glenn (born 1987), American writer and political commentator
- Michael Allen "Mike" Glenn, American murder victim
- Michael Glenn (cricketer) (born 1956), English cricketer
- Mike Glenn (born 1955), American basketball player
- Oliver Edmunds Glenn (1878–?), American mathematician
- Otis F. Glenn (1879–1959), Republican United States Senator from the State of Illinois
- Owen Glenn (born 1940), New Zealand businessman and philanthropist
- Pierre-William Glenn (1943–2024), French cinematographer
- Ricardo Glenn (born 1990), American basketball player
- Rick Glenn (born 1989) is an American mixed martial artist
- Robert Broadnax Glenn (1854–1920), American politician and governor of North Carolina
- Rod Glenn, English author and actor
- Roy Glenn (1914–1971), American character actor
- Rudy Glenn (born 1958), American soccer player
- Ryan Glenn (born 1980), Canadian professional ice hockey defenceman
- Scott Glenn (born 1939), American actor
- Stanley Glenn (1926–2011), American baseball catcher
- Steven Glenn (born 1971), Canadian football linebacker
- Tarik Glenn (born 1976), American football offensive tackle
- Terry Glenn (1974–2017), American football wide receiver
- Thomas G. Glenn, Canadian opera singer
- Thomas L. Glenn (1847–1918), United States Representative from Idaho
- Tyler Glenn (born 1983), American singer, songwriter, and musician
- Tyree Glenn (1912–1979), American musician
- Vencie Glenn (born 1964), American football safety
- Wendy Glenn, English actress
- William Glenn (disambiguation), multiple people
  - William Glenn (1914–2003), American cardiac surgeon

=== Fictional characters ===
- George Glenn, fictional character from the anime series Mobile Suit Gundam SEED
- Marlena Glenn, maiden name of Queen Marlena, fictional character from the Masters of the Universe franchise

== See also ==
- Glen (given name)
- Glen (surname)
