= McGlynn =

McGlynn is an Irish surname. Notable persons with the name include:

- Aileen McGlynn (born 1973), Scottish paralympic tandem cyclist
- Arty McGlynn (1944–2019), Irish guitarist
- Ben McGlynn (born 1985), Australian rules football player playing for the Sydney Swans
- Dick McGlynn (born 1948), retired professional ice hockey player
- Edward McGlynn (1837–1900), American Roman Catholic priest and social reformer
- Frank McGlynn, Sr. (1866–1951), American film actor
- Gareth McGlynn (born 1982), midfielder for Derry City
- Gerard McGlynn, American retired soccer midfielder
- Ian McGlynn (born 1973), American singer-songwriter
- John McGlynn (actor), Scottish actor
- John McGlynn (Gaelic footballer), Kerry player
- John McGlynn (Scottish footballer), association football player and manager (Heart of Midlothian FC)
- John H. McGlynn, American editor/translator
- Joseph Leo McGlynn, Jr. (1925–1999), United States federal judge
- Karyna McGlynn (born 1977), American poet
- Katherine A. McGlynn, American cancer epidemiologist
- Katie McGlynn (born 1993), British actress
- Mary Elizabeth McGlynn (born 1966), American voice actress, ADR director, writer, and singer
- Michael McGlynn (born 1964), Irish composer
- Michael McGlynn (swimmer) (born 2000), South African marathon swimmer
- Michael J. McGlynn, mayor of Medford, Massachusetts
- Mike McGlynn (born 1985), American football center for the Philadelphia Eagles
- Molly McGlynn, Canadian film and television director and screenwriter
- Pat McGlynn (born 1958), rhythm guitarist for the Bay City Rollers
- Ryan McGlynn (born 1974), co-owner of McGlynn Racing
- Stoney McGlynn (1872–1941), professional baseball pitcher
- Vic McGlynn (born 1978), English radio presenter and disc jockey

== See also ==
- McGlinn
- McGluwa
- McLuhan
- McLucas
- McLuckie
