= John Glenn (disambiguation) =

John Glenn (1921–2016) was a United States astronaut and statesman.

John Glenn may also refer to:

== People ==
- John Glenn (judge) (1795–1853), Maryland attorney and federal judge
- John Glenn (Alberta) (1833–1886), early Alberta settler
- John Thomas Glenn (1845–1899), mayor of Atlanta from 1889 to 1891
- John Glenn (1870s outfielder) (1850–1888), outfielder and first baseman in Major League Baseball from 1871 to 1877
- John Lyles Glenn Jr. (1892–1938), United States federal judge
- John Glenn (1960s outfielder) (1928–2023), outfielder in Major League Baseball in 1960.
- John Glenn (screenwriter) (fl. 1999–2019), American director of The Lazarus Project

== Schools ==
- John Glenn Middle School of International Studies, a middle school in Indio, California
- John Glenn High School (disambiguation), multiple schools in the United States

== Other uses ==
- USNS John Glenn (T-ESD-2)
- Fireboat John H. Glenn Jr.
- S.S. John Glenn, an Orbital-ATK Cygnus space capsule used on mission Cygnus CRS OA-7

== See also ==
- John (disambiguation)
- Glenn (disambiguation)
- John Glen (disambiguation)
- John Glynne (disambiguation)
- Jonathan Glenn (born 1987), Trinidadian soccer player
