= T. rex and the Crater of Doom =

Science book by Walter Alvarez (published 1997)

- Special edition 2007 cover for T. rex and the Crater of Doom
- Author: Walter Alvarez
- Genre: Non-fiction, paleontology, geology, chemistry, physics
- Publisher: Princeton University Press
- Publication date: 1997
- Media type: Print (Hardcover & paperback)
- Pages: 208
- ISBN: 978-0-691-13103-0

T. rex and the Crater of Doom is a nonfiction book by UC Berkeley professor Walter Alvarez that was published by Princeton University Press in 1997. The book discusses the research and evidence that led to the creation of the Alvarez hypothesis, which explains how an impact event was the main cause that resulted in the Cretaceous–Paleogene extinction event.

== Content ==
The book begins by discussing Alvarez's research in the 1970s, before ever investigating the cause of the Cretaceous–Paleogene extinction event, when he was researching plate tectonics involving the Apennine Mountains with William "Bill" Lowrie. The method of this research was to use the evidence of the Earth's magnetic field to show that the plate upon which the rocks of the mountains rested had rotated over millions of years. While investigating limestone deposits in Gubbio, they discovered that some of the rocks were not aligned with the magnetic north pole, but in the opposite direction, implying the Earth undergoes geomagnetic reversal over time. This, with the plentiful fossilized material of extinct foraminifera, allowed them to date the time differences between each reversal and catalog the species of microscopic life found in each era. In doing so, they discovered that a certain time period had resulted in very few foraminifera fossils being formed, a boundary of little life now known as the Cretaceous–Paleogene boundary or the KT boundary. Just above this boundary, there was a thick layer that had no evidence of fossils at all, pointing to an almost complete extinction of microscopic sea life. This discovery was in direct opposition to the theory of gradualism, the leading belief of the period that evolutionary change occurred slowly across large time periods, rather than in bursts of short, distinct events, a theory known as catastrophism.

Suspecting that the layer without fossilized remains was evidence of a catastrophic event, Alvarez set out to determine how quickly the layer of clay had been deposited, which would either prove or disprove his hypothesis. His father, Luis Alvarez, suggested that the amount of iridium, an element deposited from cosmic dust at a fixed rate, might provide evidence for his claim. If the amount of iridium in the layer was higher than would be expected, that would imply an asteroid or comet impact had caused impactor dust to fall in high amounts all around the world, building up a higher concentration of iridium. The amount of iridium when tested was found to be 9 parts per billion (ppb), rather than the 0.1 ppb that would have accumulated naturally in the layer. The next step was to determine whether this high concentration of iridium was unique to Gubbio or whether it could be found worldwide, as would be expected for a catastrophic impact event. While locations with clear rock layers of the KT boundary were rare, Alvarez was able to confirm his findings with the Stevns Klint deposits in Zealand.

Alvarez's hypothesis at the time conflicted over whether an impact was the cause or whether the iridium had been deposited by a supernova from a nearby star, which could have also killed most life on Earth due to gamma ray bursts and cosmic radiation. In order to confirm or rule out this alternative hypothesis, Alvarez worked with Frank Asaro and Helen Michel to determine if the clay layer also contained plutonium-244, a distinctive isotope that a supernova would also have deposited if it had been the cause. While their initial testing came out as positive for the isotope, it turned out to be a false positive under further scrutiny and testing. This caused Alvarez to abandon the supernova possibility and focus singularly on an impact event being the cause. However, Alvarez was uncertain on how such an impact could have wiped out species all around the world. After investigating the effects of the 1883 eruption of Krakatoa, he determined that a large enough impact could force enough ash and dust into the atmosphere to block out the sun, leading to a global mass extinction.

By 1980, evidence of the KT boundary and high iridium levels had been independently reported on at dozens of other sites, moving Alvarez's hypothesis toward a global hunt for the impact crater, in competition with several other scientists such as Jan Smit. Many teams continued to dispute the impact hypothesis, instead theorizing that a volcanic eruption could have been the cause of the mass extinction. An eruption in an area known as the Deccan Traps was dated to the same time period of the boundary, making the eruption hypothesis stronger. The search for an impact crater caused Alvarez to turn to evidence of a tsunami, which a large impact would have likely caused if it had occurred in the middle of the ocean. By the late 1980s, he found evidence at the Brazos River that a tsunami has swept across the Gulf of Mexico millions of years earlier. The discovery was made thanks to a graduate student named Alan Hildebrand that notified Alvarez of the evidence of a crater on the Yucatan Peninsula, which had never been published in the scientific literature by the Mexican petroleum geologists that had found it. The age of the crater needed to be determined if it was going to be a candidate for the KT boundary impact, but access to the region was limited due to the crater having been buried over time and the core samples obtained by the geologists having been lost. The only option Alvarez had left was to find undisturbed sediment left over from the impact still on the surface rock layer somewhere in northeastern Mexico. After several weeks of searching, his team found evidence in a riverbed named Arroyo el Mimbral with the exact signature of the impact that was expected. Several years later, in 1991, the core samples were re-discovered and confirmed the findings from Alvarez's expedition.

== Style and tone ==
Rich in metaphor and analogy, the language of this book, uncommon to scientists, constitutes exceptional science writing that sweeps the reader into the page. Alvarez writes the way he lectures – with verve, charm, and conciseness. He understands, as Voltaire maintained, that the adjective should be treated as the natural enemy of the noun. Clearly, such a narrative can grow only from intimate understanding of the complex and varied scientific material that, for Alvarez, has fostered poetic, lucid simplification without simplism.

— William Glen, Isis, March 1998, pg. 165.

In a review for Geological Magazine, Simon Conway Morris noted that the controversy and debate over the impact hypothesis had led to comments against it that are "querulous, petulant, otiose, and sometimes simply poisonous", but that Alvarez's book "acknowledges the differences that have arisen, but never does he descend to insult and injury", leading to a "gracious and generous book". Timothy Ferris, writing for The New York Times, stated that Alvarez "gets the facts across in a lighthearted, almost playful manner", but still manages to present "solid science" that presents a "clear and efficient exposition that conveys plenty of cogent detail while keeping an eye on the subtle interplay of thought, action and personality that makes scientific research such arresting human behavior."

== Critical reception ==
Clark R. Chapman, writing for Nature, stated that Alvarez's "slim" book can be read "in a single sitting and I recommend it highly – if only as a jumping-off point to other perspectives on this dramatic scientific revolution." In a review for Scientific American of T. rex and the Crater of Doom and the opposing theories presented in The Great Dinosaur Extinction Controversy, Michael Benton advocated reading the book "for an excellent account of the pro-impact position and for insight into how scientists pose questions and seek to resolve them by sometimes roundabout means". For The Quarterly Review of Biology, paleontologist Mark Norell reviewed the book, criticizing it for not presenting more connective evidence between the impact and the saurian extinction event, stating, "the evidence marshaled by Alvarez is conclusive. Just over 65 million years ago an impact happened. But is this responsible for "the crime"? The jury is still out." William Glen, in the journal Isis, explained how the book presented in "simple, compelling language a fascinating autobiographical chronicle of cutting-edge scientific research that includes much not yet known to history" and that it was "indispensable for anyone interested in the science, the history, or life in science." Los Angeles Times writer Dave A. Russell said that the book was "very well written and so engrossing that a reader with little or no background in the earth's geologic history will enjoy an easy and vastly entertaining summary of how we came to our present understanding of the past." Douglas Palmer in New Scientist described the historical story as a reading similar to "Arthurian legend, full of temptations which lead the hero astray and distract him and his followers from the true path" and that "this personal account of the search for a geological Excalibur makes fascinating reading."
