= River Glen =

Glen River or River Glen may refer to:

- Glen River (Chaudière River tributary), Quebec, Canada
- River Glen, Lincolnshire, England
- River Glen, Northumberland, England
- Glen River, County Donegal, Ireland
- Glen River, County Down, Northern Ireland

== See also ==
- Glen Water, Ayrshire, Scotland, a stream
- Glen (disambiguation)
