= Glen (surname) =

Glen is a surname. Notable people with the surname include:

- Abigail Glen (born 2001), English cricketer
- Alec Glen, Scottish footballer
- Alex Glen (1878–1916), Scottish footballer
- Archie Glen (1929–1998), Scottish international football player
- Cornell Glen (born 1980), Trinidadian international football (soccer) player
- Davie Glen (1881–1917), Scottish footballer
- Gary Glen (born 1990), Scottish football player
- Georgie Glen, Scottish actress
- Iain Glen (born 1961), Scottish actor
- James Allison Glen (1877–1950), Canadian politician
- James Alpheus Glen (1890–1962), Canadian flying ace
- John Glen (director) (born 1932), English film director and editor
- John Glen (mayor of Atlanta) (1809–1895), mayor of Atlanta
- John Glen (politician) (born 1974), UK Conservative politician
- Marla Glen (born 1960), American jazz singer
- Robert Glen (1875–?), Scottish international football player
- Sandy Glen (1912–2004), Scottish explorer
- William Glen (geologist) (1932–2025), American geologist and historian
- William Glen (poet) (1789–1826), Scottish poet

== See also ==
- Glen (disambiguation)
- Glen (given name)
- Glenn (name)
