= Glynne =

Glynne may refer to one of the following.

- Glynne baronets
- Stephen Glynne (disambiguation)
- William Glynne (disambiguation)
- Jess Glynne
- John Glynne (disambiguation)
- Mary Glynne

== See also ==
- Glinn (disambiguation)
- Glynn (disambiguation)
- Glyn (disambiguation)
