= McLynn =

McLynn is a surname. Notable people with the surname include:

- Frank McLynn (born 1941), British writer, historian and journalist
- Pauline McLynn (born 1962), Irish actor, comedian and writer

== See also ==
- McGlynn
