= Glinn =

Glinn may refer to:

- Burt Glinn (1925-2008), Magnum photographer
- Lillian Glinn (1902–1978), American classic female blues and country blues singer and songwriter
- Glinn (Star Trek), Cardassian officer rank title

== See also ==
- Gael Linn, Irish language organisation
- Glin (disambiguation)
- Glyn (disambiguation)
- Glynn (disambiguation)
- Glynne (disambiguation)
- Glenn (disambiguation)
- McGlinn
