= McGlinn =

McGlinn is a surname. Notable people with the surname include:

- John McGlinn (1953–2009), American conductor and musical theatre archivist
- John Patrick McGlinn (1869–1946), Australian public servant and senior army officer

== See also ==
- McGlynn
- Glinn (disambiguation)
