= Lac de l'Orignal =

Lake in Estrie, Quebec (Canada)

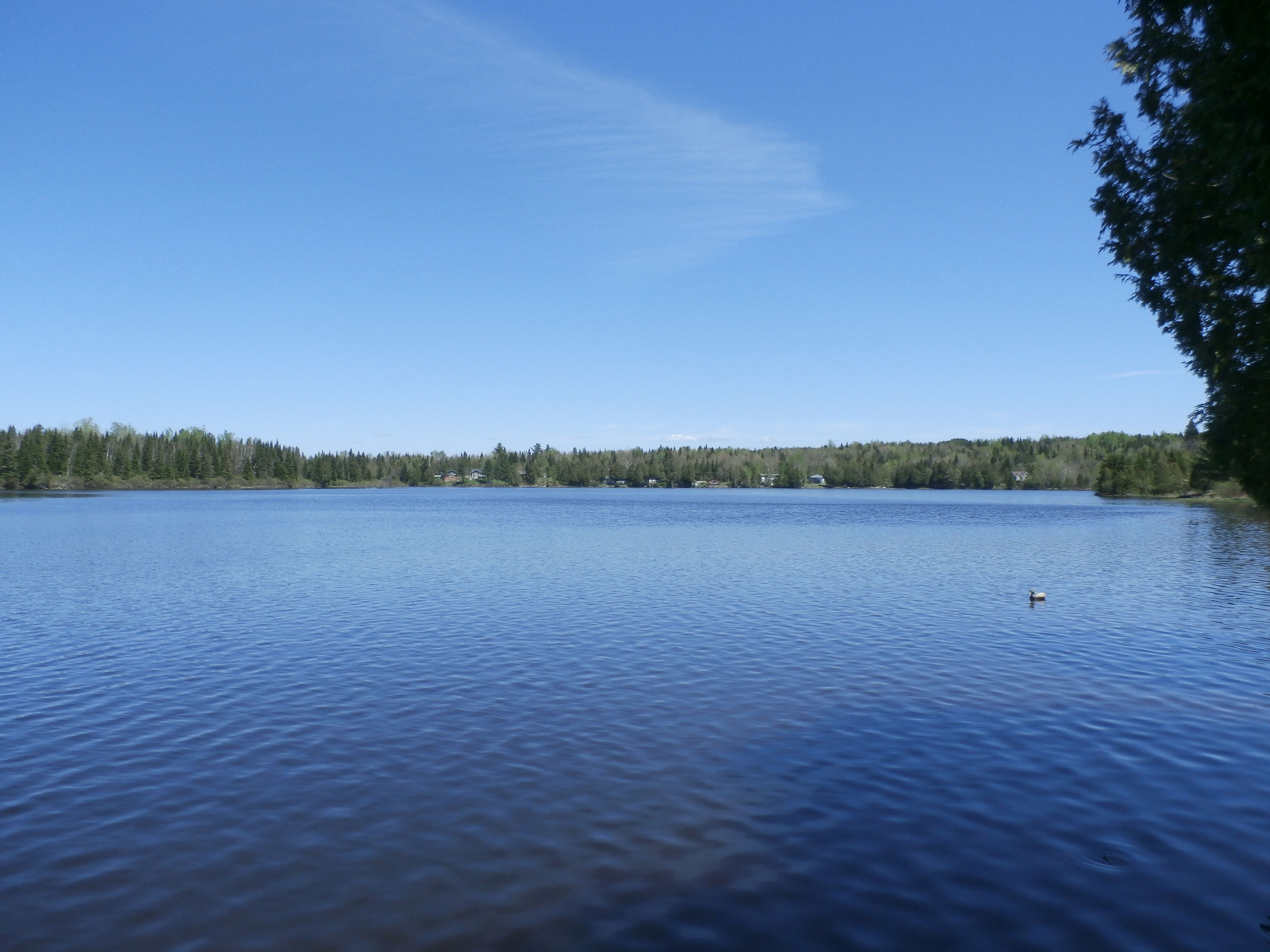
- View of Lac de l'Orignal.

- Location within Quebec
- Location: Le Granit Regional County Municipality, Estrie, Quebec, Canada
- Coordinates: 45.610833°N 70.90984°W
- Primary inflows: Glen River
- Primary outflows: Glen River
- Max. length: 0.65 kilometres (0.40 mi)
- Max. width: 0.3 kilometres (0.19 mi)
- Surface elevation: 427 metres (1,401 ft)

The Lac de l'Orignal (in English: Moose Lake) is a lake located on the territory of the village of Nantes, near Lac-Mégantic in Estrie, in Quebec, in Canada. The lake is crossed by the Glen River which joins the Chaudière River and is a sub-tributary of the St. Lawrence River.

== Geography ==
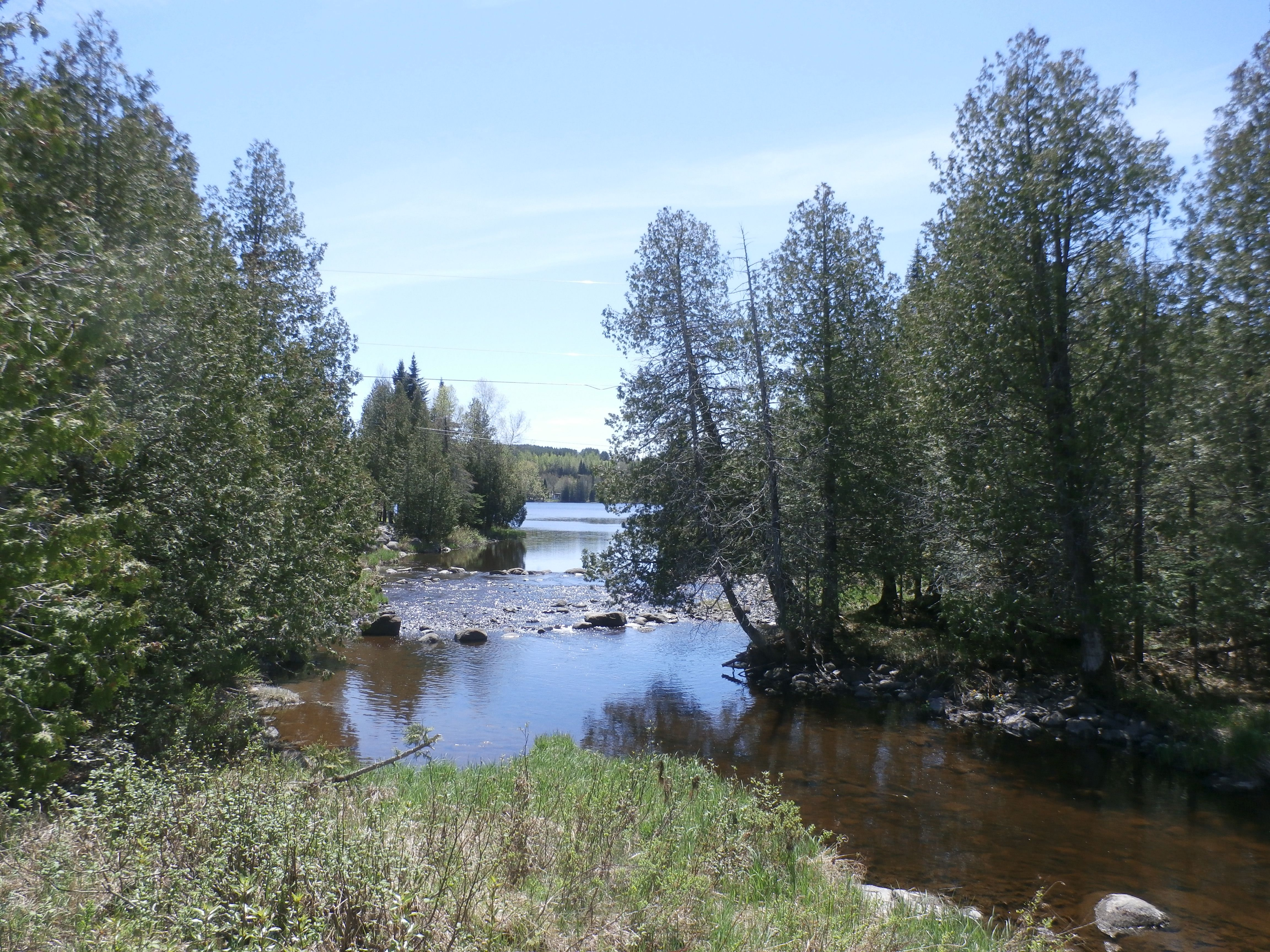
Lac de l'Orignal and its outlet, the Glen River.

Its maximum approximate depth is 5.5 metres (18 ft), its width is 300 metres (980 ft) and its length is 650 metres (2,130 ft). Its area is 45 acres. The Lake is accessible by rang 10 which joins the "Chemin du Lac de L'Orignal" and runs along part of the lake. Most of the land is private and inhabited. The lake is adjacent to a marsh to the west, which is crossed by the Glen River.
