= William Glen =

William Glen or Glenn may refer to:

- William Glen (geologist) (1932–2025), American geologist and historian of science
- William Glen (poet) (1789–1826), Scottish poet
- William Glen (footballer) (1903–1981), Irish football player
- William Glenn (1914–2003), American cardiac surgeon
- William E. Glenn (1926–2013), American inventor
- William H. Glenn (1872–1940), American industrialist
- Billy Glenn (William Spiers Glenn, 1877–1953), New Zealand politician
