= The Glen =

The Glen may refer to:

== Places ==
- The Glen, Queensland, Australia, a locality in the Southern Downs Region
- The Glen, Ontario, Canada, a community
- The Glen, Cork Munster Province, Ireland, a residential area of Cork
- The Glen, New Zealand, a suburb of Dunedin, South Island
- The Glen, Scottish Borders, an estate and country house in Scotland
- The Glen, Western Isles, a location in Scotland
- The Glen, New York, a place in Warren County, New York, United States
- The Glen, San Antonio, an African-American neighborhood in Texas, United States
- The Glen, a development in Glenview, Illinois, United States

== Other ==
- "The Glen" (Bradley Joseph song), a 1998 composition
- The Glen, nickname for Watkins Glen International, an auto racetrack at Seneca Lake, New York, United States
- The Glen, an area in the 2014 Video Game OneShot and its 2016/2020 remakes.
- The Glen, an area in Night City in the video game Cyberpunk 2077

== See also ==
- The Glen Nature Reserve, in the Hunter Region, New South Wales, Australia
- The Glen Shopping Centre, in Glen Waverley, Victoria, Australia
- Glens of Antrim, also known as "The Glens", a region comprising nine glens
- Glen (disambiguation)
