= Luhan (disambiguation) =

Lu Han (born 1990) is a Chinese singer and actor.

Luhan may also refer to:

- Luhan (river), Ukraine
- Mabel Dodge Luhan, née Ganson (1879–1962), American patron of the arts
- Petru Luhan (born 1977), Romanian politician

== See also ==
- Mabel Dodge Luhan House, also known as Big House and St. Teresa House, Mabel Dodge Luhan's home in Taos, New Mexico, United States
- Lu Han (disambiguation)
- Luján (disambiguation)
- McLuhan, a surname
