= William Glynne =

William Glynne may refer to:

- William Glynne (MP) (1566–1620), MP for Anglesey, 1593
- Sir William Glynne, 1st Baronet (1638–1690), MP for Carnarvon, 1660
- Sir William Glynne, 2nd Baronet (1663–1721), MP for Oxford University, 1698–1700, and Woodstock, 1702–1705
- Sir William Glynne, 5th Baronet (c. 1710–1730)
- William Glynne Charles Gladstone (1885–1915), Liberal Party politician
- William Glyn (bishop) (1504–1558), bishop of Bangor
- William Glynne (priest), Welsh Anglican priest

== See also ==
- Glynne baronets
