= Lu Han (disambiguation) =

Lu Han (鹿晗, born 1990) is a Chinese singer and actor.

Lu Han may also refer to:

- Lu Han (Tang dynasty) (盧翰, 8th century), Tang dynasty chancellor
- Lu Han (Qing dynasty), 17th-18th centuries painter
- Lu Han (general) (盧漢, 1895–1974), Kuomintang general

== See also ==
- Liu Han
- Luhan (disambiguation)
