= Law Library of Congress =

Law library of the United States Congress

Coordinates: 38°53′12″N 77°00′18″W

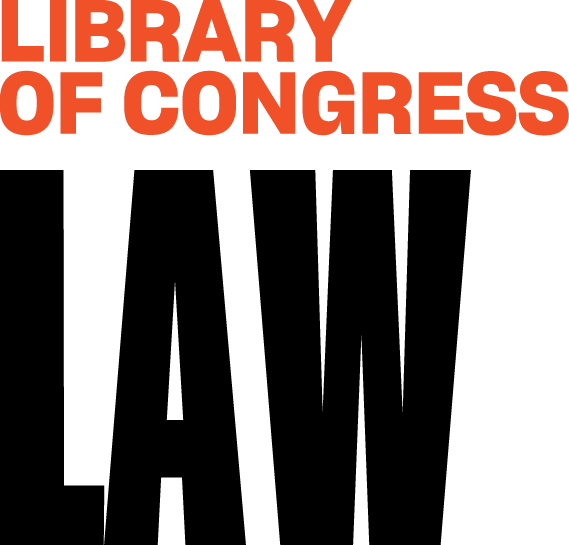
- Location: Washington, D.C., United States
- Type: National Law Library
- Established: 1832
- Reference to legal mandate: 2 U.S.C. § 132
- Branch of: Library of Congress

Collection
- Size: 2.9 million

Access and use
- Access requirements: Public access; Closed stacks
- Circulation: Library does not publicly circulate
- Population served: Members of the United States Congress and general public

Other information
- Budget: $15,797,000
- Director: Law Librarian of Congress Aslihan Bulut
- Employees: 91
- Website: www.law.gov

The Law Library of Congress is the law library of the United States Congress. The Law Library of Congress holds the single most comprehensive and authoritative collection of domestic, foreign, and international legal materials in the world. Established in 1832, its collections are currently housed in the James Madison Memorial Building of the Library of Congress. Law staff rely on and utilize 2.9 million volumes of primary legal sources, 102.18 million microforms, 99,000 reels of microfilm, 3.18 million pieces of microfiche, and 15,600 tangible electronic resources (CD-ROMs and other disks), making it the largest law library in the world.

== Mission statement ==
The mission of the Law Library of Congress is to provide authoritative legal research, reference and instruction services, and access to an unrivaled collection of U.S., foreign, comparative, and international law.

== History ==
=== Early years ===
The Library of Congress was established as an in-house reference library for Congress in 1800, the year the government moved from Philadelphia to the new city of Washington, D.C. Law books made up nearly 20% of the initial collection. These were for the most part publications in English and international law.

The first Library of Congress was destroyed when the British burned the Capitol Building in 1814. It was replaced by the purchase of the library of Thomas Jefferson in 1815. This brought 475 law titles, 318 of which were published in England. It included Virginia laws and court decisions, but material from other states (which Jefferson had classified as "foreign law") remained limited. Although the Library received copies of all federal laws and Supreme Court decisions, obtaining state laws and decisions of state courts remained a problem for decades.

=== The Supreme Court ===
There were repeated efforts to extend the use of what was generally called "The Congress Library" to other government officials and especially to the federal judiciary. The United States Supreme Court sat in the United States Capitol Building from 1801 to 1935. For the first decade of the nineteenth century its Justices could not formally use the Library of Congress, although they may have been able to consult the books with a letter of introduction from a Member of Congress. On March 2, 1812, a Joint Resolution of both Houses of Congresses authorized use of the Library by the justices of the Supreme Court, on whose behalf Chief Justice John Marshall (served 1801–1835) wrote a polite letter thanking Congress for the favor.

=== Establishment of the Law Library in 1832 ===
The first three decades of the nineteenth century saw repeated unsuccessful attempts to establish a separate Law Library to serve both Congress and the Supreme Court. The initiative came from those members of Congress who had had distinguished legal or judicial careers. On January 20, 1832, New York Senator William L. Marcy, a sometime Associate Judge of the Supreme Court of New York, introduced a bill to "Increase and Improve the Law Department of the Library of Congress". This time, the Bill passed both Houses of Congress and was signed by President Andrew Jackson on July 14, 1832. (The Statute remains in force, now listed as 2 U.S.C. § 132, § 134, § 135, and § 137.)

The Act directed the Librarian to prepare an "apartment" for the purpose of a law library and to remove the law books from the library into the apartment. The Justices of the Supreme Court were authorized to make rules and regulations for the use of the Law Library during the sitting of the court. The Law Library, however, remained a part of the Library of Congress which was responsible for its incidental expenses.

A sum of $5,000 was appropriated "for the present year" to purchase law books, with $1,000 for each of the next five years. The books would be selected by the Chief Justice. Some 2,011 law books (693 of which had belonged to Thomas Jefferson) were transferred from the general collection, and became the nucleus of a collection that now exceeds 2 million volumes. The Law Library thus acquired its own appropriation and budget line, as well as a statutory relationship with the Supreme Court that would endure until 1935.

=== Providing legal information to Congress and the Supreme Court ===
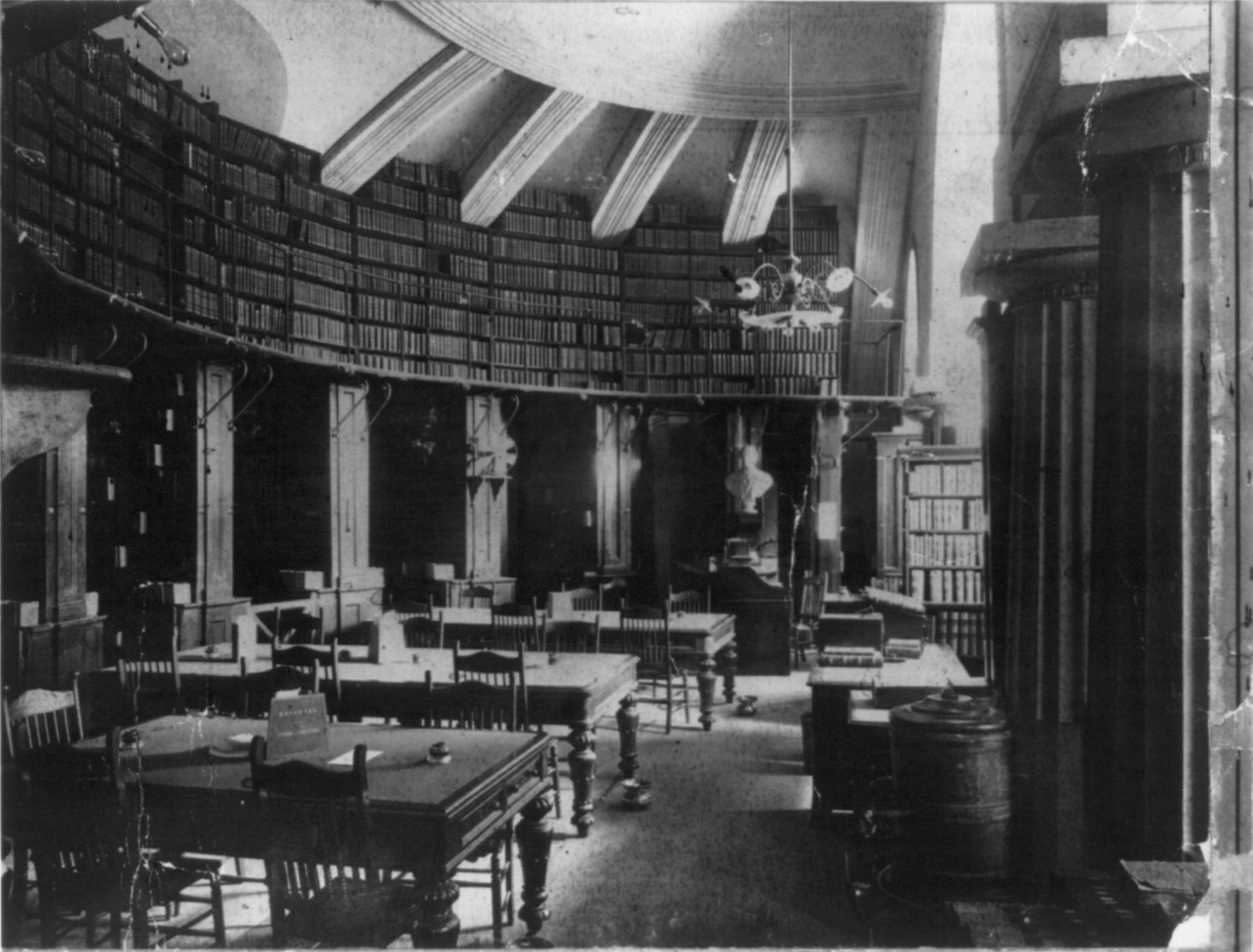
Law Library from in the former Supreme Court Chamber

From 1860 to 1897, the Law Library was housed in the former Supreme Court Chamber in the Capitol Building. A spiral staircase connected this with the Court in the room above, and the Custodian of Law (the early title of the official later called the Law Librarian, the first of whom would be Charles Henry Wharton Meehan) climbed the stair to deliver materials requested by the Justices. The rules of the Law Library, set down by the Chief Justice, permitted the Justices of the Supreme Court, Members of Congress, and some "gentlemen of the bar having a case on the docket" to sign out up to three books from the collection. The Custodian of Law helped patrons to find the law by physically locating a book and putting it in their hands. A special collection of major texts and court decisions was reserved for the exclusive use of the Justices.

The acquisition of the Louisiana Territory (1803) and of Florida (1819), which brought property and inheritance systems based on French and Spanish law, provided some incentive for the acquisition of books from the civil law tradition. The first systematic effort to collect foreign law came in 1848 soon after the conclusion of the Mexican War, when Congress directed the Library to obtain all available laws of Mexico. In the second half of the nineteenth century, collections of laws of the major European nations were added.

=== Public service circa 1898 ===
Although the Library of Congress was founded and funded to serve Congress, from the earliest years there was pressure to make its collections available to the public as well as to government officials. By the end of the nineteenth century, members of the public were free to consult the collections, although only Members of Congress and a few other officials could borrow books. The Law Library had a few tables, which were usually occupied by students from local law schools.

The Law Librarian's Annual Report for 1898 described a room "about 50 feet square. This cockpit, dim-lighted and inconvenient, ... is expected to accommodate the justices, lawyers engaged in cases, the members of the bar in search of light, as well as law students." Service was limited by crowding, short hours, and a small staff who were obligated to serve Congress and the Supreme Court before anyone else. A law reading room with a limited collection was set up in the newly opened Library of Congress Building in 1897, and eventually the entire collection and staff moved to less crowded quarters in the new building.

=== Expansion ===
The 20th century saw a major expansion of the scope of all Law Library activities. Reference service to the public benefited from a larger and, equally important, a well-catalogued collection. In the first decade of the 20th century the Law Library began a program of publication of authoritative reference works on the laws of the United States and of major foreign nations. After the early 1900s the Law Library was led by a series of Law Librarians with high professional qualifications and previous experience in the practice of law, the foreign service, or academic law schools. They oversaw what became a major on-going program of legal indexing, first for the laws of the United States and then for those of foreign nations.

In 1899 the law collection consisted of 103,000 volumes (including 15,000 duplicates), of which about 10,000 were in foreign languages. By 1950, 150,000 of 750,000 volumes were in foreign languages. The major acquisition of foreign language material came after the Second World War, and reflected the great increase in the absolute number of jurisdictions in the world, the changing position of the United States in world affairs and the deliberate policy of attempting to collect legal material from all jurisdictions.

The 1909 publication of the index to the United States federal statutes, which immediately became a standard reference work for law libraries, marked the beginning of the Law Library's transition from a purely local reference library to a major center for legal research. Law Librarian Dr. Edwin Borchard began the production of bibliographic guides to the law of foreign countries with the 1912 publication of a guide to the law of Germany, followed in 1913 by his own Bibliography of International Law and Continental Law. For the next several decades major publications on the laws of Spain, France, the larger Latin American countries, Eastern Europe and East Asia were produced, usually with support from various foundations or government agencies. Initially the work was done by temporary staff or outside experts, but after the mid-1930s the Law Library gradually began adding permanent staff whose primary qualifications were in foreign rather than United States law.

The permanent staff of the Law Library grew from 5 in 1901 to 6 in 1910, stayed at 7 from 1911 through 1921, and numbered 10 in 1924. Their numbers were augmented by sets of temporary workers employed on specific projects and funded either by grants from foundations or by one-time Congressional appropriations. By 1946 the total had increased to 30, and the Law Library requested 30 additional positions to relieve the overburdened staff.

Funding from outside bodies supported the expansion of the Law Library's foreign research capabilities after the Second World War. From 1949 to 1960 the National Committee for a Free Europe supported a staff of 12 lawyers from Eastern European and Baltic countries then under Communist rule. In 1951 the Department of State began a Far Eastern Law Project, under which refugee scholars from China collected and translated legal material from the newly established People's Republic of China.

By the 1950s the Law Library responded to the manifold problems of trying to find, much less interpret, foreign legal information by striving to, whenever possible, employ individuals trained in the law of the country in question and able to provide authoritative answers in English. The staff of foreign-trained attorneys has, over the years since the late 1940s, included former judges, private practitioners, diplomats and legislative drafters. In fact, the foreign attorneys play a significant role in developing the collection, selecting the most relevant texts and serials for the jurisdictions they cover.

By 1960 the pattern of a Reading Room providing reference service in United States federal and state law and a foreign legal research and reference wing staffed by specialists with expertise in the laws of particular foreign countries was set.

=== Move to Madison Building ===
In 1981, the library's collections were moved across Independence Avenue to the sub-basement of the recently constructed James Madison Memorial Building. Moving the library's 1.6 million volumes took four months, and a new reading room opened in April 1981 on the second floor of the Madison building. The new stacks occupied 81,000 square feet, totaling 59.5 linear miles of mobile shelving.

By 2002, the Madison building stacks were full, and additional materials were sent to the Library of Congress' High Density Storage Facility in Fort Meade, Maryland.

=== Institutional differentiation ===
After about 1900, as the volume of acquisitions and the percentage of foreign language materials both increased and the workload of the Supreme Court also increased, the Justices played a diminishing role in the selection of books for the Law Library. The move of the Supreme Court to its own building in 1935, and the establishment of a separate Supreme Court Library of American and British law brought the close institutional relations between the Law Library and the Court to an end. The Law Library continues to support the Supreme Court's needs for information on foreign and international law.

Congress established the Legislative Reference Service (the organizational ancestor of the present Congressional Research Service) in 1914, but for its first decade the LRS was headed by the Law Librarian and much of its work consisted of legal indexing, for both American and foreign law, and responses to Congressional requests about American, International and foreign law.

By the late 1920s the division of labor that endures to the present was established. The RS (later CRS) contains an American Law Section (now Division) working exclusively for Congress and depending on the collection maintained by the Law Library. The Law Library operates the Reading Room, provides reference service in U.S. law to Congress on a priority basis, and is responsible for all reference and research service in foreign, comparative and international law.

=== Indexing foreign law ===
Indexes and other finding aids are indispensable tools for legal research, but the laws of many countries are not well-indexed or available in authoritative or up-to-date codes or collections. The first major project of the Law Library was the 1907–1910 preparation of an index to United States federal statutes, an endeavor funded by a special Congressional appropriation. In 1902 the Librarian of Congress, Herbert Putnam, proposed a comprehensive index to current legislation from all the countries of the world. He noted that "If accompanied by a reference to preceding statutes or by brief abstracts ... it may become an instrument of the highest value not merely to the theoretic investigator, but to the practical legislator". Although there were far fewer sovereign countries in 1902 than today, Congress's practical legislators refused to fund so ambitious a project. The idea did not die though, and various guides to the legislation of foreign countries were produced as funding permitted.

Legislative indexing was a major activity of the Legislative Reference Service during its first ten years (1916–1924), and the staff of the Law library began keeping a card index to Latin American laws in the late 1920s. This was eventually published as the Index to Latin American Legislation in a two volume set in 1961, with two supplements - in 1973 and 1978 - covering the years from 1961 through 1975. The indexing of Latin American legislation continued, being adapted to existing information-processing technology as it developed from the 1970s through the 1990s.

By the 1990s, indexes and guides to the laws of many developed nations had become available, often on a commercial basis, as electronic files accessible through the Internet. Although not usually available to the general public, the Law Library's legal specialists used these for their research. But, control of a rapidly expanding body of legal information from a growing number of jurisdictions remained a major challenge to legal researchers. One institutional solution arrived at was an international, cooperative network that makes indexes, abstracts and the complete text of new laws available over the Internet. This product, which is now inactive, was the Global Legal Information Network (GLIN), and was coordinated by the Law Library of Congress. The Library's foreign law efforts are via its Directorate of Legal Research, which has a staff of foreign-trained lawyers from around the world along with research specialists.

=== Notable reports issued ===
In August 2009, the Law Library of Congress issued a controversial and disputed legal opinion report titled Honduras: Constitutional Law Issues. The report was originally commissioned by Congressman Aaron Schock (R., Ill.), prepared by Senior Foreign Law Specialist Norma Gutiérrez, and published by the Law Library of Congress. It features a legal analysis of the 2009 Honduran constitutional crisis with a specific examination of the legality of President Manuel Zelaya's 28 June 2009 removal from office and expatriation.

== Sources ==
- About the Law Library of Congress
- In Custodia Legis: Law Librarians of Congress
- Jane Sánchez Named Law Librarian of Congress (02/01/2017)
- Aslihan Bulut appointed Law Librarian of Congress (08/12/2021)

== Bibliography of Reports ==
- A Selective Annotated Bibliography of Directorate of Legal Research Multinational Reports, 2001-2004 provided by the Law Library of Congress

== Foreign Law Resources ==
- World Law Bulletin (a monthly publication of the Directorate of Legal Research, through March 2006)
- Global Legal Monitor archive (monthly issues, May 2006-July 2008)
- Global Legal Monitor searchable database (daily updates, November 2007 – present)
- Comprehensive Index of Legal Reports
