= John Glen =

John Glen may refer to:

- John Glen (1744–1799), mayor of Savannah
- John Glen (director) (born 1932), English film director and editor
- John Glen (mayor of Atlanta) (1809–1895), mayor of Atlanta
- John Glen (politician) (born 1974), UK Conservative politician
- John B. Glen, Scottish veterinarian

== See also ==
- John Glenn (disambiguation)
