= Glen Joseph =

English actor (born 1984)

- Born: Glen Robinson; 2 November 1984 (age 41); Newcastle-Upon-Tyne, England

Comedy career
- Years active: 2008 – present
- Medium: Actor
- Website: Official website

Glen Robinson (born 2 November 1984 in Newcastle-Upon-Tyne, England) is an English actor, director, musician, and broadcaster.

== Career ==
Joseph trained at the Guildford School of Acting, graduating with first class honours in 2007. He won the Sir John Gielgud Award for Musical Theatre in 2008.

Joseph spent the majority of his Acting career touring the World playing the titular role of Buddy Holly in Buddy – The Buddy Holly Story. as well as playing the role in the revival of the show in London’s West End.

== Wrestling ==
Joseph was one of three owners of PROGRESS Wrestling, a professional wrestling company based in London. He was also the lead commentator for the company, and Executive Producer. The company was formed by Jim Smallman and Jon Briley in March 2012, with Joseph joining them in May of that year. In 2020, Joseph and co-owner Smallman stepped away from the company to focus on their expanding roles at WWE .

Joseph works for WWE as a producer and as part of the European Talent Development team for their NXT UK brand.

== Music ==
In 2014 Joseph released his debut EP, Under Nashville Skies, which reached the top ten of the iTunes country music chart upon its release.

== Filmography ==
=== Theater ===
Year	Title	Role	Notes
2008-17	Buddy – The Buddy Holly Story	Buddy Holly	
2008	Footloose	Chuck Cranston	
2010-12	Dreamboats and Petticoats	Eric	
2015	To Sleep	Director	
2016	Dick Whittington	Director	

=== Film ===
Year	Title	Role	Notes
2009	Goal III: Taking on the World		
