= Luján =

Luján or Luxan, a common Spanish surname and given name, may refer to:

== People ==
=== Politics ===
- The Lujan political family of New Mexico:
  - Eugene D. Lujan (1887–1980), justice of the New Mexico Supreme Court
  - Manuel Lujan Sr., former Republican Mayor of Santa Fe
  - Manuel Lujan Jr. (1928–2019), former Republican U.S. Secretary of the Interior and Representative from New Mexico; son of Manuel Sr.
  - Ben Luján, former Democratic Speaker of the New Mexico House of Representatives; nephew of Manuel Jr.
  - Ben Ray Luján, Democratic U.S. Senator from New Mexico; son of Ben
  - Michelle Lujan Grisham, Democratic Governor of New Mexico; distantly related to the above
- John Lujan, former Republican member of the Texas House of Representatives
- Gabriel Silva Luján, Colombian diplomat
- Pilar C. Lujan, Guamanian politician

=== Sport ===
- Andrés Iniesta Luján, footballer for FC Barcelona and the Spain national football team
- Micaela Luján, Argentine professional boxer
- Sebastian Andres Lujan, Argentine professional boxer
- Walter Samuel (born Walter Adrián Luján, 1978), Argentine footballer

=== Other fields ===
- Luján Fernández, Argentine supermodel
- Daniela Luján, Mexican actress
- Fernando Luján, Mexican actor

== Places ==
- Luján, Buenos Aires, the head city in the district with the same name in Buenos Aires province, Argentina
- Luján de Cuyo, the head city and district in Mendoza province, Argentina
- Luján Partido, the district in Buenos Aires province, Argentina
- Luján River, in Buenos Aires Province, Argentina

== Religion ==
- Our Lady of Luján, a title of the Virgin Mary in Argentina
- Basilica of Our Lady of Luján, a Roman Catholic shrine in Luján, Buenos Aires Province, Argentina
- Cathedral Basilica of Mercedes-Luján, a Roman Catholic cathedral in Mercedes, Buenos Aires Province, Argentina
- Cathedral of Our Lady of Luján, Río Gallegos, a Roman Catholic cathedral in Río Gallegos, Santa Cruz Province, Argentina
- Chapel of the Miracle of Our Lady of Luján, a pilgrimage site in Zelaya, Buenos Aires Province, Argentina
- Chapel of Our Lady of Sorrows of Luján Pérez, a side chapel in the Cathedral of Santa Ana, Canary Islands, Spain

== Other uses ==
- Lujan v. Defenders of Wildlife, a United States Supreme Court case
- Club Luján, an Argentine football club
- Asociación Atlética Luján de Cuyo, an Argentine football team

== See also ==
- Luhan (disambiguation)
