= Glyn =

Glyn [ˈɡlɪn] means "Valley" in Welsh and may refer to:

- Glyn (name), including a list of people with the name
- Baron Glyn, a title in the Peerage of the United Kingdom
- Glyn baronets, created for members of the Glyn family
- Glyn Ceiriog, a former slate mining village in Wrexham County Borough, in Wales
- Glyn Technology School, an English boys' school in Epsom and Ewell
- Glyn Valley Tramway, a narrow gauge railway between Chirk and Glyn Ceiriog in Denbighshire, Wales
- Mynydd y Glyn, a mountain in South Wales, between the towns of Pontypridd and Tonyrefail
- An electoral ward in the community of Llanelli Rural in Carmarthenshire, Wales
- An electoral ward in the community of Colwyn Bay in Conwy, Wales

== See also ==
- Glynn (disambiguation)
- Glynne (disambiguation)
- Glinn (disambiguation)
- Glenn (disambiguation)
