= William Glynne (priest) =

Priest

William Glynne was a Welsh Anglican priest in the 16th century.

Glynne was educated at the University of Oxford. He held livings at Ysceifiog, Llandinam, Clynnog Fawr and Llanfwrog. Gwynn was Archdeacon of Anglesey from 1524 until his death in 1557.
