= Glen Abbott =

South African cricketer (1969–1993)

Personal information
- Full name: Glen Charles Abbott
- Born: 2 December 1969; Kimberley, Northern Cape, South Africa
- Died: 8 May 1993 (aged 23); Kimberley, Northern Cape, South Africa
- Batting: Left-handed
- Bowling: Left-arm medium

Domestic team information
- Years: Team
- 1988–1992: Griqualand West
- 1990–1992: Impalas
- 1992–1993: Northern Transvaal
- First-class debut: 2 December 1988 Griqualand West v Transvaal B
- Last First-class: 9 January 1993 Northern Transvaal v Eastern Province
- List A debut: 6 March 1990 Impalas v Western Province
- Last List A: 19 March 1993 Northern Transvaal v Impalas

Career statistics
| Competition | First-class | List A |
|---|---|---|
| Matches | 20 | 29 |
| Runs scored | 1,223 | 604 |
| Batting average | 38.21 | 30.20 |
| 100s/50s | 3/5 | 0/2 |
| Top score | 127 | 68* |
| Balls bowled | 89 | – |
| Wickets | 2 | – |
| Bowling average | 36.50 | – |
| 5 wickets in innings | 0 | – |
| 10 wickets in match | 0 | – |
| Best bowling | 2/0 | – |
| Catches/stumpings | 12/0 | 8/0 |
- Source: ESPNcricinfo, 22 March 2020

Glen Charles Abbott (2 December 1969 – 8 May 1993) was a South African cricketer, who played for Griqualand West and Northern Tranvaal. He previously played for the Tshwane University of Technology cricket club.

Abbott made his first-class debut for Griqualand West in the Castle Bowl competition in December 1988. He played a further 13 matches over three seasons with Griqualand West in the Bowl. In 1992, he moved to Northern Transvaal and played three matches in the Castle Cup.

In List A, Abbott played for the Impalas in the Benson and Hedges Series from 1990 to 1992 before playing his final season the competition with Northern Transvaal. He also played in four Nissan Shield matches, a now defunct knockout competition for South Africa's provincial teams.

During the 1992 English cricket season, Abbott played six matches for Worcestershire Second XI in the Second XI Championship.

Abbott died in a road incident near Kimberley on 8 May 1993 aged 23. He was about to play for Penn Cricket Club in Wolverhampton that season just before he died. A charity cricket tournament was played in his honour for many years after his death in Coventry. Abbott had played for the now folded Sphinx club in the Coventry and District League.
