= Glen Baxter (journalist) =

Canadian journalist

Glen Baxter is a Canadian television journalist. He hosted CTV's In Fashion and reported for FashionTelevisionChannel.

== Early life ==
He was raised in Montreal. Baxter moved to Toronto to study journalism at Ryerson University, where he graduated with a bachelor's degree in applied arts.

== Career ==
Baxter began his career in television with a brief stint as a producer at YTV as a student. While at YTV, he worked as an arts and entertainment on-camera reporter for French CBC (Société Radio-Canada) on the station’s weekly show Survolt. In 1991, Glen received a call from Moses Znaimer and landed a job at MuchMusic as an on-air reporter for FAX (now MuchNews). He made the jump to entertainment as a reporter for Citytv's CityPulse in Toronto. In 2001, Baxter became host of In Fashion and a reporter for FashionTelevisionChannel, where he reports on fashion, design and photography.

He reports on-site at Toronto Fashion Week, and Montréal Fashion Week each year.

== Projects ==
Baxter's photographs from Asia, Africa and the Middle East were displayed in four solo exhibitions. He raised more than $50,000 for Right To Play from his annual exhibits and auctions. He spent time visiting the charity’s programs in Benin and Ethiopia, where he met with volunteers and children who benefit from the organization's work.

Baxter volunteered for the Canadian Foundation for AIDS Research (CANFAR) as a junior committee member for five years, where he helped organize and attended the foundation's 8-Ball and Red Party, which raised close to half a million dollars for HIV/HIV/AIDS research.

Baxter was a guest speaker and regular host for John Ralston Saul's Le Francais Pour L'Avenir (French for the Future), where he encouraged high school students to speak and learn French and shared his thoughts on bilingualism.

In March 2009, he became Honorary Chair of SNAP!09, an annual photographic fundraiser held in Toronto that benefits the AIDS Committee of Toronto (ACT).

In September 2009, Baxter emceed The Best of Canada Interior Design Awards in Toronto. In October of the same year, Glen moderated FASHION//NEXT: The Annual Forum for Toronto’s Next Generation of Fashion Industry Professionals.

On June 11, 2009, he hosted the Canadian Centre for Architecture’s annual event in Montreal, attended by Quebec Premier Jean Charest and Montreal Mayor Gérald Tremblay.

He appeared in the Toronto Star’s Top 10 Best Dressed Men in Canada and earned a style award from The Globe and Mail in 1996.
