= To Sleep =

Poem by William Wordsworth

"To Sleep" is a poem by William Wordsworth. Here, the speaker is someone who suffers from insomnia. He lies sleepless all night, wanting to be able to sleep, but he cannot. He imagines a flock of sheep leisurely passing by, one after one. He tries imagining the sound of rain, the murmur of bees, the fall of rivers, winds and seas, smooth fields, calm waters and clear sky. He has thought of every pleasant things, but nothing helps. He sadly, helplessly thinks that he shall soon hear small birds' cries from his orchard trees. He has not been able to win sleep by any means, and he is quite exhausted. Without sleep, all of days wealth seems useless. Night is the blessed barrier between day and day, as it brings with it sleep: the mother of fresh thoughts and joyous health.the author rightfully emphasis the need of sleep in a man's daily life
