= List of Seraph of the End chapters =

Seraph of the End (Japanese: 終わりのセラフ, Hepburn: Owari no Serafu) is a dark fantasy manga series written by Takaya Kagami and illustrated by Yamato Yamamoto. It has been serialized by Shueisha in its Japanese monthly shōnen manga magazine, Jump SQ, since September 3, 2012. The series is set in a world where a virus has ravaged the global populace, leaving only children under the age of thirteen untouched; in its wake, vampires and other strange creatures appear from beneath the earth. A young man, Yuichiro "Yu" Hyakuya, sets out to kill the vampires after one slaughters almost all the members from his orphanage.

The series has been collected in tankōbon format from January 4, 2013, and as of May 1, 2026, thirty-six volumes have been collected, as well as one additional. The 11th volume will include an original video animation. On October 7, 2013, Viz Media announced that it had added the series to its manga lineup on the company's Weekly Shonen Jump digital magazine for North American release. A voice comic (vomic) was also produced and published by Shueisha and its first episode was featured on Sakiyomi Jum-Bang! on February 1, 2013.

A spin-off gag manga to commemorate the anime adaptation titled Serapuchi!〜Seraph of the End 4-koma〜 (せらぷち!〜終わりのセラフ4コマ編〜, Serapuchi!〜 Owari no Serafu 4-koma-hen 〜) has been serialized by Shueisha in Jump SQ from April 2015 to January 2016, following initial publication in the 17th and 18th volumes of Jump SQ.19. It also has been published on the Seraph of the End official website.

As of September 2022, the series has 15 million copies (all manga and light novels) in circulation.

== Seraph of the End: Vampire Reign ==
No.	Original release date	Original ISBN	English release date	English ISBN
1	January 4, 2013	978-4-08-870705-1	June 3, 2014	978-1-42-157150-8
1. "The World of Blood Legacy" (血脈のセカイ, Kechimyaku no Sekai); 2. "Humanity After the Fall" (破滅後のニンゲン, Hametsu-go no Ningen); 3. "The Demon in Your Heart" (心に棲むオニ, Kokoro ni Sumu Oni)
Official Japanese: An unknown virus destroyed humanity, sparing all children and vampires dominated underground cities. Yūichirō Hyakuya, a orphaned boy, escapes there alone after losing his friends, and meets Guren Ichinose. Official English: After trumpets of the apocalypse proclaim the fall of humanity, vampires arise from the shadows to rule the earth. Yūichirō vows revenge by killing vampires. His dream became near-impossible, given that vampires are seven times stronger than humans, and the only way to kill them is by using Cursed Gear, advanced demon-possessed weaponry. The humanity's most elite Vampire Extermination Unit, the Moon Demon Company, wants nothing to do with Yūichirō unless he works in a team, which is the last thing he wants.
2	May 2, 2013	978-4-08-870673-3	September 2, 2014	978-1-42-157151-5
4. "The Worst Pair" (不倶戴天の敵, Fugutaiten no Teki); 5. "Vampire Mikaela" (ミカエラ吸血鬼, Mikaera Kyūketsuki); 6. "Black Asura" (漆黒のアシュラ, Shikkoku no Ashura); 7. "New Family" (新しいカゾク, Atarashii Kazoku)
Official Japanese: Yūichirō becomes a trainee of the "Moon Demon Company" group. However, Shiho Kimizuki appears in the class. The two fight for the higher rank demon curse equipment. Meanwhile, Mikaela is revived by Krul Tepes. Official English: Yūichirō earns his place in the Japanese Imperial Demon Army, he prepares to undergo a test to acquire the most powerful and deadly of humanity's weapons against vampires: Black Demon Series Cursed Gear. Meanwhile, the vampire nobility recruits Mika, he believes Yūichirō left him four years ago.
3	September 4, 2013	978-4-08-870814-0	December 2, 2014	978-1-42-157152-2
8. "Mitsuba's Squad" (三葉のチーム, Mitsuba no Chīmu); 9. "First Extermination" (殲滅のハジマリ, Senmetsu no Hajimari); 10. "Vampire Attack" (襲撃のヴァンパイヤ, Shūgeki no Vanpaiya); 11. "Queen's Contract" (女王とのケイヤク, Joō to no Keiyaku)
Official Japanese: Yūichirō joins the long-sought vampire annihilation unit. Mitsuba becomes overconfident and joins the unit from Shibuya. However, Yūichirō inadvertently leads his friends into a trap for the vampires to lure them. Official English: Yūichirō survives the trial to acquire Cursed Gear, a demon-possessed weaponry and humanity's only hope for fighting vampires. But times are dangerous, and instead of getting to celebrate his newfound power, Yūichirō and his friends receive their first mission: head to Shinjuku and investigate vampire activity. Unbeknownst to Yūichirō, Mika, now a vampire, goes to the same place.
4	January 4, 2014	978-4-08-870897-3	March 3, 2015	978-1-42-157153-9
12. "A Very Safe Supplement" (安全なクスリ, Anzen na Kusuri); 13. "Reunion of Childhood Friends" (幼馴染のサイカイ, Osananajimi no Saikai); 14. "Everyone's a Sinner" (みんなツミビト, Min'na Tsumibito); 15. "Complicated Connections" (工作するカンケイ, Kōsakusuru Kankei)
Official Japanese: Guren's team struggles against aristocrats vampires in the battle against in Shinjuku. Yūichirō rushes there, and helps Asuramaru kill the enemy. Official English: A vampire attack reunites childhood friends Yūichirō and Mika, though they fight each other from opposing sides of the battlefield. Mika forces Yūichirō to leave the battlefield and escape with him, but Yūichirō returns there. Yūichirō transforms into a monstrous being with one seraphic wing.
5	May 2, 2014	978-4-08-880063-9	June 2, 2015	978-1-42-157869-9
16. "Human World" (人間のセカイ, Ningen no Sekai); 17. "Cursed Guinea Pig" (呪うモルモット, Norou Morumotto); 18. "Possessed by Mahiru" (憑依するマヒル, Hyōisuru Mahiru); 19. "Cause for Madness" (暴走のリュウ, Bōsō no Ryū)
Official Japanese: Yūichirō regains consciousness and is cross-examined by the Hiiragi family. Upon encountering the arrogant attitude of the Hiiragi family, Yuichiro realizes the importance of his friends. In order to save Mika, Yūichirō trains with the military. Official English: Yūichirō has no memory of his transformation in Shinjuku. The widely feared leaders of the Japanese Imperial Demon Army. However, Yuichiro takes a note of his squad's unusual talent. Despite unwanted attention, his resolve to save Mika from the vampires crystallizes as his real training in demon possession and manifestation begins.
6	September 4, 2014	978-4-08-880180-3	September 1, 2015	978-1-42-158030-2
20. "The Demon's Nightmare" (悪魔のアクム, Akuma no Akumu); 21. "Kiseki-ō's Box" (鬼箱王のハコ, Kiseki-ō no Bako); 22. "Taboo Krul" (禁忌のクルル, Kinki no Kururu); 23. "Ambition in the Demon Army" (帝鬼軍のヤボウ, Tei Oni-gun no Yabō)
Official Japanese: Yūichirō talks to Asuramaru while training. Kimizuki confronts his partner. Official English: The only thing standing between humans and complete slavery to vampires is their tenacity and Cursed Gear. Yūichirō has the first in droves, but to increase the amount of power he can draw from the demon inside his cursed sword, he enters a coma-like state to thin the barrier between human and demon. His power boost comes none too soon as Krul reveals her plan to destroy humanity.
7	January 5, 2015	978-4-08-880283-1	December 1, 2015	978-1-42-158264-1
24. "The Moon Demon's Orders" (月鬼のゴウレイ, Tsuki Oni no Gōrei); 25. "Narumi & The 20-Year-Old Yu" (鳴海とハタチ, Narumi to Hatachi); 26. "Thirst Logic" (血乏するリセイ, Chitomosuru Risei); 27. "Vampire Noble Lucal" (貴族のルカル, Kizoku no Rukaru)
Official Japanese: In response to the order to sortie in Nagoya, Yūichirō and his friends arrive late for the unit's gathering place. Despite their punishment, they train with Guren and his mercenaries. Official English: Thanks to intelligence acquired by the upper echelons of the Japanese Imperial Demon Army, the human resistance knows that the vampire nobles are massing in Nagoya, before they can invade Tokyo in one month. Yūichirō's squad joins a secret mission to exterminate them, but they lack control.
8	April 3, 2015	978-4-08-880339-5; ISBN 978-4-08-908241-6 (limited edition)	March 1, 2016	978-1-42-158515-4
28. "Livestock Revolt" (反逆するカチク, Hangyakusuru Kachiku); 29. "Who's Pulling the Strings?" (黒幕はダレダ, Kuromaku wa Dare da); 30. "Sword of Justice" (正義のツルギ, Seigi no Tsurugi); 31. "Shinya and Guren" (深夜とグレン, Shin'ya to Guren)
Official Japanese: In the vampire annihilation operation in Nagoya, Yūichirō and his colleagues work with the Narumi's squad to kill the aristocratic vampires. Meanwhile, the troops were killed and Crowley took hostages. Official English: The Japanese Imperial Demon Army descends on the vampire nobles, aiming to exterminate them. Three squads are assigned to take down each of eight nobles. Because they are undermanned in comparison, Shinoa and Narumi's squads work together to defeat a noble. But lurking amongst the nobles is Crowley Eusford, a formidable vampire eager to drink dry his would-be vanquishers.
9	September 4, 2015	978-4-08-880472-9	June 7, 2016	978-1-42-158704-2
32. "Crowley in Control" (君臨するクローリー, Kunrinsuru Kurōrī); 33. "Demon's Lullaby" (鬼のコモリウタ, Oni no Komoriuta); 34. "Asura's Power" (阿朱羅丸のチカラ, Ashūramaru no Chikara); (Bonus) "Yu and Guren" (優とグレン, Yū to Guren)
Official Japanese: The soldiers rescue the hostages from Nagoya, but when the vampires capture Guren, Yūichirō forcefully leaves him. Official English: The Japanese Imperial Demon Army descends on the vampire nobles, aiming to exterminate them. The nobles fall one by one until vampire Crowley Eusford takes twenty human hostages. He interrogates Guren for the information.
10	December 4, 2015	978-4-08-880503-0	September 6, 2016	978-1-42-158854-4
35. "Traitorous Allies" (裏切りのミカタ, Uragiri no Mikata); 36. "Yu & Mika" (優とミカ, Yū to Mika); 37. "Monsters & Family" (家族とバケモノ, Kazoku to Bakemono); 38. "The Namanari Awakens" (目覚めるナマナリ, Mezameru Namanari)
Official Japanese: The Moon Demon Company withdraws from the front line, encounters Mikaela who appears alone to help Yūichirō and starts fighting. Shinoa and her friends, allow Mikaela and Yūichirō to escape from the military. Official English: Possessed by Asuramaru, Yūichirō falls unconscious and Mika escorts him safely. Yūichirō wakes up and discovers Mika dying at the abandoned supermarket. Mika drinks the blood from Yūichirō, and he becomes half-human and vampire. He tells him that a group of scientists have created Seraph of the End, a forbidden experiment killing any humans and vampires.
11	May 2, 2016	978-4-08-880677-8	January 3, 2017	978-1-42-159133-9
39. "The Beginning of the Plan" (計画のハジマリ, Keikaku no Hajimari); 40. "Trumpet of the Apocalypse" (滅びのラッパ, Horobi no Rappa); 41. "Arrogant Love" (傲慢なアイ, Gōman'na ai); 42. "Sanguinem's End" (終焉のサングィネム, Shuuen no Sanguinemu); 43. "Where It All Begins" (始まりのマチ, Hajimari no Machi)
Official Japanese: At Nagoya Airport, where the Moon Demon Company withdrew, military executive Kureto Hiragi, launched the experiment for unforgivable casualties. This causes Yūichirō to lose his trust to Guren and the military. Official English: While reunited, Mika goes on the brink of death, but Yu offers his blood for him. Meanwhile, the captured Guren attempts to lure the vampires into a trap set by Kureto, who plans to kill everyone using the Seraph of the End. All groups arrive at Nagoya Airport.
12	September 2, 2016	978-4-08-880781-2	June 6, 2017	978-1-42-159439-2
44. "A Drive Along Death's Shoreline" (死海ドライブ, Shikai Doraibu); 45. "Familiar Faces" (懐かしいクビ, Natsukashī Kubi); 46. "Return of the Hero" (英雄のキカン, Eiyū no Kikan); 47. "Prayer's Price" (祈りのダイショウ, Inori no Daishō)
Official Japanese: Ferid and Crowley discover Shinoa's squad leaving the Japanese Imperial Demon Army. Due to the overwhelming strength, Yūichirō and his friends abandoned their escape and were forced to cooperate. Meanwhile, Guren returned to Shinjuku. Official English: Three months after the invasion of Nagoya, Yūichirō and his friends avoid a hostile group vampires and humans. Just as they resolve to ask Krul Tepes for help, Ferid Bathory and Crowley Eusford intercept them with a suspicious proposal to become the group's new best friends, bringing with them a special hostage for good measure and the secret of the true purpose of the experiment.
13	December 31, 2016	978-4-08-880892-5	November 7, 2017	978-1-42-159651-8
48. "The Making of an Angel" (天使のシクミ, Tenshi no Shikumi); 49. "Progenitor's Memory" (始祖のオモイデ Shiso no Omoide); 50. "Brothers in Blood" (血のキョウダイ Chi no Kyōdai); 51. "Crucifying the Immortal" (不死者ハリツケ, Fushi-sha Haritsuke)
Official Japanese: Yūichirō and his friends hear the vampire's word said by Guren. Heading to Osaka Bay with Ferid, a mysterious person appears in front of the captured Krul. High-ranking ancestors have arrived from overseas. Official English: Ferid tricks Yuichiro's Squad into joining him, and Crowley on a field trip to Osaka. According to Ferid, the purpose of the trip is to see the truth behind the Calamity that ended the world – ground zero of the apocalypse. The vampire nobles come across Osaka.
14	May 2, 2017	978-4-08-881079-9	April 3, 2018	978-1-42-159823-9
52. "Suspicious Mansion" (怪しいヤカタ, Ayashī Yakata); 53. "Holy Knight's Secret" (聖騎士のヒミツ, Hijiri kishi no himitsu); 54. "Sinner's Christmas" (罪人のクリスマス, Tsumibito no kurisumasu); 55. "Coffins of Obsession" (執着のカンヶ, Shūchaku no Kanke)
Official Japanese: Further strength is essential to save Krul who have been tortured by sunlight. Therefore, Yūichirō and his friends enter Ferid's House. Shinoa squad talks with Mikaela whether they can trust vampires as friends. Official English: Ferid Bathory and Krul Tepes are captured by other vampire nobles, and the members of Shinoa Squad forcefully bide their time while the two vampires are sentenced to days of exposure torture. Meanwhile, the Demon Army is gearing up for a coup in Shibuya, but Guren has a plan for Yūichirō.
15	November 2, 2017	978-4-08-881150-5	September 4, 2018	978-19-7470142-1
56. "Loose-Lipped Vampire" (お喋りヴァンパイア, Oshaberi Vuanpaia); 57. "Defining a King" (王とはナ二力, Ō to wa na ni chikara); 58. "A Reason to Survive" (生存リユウ, Seizon Riyū); 59. "Who Is Your Owner?" (飼い主はダレカ, Kainushi wa dareka)
Official Japanese: Guren, who have betrayed, appeared in front of Yuichiro and others in Osaka. Guren tells that the mastermind behind the series of events is not Hiiragi. Around the same time, a coup d'etat was held in Shibuya. Official English: With Ferid and Krul undergoing exposure torture, the only one left who can help Yūichirō and his friends is Guren. However, Guren has secrets of his own that he plans to kill his friends and protect. Meanwhile, Kureto wages war in Shibuya against his father in a coup d'état.
16	April 4, 2018	978-4-08-881406-3	March 5, 2019	978-19-7470397-5
60. "Surrounding Ky Luc" (キ・ルク包囲戦, Ki Ruku Hōi-sen); 61. "Who Is More Bored?" (退屈なクラベ, Taikutsuna Kurabe); 62. "Unremembered Trauma" (知らないトラウマ, Shiranai Torauma); 63. "Proof of Being Human" (人間のアカシ, Ningen no Akashi); (Bonus) "The Demon Army of Ikebukuro" (池袋のテイキグン, Ikebukuro no Teikigun)
Official Japanese: The match against Ky Luc begins. Guren and his friends struggle even though they plan a detailed demonstration battle. Soon, Yūichirō and his friends visit Guren's childhood house in Nagoya. Official English: The battle to save Ferid and Krul Tepes from Ky Luc begins in full force. Ky Luc is a Fifth Progenitor. Shinoa's Squad and Guren finalize the plan: use the Seraph inside Yūichirō to overwhelm Luc.
17	October 4, 2018	978-4-08-881594-7	June 4, 2019	978-19-7470781-2
64. "The Name of an Angel" (天使のナマエ, Tenshi no Namae); 65. "Not Human" (人間デハナイ, Ningen de Hanai); 66. "Shuttered Shinoa" (閉鎖のシノア, Heisa no Shinoa); 67. "The Door into Puberty" (思春期のトビラ, Shishunki no Tobira); 68. "Saviors" (救世主タチ, Kyūseishu Tachi); 69. "The Day the Sun Was Lost" (太陽をウシナウ日, Taiyō o Ushinau-bi)
Official Japanese: The angel, the Sixth trumpet, sealed at Guren's childhood house in Nagoya. The angel who destroyed the people tries to kill Yūichirō, but he decides to save the attacking angel. In a fierce battle, Shinoa and the others aid him. Official English: After rescuing Ferid, Yuichiro and the gang regroup at Guren's childhood home. There, Guren reveals a terrible secret: the angel was summoned with the original apocalypse and was trapped inside. Yūichirō and his friends work together to defeat it. Meanwhile, Krul is taken to Second Progenitor Urd Geales, the current leader of the vampires. There, she reveals her secrets.
18	March 4, 2019	978-4-08-881768-2	February 4, 2020	978-19-7471065-2
70. "Retainer's Cause" (従者のタイギ, Jūsha no Taigi); 71. "Three Black Demons" (黒鬼のサンニン, Kuroki no Sannin); 72. "Hiragi in a Cage" (檻の中のヒイラギ, Ori no Naka no Hīragi); 73. "Inside Yu's Sword" (優の刀のナカ, Yū no Katana no Naka); 74. "Love Awakens" (恋がメザメル, Koi ga Mezameru)
Official Japanese: Yūichirō and his friends return to Shibuya. Although they are uninvited guests, they are welcomed by the head of the Hiiragi family. However, Mikaela feels a terrible sign. Shikama Doji is later possessed by Kureto. Official English: Yūichirō and his friends return to the Demon Army for the final battle. At the base, Kureto struggles to stave off Shikama Dōji from possessing him. But things quickly begin to fall apart when Dōji tries to possess Shinoa and Yūichirō.
19	September 4, 2019	978-4-08-882061-3	July 7, 2020	978-19-7471064-5
75. "Secret Distance" (秘密のキョリ, Himitsu no Kiyori); 76. "Age of Immortals" (不死者のセダイ, Fushisha no Sedai); 77. "Rescue for the Devil" (悪魔キュウサイ, Akuma Kyuusai); 78. "The Dark Ages of Greece" (暗黒のギリシャ, Ankoku no Girisha); 79. "Eternal Hell" (永遠にジゴク, Eien ni Jigoku)
Official Japanese: Shikama Doji possesses Shinoa. The sign of the revival of the First is also transmitted to vampires and Hyakuya. Ferid tries to kill Shinoa. The vampires fight against the military, when the signal of war occurred. The memories of Yūichirō and Asuramaru have been changed. Official English: Shinoa fights at the Demon Army headquarters where the First Progenitor, Shikama Dōji, tries to possess her. Ferid reveals the ultimatum between killing her or letting her get possessed by the demon. With all of the pieces in place and the First's resurrection all but complete, the vampires and the Hyakuya Sect both converge on Shibuya. Meanwhile, Asuramaru reveals the missing past for Yuichiro.
20	February 4, 2020	978-4-08-882210-5	February 2, 2021	978-19-7471973-0
80. "Lightning over Shibuya" (雷降るシブヤ, Kaminari furu Shibuya); 81. "Fallen Wings" (堕天したツバサ, Daten shita Tsubasa); 82. "Mahiru-no-Yo" (真昼ノ夜, Mahiru-no-Yoru); 83. "Two Demons" (鬼ニヒキ, Oni Nihiki); 84. "Nativity of a Princess" (降誕するヒメギミ, Kōtan suru Himegimi)
Official Japanese: The battle between the Japanese Imperial Demon Army and Hyakuya intensifies. First and Saito develop a battle like a gods, at the same time Guren and Mahiru set a plan in motion. Official English: The Hyakuya Sect descends on the Demon Army as the First Progenitor, Sika Madu possesses Shinoa. Second Progenitor Rígr Stafford leads the invasion. Meanwhile, Guren and Mahiru enact their long-awaited plan.
21	June 4, 2020	978-4-08-882321-8	June 1, 2021	978-1-9747-1063-8
85. "The Guinea Pigs Gather" (揃うジッケンタイ, Sorō jikkentai); 86. "Run from Your Friends" (味方からニゲロ, Mikata kara Nigero); 87. "Cannibal Family" (共喰いカゾク, Kyōkui Kazoku); 88. "Ashera Tepes" (阿朱羅ツェペシ, Ashura Tsepesu); 89. "Vampire's End" (吸血鬼のオワリ, Kyūketsuki no Owari)
Official Japanese: Guren appears in front of the captive Yūichirō, but does not release the restraint. Mahiru ambushes Mikaela and Noya attacks Yūichirō and Mikaela. Yūichirō believes in Guren, but decides to escape with Mikaela. Official English: Guren follows Yūichirō's captors, but does nothing to save him from the Hyakuya Sect's clutches. Mahiru ambushes Mika. Meanwhile, Noya, the other demon inside Guren, stands and watches the situation unfold. Despite Guren's apparent betrayal, Yūichirō trusts him.
22	October 2, 2020	978-4-08-882440-6	October 5, 2021	978-1-9747-2344-7
90. "Because of Mikaela" (理由はミカエラ, Riyū wa Mikaera); 91. "Orphan Prince" (孤児プリンス, Minashigo Purinsu); 92. "Black Demon Scenario" (黒鬼のシナリオ, Kuro Oni no Shinario); 93. "Desire Within Desire" (欲の中のヨク, Yoku no Naka no Yoku); 94. "Hole in the Sun" (太陽のアナ, Taiyō no Ana)
Official Japanese: While Shinoa and others run to rescue Yūichirō, Mikaela is about to disappear, and Yūichirō notices he would abandon himself. Meanwhile, Ferid tries to stop Saito. Official English: The battle for the world continues as the vampires, human armies and sects converge and fight it out in Shibuya. Distraught at the loss of Mika, Yūichirō struggles to maintain control over his emotions, and he begs Asuramaru to kill him. Krul Tepes steps in and offers Yūichirō a glimmer of hope. Meanwhile, Guren rampages on as he attempts to fix the past, and Ferid visits Rígr Stafford.
23	February 4, 2021	978-4-08-882556-4	February 1, 2022	978-1-9747-2649-3
95. "A Demon's Tale" (鬼のモノガタリ, Oni no Monogatari); 96. "Queen Krul" (女王クルル, Joō Kururu); 97. "Sisters" (姉とイモウト, Ane to Imōto); 98. "The King's Chambers" (王のヘヤ, Ō no Heya)
Official Japanese: Shinoa's squad escapes from the tragedy with Mikaela and rest. However, Kimizuki is keenly aware of the difference in power with Yūichirō. And when Krul woke up what happened eight years ago about Mahiru. Official English: Yūichirō and his friends regroup to plot out their next steps in the ongoing war between the humans, vampires, and the Hyakuya Sect, and time is not on their side. Shinoa fights for the First trapped inside of her. But the First has allies on the outside. With Krul now on Shinoa squad's side, they may actually have a chance of winning and saving Mika. At first, the gang learns the truth of what happened between Krul and Mika eight years ago.
24	June 4, 2021	978-4-08-882678-3	June 21, 2022	978-1-9747-2901-2
99. "Mortal Love" (人間のコイゴコロ, Ningen no Koigokoro); 100. "A Demon Appears" (鬼がデタ, Oni ga Deta); 101. "My Desire" (僕のヨクボウ, Boku no Yokubou); 102. "He's Calling for Me" (あいつが、ヨンデル, Aitsu ga, Yonderu)
Official Japanese: Asuramaru moves to capture Mikaela at the command of the Shikama Doji. On the other hand, Shinoa suppresses her awakening and senses the command. Yūichirō and his friends equip a demon curse for Mikaela. Official English: Asuramaru and the other black cursed gear demons' betrayal of their hosts strikes a heavy blow in the war against the vampires, Shikama Dōji, and the Hyakuya Sect. Shikama Dōji has ordered Asuramaru to capture Mikaela's soul before he has a chance to possess anyone. While Shinoa continues to fight to keep Shikama Dōji locked away inside of her soul, Yūichirō and his friends are in a race against time to save Mika in the one way humans know how to handle black demons: by binding his soul to a new cursed gear weapon!
25	October 4, 2021	978-4-08-882812-1	September 20, 2022	978-1-9747-3238-8
103. "The Sky Awaits Them Both" (空は二人をミテイル, Sora wa Futari o Miteiru); 104. "The Same Dream" (同じ夢をミル, Onaji yume o miru); 105. "Saito and Urd" (斉藤とウルド, Saitō to Urudo); 106. "I Am Your..." (僕はキミノ, Boku wa Kimi no)
Official Japanese: Shikama Doji, who held back by Shinoa, finally wakes up, but for some reason he left the Hiiragi sisters. Meanwhile, Yuichiro decides to fight with Mikaela to save him. Official English: The battle in Shinjuku rages on as millennia-old schemes continue to influence events now unfolding. Despite her best efforts, Shinoa struggles to suppress Doji, who soon overpowers her and makes his escape. Meanwhile, Yuichiro resolves to save Mika. He possesses him, and memories from a lost time flood the demon's mind. As he digs further into his soul, he begins to question him.
26	February 4, 2022	978-4-08-883025-4	January 17, 2023	978-1-9747-3613-3
107. "Angel's Plan" (天使のケイカク, Tenshi no keikaku); 108. "Yu's Sword" (優のツルギ, Yū no Tsurugi); 109. "Moving Pieces " (走るコマ, Hashiru koma); 110. "Expose the Past to the Sun" (過去を白日にサラセ, Kako o hakujitsu ni sarase)
Official Japanese: After seeing Yuichiro's past, Mikaela opens his heart and decides to become his demon. However, Doji's relentless attack prevents him from doing so. At the same time, Kimizuki, Yoichi and the others arrive to save them. Official English: Having seen Yuichiro's past, Mikaela opens his heart and accepts becoming Yuichiro's new demon. But Shikama Doji attacks, trying to keep them from joining forces! Kimizuki, Yoichi, and the rest of Yuichiro's friends come to their rescue just in time, allowing them to complete the ritual. Now that Mikaela has become a demon and Yuichiro's Cursed Gear, do they finally have the power to stand up against Shikama Doji.
27	June 3, 2022	978-4-08-883131-2	July 18, 2023	978-1-9747-3863-2
111. "Yu & Guren" (優とグレン, Yū to Guren); 112. "Defining Family" (家族のテイギ, Kazoku no Teigi); 113. "Everyone's Secrets" (みんなのヒミツ, Min'na no Himitsu); 114. "Everyone's Goals" (全員のゴール, Zen'in no Gōru)
Official Japanese: Before fighting, Yuichiro asks Guren the truth, but he does not reply. Official English: At the safe house, Yuichiro interrogates with Guren, but he does not reply the truth.
28	October 4, 2022	978-4-08-883267-8	November 21, 2023	978-1-9747-4131-1
115. "Choices and Decisions" (選択とケツダン, Sentaku to Ketsudan); 116. "Brother and Sister" (兄とイモウト, Ani to Imōto); 117. "Of Monsters and Demons" (鬼とバケモノ, Oni to Bakemono); 118. "I Hear Voices" (声がキコエル, Koe ga Kikoeru)
Official Japanese: When Yuichiro inadvertently chooses between having a family life, Mikaela convinces him to follow them. Official English: Yuichiro inadvertently makes a terrible decision, but Mika convinces him to join the family. His choice forces him to demand even greater power from Asuramaru. Meanwhile, Urd and Rígr capture Sika Madu, the First Progenitor, and demand to know the truth behind the plan and why he abandoned them.
29	February 3, 2023	978-4-08-883379-8	March 19, 2024	978-1-9747-4346-9
119. "Our Goals" (僕らのゴール, Bokura no Gōru); 120. "The Price of Appetite" (食欲のダイショウ, Shokuyoku no Daishō); 121. "Last Dawn" (最後のヒノデ, Saigo no Hinode); 122. "Calories for Travel" (旅するカロリー, Tabi Suru Karorī)
Official Japanese: Yuichiro and Mikaela leave Shinoa's squad, choosing their own way than Guren and Doji. A journey to save humanity begins. They plan to explore the past with desire. Official English: Given the choice of two extremes, Yu picks a third option. Instead of following Guren or the First's plans, he forges his own path. He and Mika leave Shinoa's squad, vowing to save everyone. But to do that, the two delve into the past and learn what happened. And to make that dive, Yu suppresses a lot of energy, but provisions are scarce. The two resort to devious means to make that happen for the sake of the world.
30	July 4, 2023	978-4-08-883623-2	July 16, 2024	978-1-9747-4590-6
123. "An Ancient Game of Tag" (太古でカケッコ, Taiko de Kakekko); 124. "An Elevator to Paradise" (楽園エレベーター, Rakuen Erebētā); 125. "Soft Serve with Father" (父とソフトクリーム, Chichi to Sofuto Kurīmu); 126. "Purgatory and Paradise" (地獄とラクエン, Jigoku to Rakuen)
Official Japanese: Yuichiro and Mikaela travel back to the past. Behind the new door lies a shocking sight preceding the birth of mankind. There is an angel resembling Mikaela. The two arrive at the giant city of angels. Official English: Yu and Mikaela pop out in a shocking time well before the birth of humanity. When dinosaurs roamed the earth, they continue on and run into an angel looking suspiciously like Mikaela, who leads them to a mythical city with a large tower leading to the heavens.
31	November 2, 2023	978-4-08-883694-2	November 12, 2024	978-1-9747-4936-2
127. "Love or Loyalty" (忠誠かアイか, Chūsei ka ai ka); 128. "The Wings of Icarus" (イカロスの翼, Ikarosu no Tsubasa); 129. "The First Vampire" (初めのヴァンパイア, Hajime no Vanpaia); 130. "The Light Which Remains" (残ったヒカリ, Nokotta Hikari)
Official Japanese: Mikaela is attacked by Saito. He, who was born with great power, suppresses him, but becomes confused when he hears that his presence is taboo and Shikama Doji gets punished. Mikaela, realizing his father's predicament, puts knife to his neck.
32	April 4, 2024	978-4-08-883889-2	March 18, 2025	978-1-9747-5262-1
131. "Exoneration for Everyone" (全員メンザイ, Zen'in Menzai); 132. "Battle to The First" (始祖トッパセン, Shiso Toppasen); 133. "Maidens in Love" (恋するオトメ, Koisuru Otome); 134. "Reincarnation Rondo" (輪廻ロンド, Rin'ne Rondo); 135. "Front Seats to the End" (終わりのサイゼンセン, Owari no Saizensen)
Official Japanese: Yuichiro and Mikaela regain their memories. They promise each other to risk themselves for a new strategy. They go to Saito and other vampires, where they try to talk to them, but the fight starts. Meanwhile, Shinoa's squad resumes their activities in their wish to save Yu.
33	October 4, 2024	978-4-08-884217-2	September 9, 2025	978-1-9747-5841-8
136. "The Godtouched" (神宿りのフタり, Kamiyadori no Futari); 137. "The Queen's Time" (女王のジカン, Joō no Jikan); 138. "Really for Real" (絶対のゼッタイ, Zettai no Zettai); 139. "Two Monsters" (二人のバケモノ, Futari no Bakemono); 140. "The World I Want" (俺が目指すセカイ, Ore ga Mezasu Sekai)
34	April 4, 2025	978-4-08-884532-6	June 16, 2026	978-1-9747-6393-1
141. "A Reason Not to Die" (死なないリユウ, Shinanai Riyuu); 142. "What's the Point?" (意味がアルカ?, Imi ga Aruka?); 143. "His Dreams" (彼のユメ, Kare no Yume); 144. "Spring at 25" (25歳 のハル, 25-sai no Haru); 145. "A Philosophical Philosopher" (哲学するテツガクシャ, Tetsugaku Suru Tetsugakusha)
35	November 4, 2025	978-4-08-884706-1	November 10, 2026	978-1-9747-6853-0
146. "The Promise They Made" (約束したフタリ, Yakusoku Shita Futari); 147. "Looking Across the Sea" (海をナガメテ, Umi o Nagamete); 148. "Sorry If It Doesn't Work" (駄目ならゴメン, Damenara Gomen); 149. "They Were Once 16" (かつての16歳タチ, Katsute no 16-sai tachi); 150. "An Anti-Heroic Awakening" (覚醒するアンチヒロイックサーガ, Kakusei Suru Anchihiroikku Sāga)
36	May 1, 2026	978-4-08-885047-4	TBA	—
151. "Desperately Struggling to the End" (みっともなくサイゴマデ, Mittomonaku Saigomade); 152. "Guren Ichinose: Catastrophe at 16" (一瀬グレン 16歳のカタストロフィ, Ichinose Guren 16-sai no Katasutorofi); 153. "The Flash of Youth" (青春のカガヤキ, Seishun no Kagayaki); 154. "Yoichi's Sister" (与一のアネ, Yoichi no Ane); 155. "Family & Family" (家族とカゾク, Kazoku to Kazoku)

=== Chapters not yet in tankōbon format ===
156. "Despite It All" (それにもかかわらず, Sore ni mo Kakawarazu)
157. "Family and Friends"
158. "A Chain of Meaning"
159. "A Maiden in Love"
160. “The Seraph of the End”

== Seraph of the End: Guren Ichinose: Catastrophe at Sixteen ==
A spin-off manga adaptation of Guren's light novel series was drawn by Yo Asami. It was serialized in Kodansha's Monthly Shōnen Magazine from June 6, 2017 to February 4, 2022. The first tankōbon volume was released on November 2, 2017.

No.	Original release date	Original ISBN	English release date	English ISBN
1	November 2, 2017	978-4-06-392610-1	July 25, 2023	978-1-64-729237-9
2	April 4, 2018	978-4-06-511189-5	July 25, 2023	978-1-64-729237-9
3	August 3, 2018	978-4-06-512362-1	October 24, 2023	978-1-64-729274-4
4	November 30, 2018	978-4-06-513828-1	October 24, 2023	978-1-64-729274-4
5	May 2, 2019	978-4-06-515557-8	January 30, 2024	978-1-64-729309-3
6	September 4, 2019	978-4-06-517099-1	January 30, 2024	978-1-64-729309-3
7	February 4, 2020	978-4-06-518613-8	April 30, 2024	978-1-64-729310-9
8	June 4, 2020	978-4-06-520095-7	April 30, 2024	978-1-64-729310-9
9	November 4, 2020	978-4-06-521423-7	July 30, 2024	978-1-64-729352-9
10	March 4, 2021	978-4-06-522261-4	July 30, 2024	978-1-64-729352-9
11	August 4, 2021	978-4-06-524135-6	October 29, 2024	978-1-64-729380-2
12	March 4, 2022	978-4-06-526465-2	October 29, 2024	978-1-64-729380-2
