= Guren Graduate Institute =

Educational institution in Ulaanbaatar, Mongolia

Guren Graduate Institute was established in 2006 as a degree-granting institution. It now offers an Executive master's degree in Public Administration and partners with Harvard Business Publishing for executive education.

Guren Graduate Institute is currently developing online courses for K-12 students and undergraduate students, including civil aviation courses with IATA, and financial courses with the New York Institute of Finance.

The institute also partners with McKinsey Academy to train consultants for the mining business sector. As a professional educational provider, the Guren Graduate Institute has worked with the Central Bank of Mongolia, the Ministry of Finance, and the National Academy of Governance.

The current Project Director of Guren Graduate Institute is Davaausuren Byambachuluun and the current Operations Manager is Tamir Mergen

== Etymology ==
The name Guren was based on 'Gurun'. The name was conceptualized by its current director, Demberel Dorjchuluun. Gurun means being a local leader and global partner.
