= Stephen Glynne =

Stephen Glynne may refer to:

- Sir Stephen Glynne, 3rd Baronet (1665–1729)
- Sir Stephen Glynne, 4th Baronet (c. 1696–1729)
- Sir Stephen Glynne, 7th Baronet (1744–1780)
- Sir Stephen Glynne, 8th Baronet (1780–1815)
- Sir Stephen Glynne, 9th Baronet (1807–1874), Welsh politician and antiquarian

== See also ==
- Glynne baronets
- Glyn Stephens
