= Glenn E. Martin =

American social justice consultant

Glenn Martin
- Martin in 2015
- Born: October 30, 1970 (age 55); New York City, U.S.
- Education: Canisius College

Glenn E. Martin (born October 30, 1970) is the president and founder of GEMtrainers.com, a social justice consultancy firm that partners with non-profits from across the United States to assist with fundraising, organizational development and marketing. Martin is an American criminal justice reform advocate and is the founder and former president of JustLeadershipUSA (JLUSA). He also founded the campaign, #CLOSErikers and co-founded the Education from the Inside Out Coalition, a national campaign working to remove barriers to higher education facing students while they are in prison and once they are released.

Martin resigned from JLUSA before (December 17, 2017) being accused of sexual misconduct by three women.

Martin regularly comments on criminal justice in the media, including CNN, C-SPAN, Al Jazeera, and MSNBC.

== Early life and family ==
Martin was born and raised in Bedford Stuyvesant, Brooklyn, New York. He is the son of a retired police officer.

== New York prison ==
Martin spent six years incarcerated in New York prisons. In 1994, at the age of 24, Martin was convicted for an armed robbery of a New York City jewelry store and was sentenced to six years in prison. He was detained on Rikers Island for a year and served five additional years in the Wyoming Correctional Facility in Attica, New York, for his role in several armed robberies.

=== Education ===
While in prison, Martin took college level courses. Martin views his liberal arts education as a key turning point in his life. While at the Wyoming Correctional Facility, Martin earned an associate degree in social science from the Jesuit Canisius College based in Buffalo, New York. Martin faced barriers to employment with a criminal record even though he had a college degree.

=== Release ===
In 2000, Martin was released from prison in upstate Attica, New York. At release, a correctional officer thanked him: "He said my being there helped pay for his boat, and that when my son came there, he would help pay for his son's boat."

== United States criminal justice reform ==
Martin has worked with and founded various criminal justice reform non-profits. Martin also regularly comments on criminal justice issues. Martin has been critical of the disenfranchisement of felons in New York state, and in the United States. In 2014, Martin gave a guest lecture at Bennington College on criminal justice reform.

=== Legal Action Center ===
Upon release from prison, Martin began his career with the Legal Action Center (LAC). Martin eventually served as the co-director of LAC's Helping Individuals with criminal records Reenter through Employment (H.I.R.E.) Network. Martin worked to address the obstacles facing ex-offenders who try to reconnect with their communities and society at large. Martin discussed what he viewed as discrimination faced by people with criminal records, based on their criminal records and their race, noting that people of color are disproportionately represented in the American criminal justice system. Martin regularly spoke with media regarding criminal justice issues.

=== Fortune Society ===
From 2007 until 2014, Martin served as vice president of development and public affairs for the Fortune Society, a group dedicated to helping people returning from prison to succeed with starting new lives. Half of Fortune Society's staff members were formerly incarcerated, and one-third of the board members were formerly incarcerated.

Martin regularly spoke with the national media about criminal justice issues.

=== JustLeadershipUSA ===
In November 2014, Martin founded a new organization, JustLeadershipUSA (JLUSA) with the goal to cut the U.S. correctional population in half by 2030 through advocacy campaigns, leadership trainings, and member engagement. Martin told Mic that he "believes the most compelling advocates of change are those who have been directly affected by incarceration." Martin appeared on the Brian Lehrer show to discuss the purpose of prison. On February 3, 2018, an article in The New York Times revealed that Martin's departure from JLUSA came after he was accused of sexual misconduct.

=== GEMtrainers ===
In April 2018, Martin founded a new organization, GEMtrainers, LLC. to offer discreet, transformational and business-practical coaching for non-profit business leaders seeking to accelerate their performance and that of their organizations. They assist clients with strengthening their personal and organization positioning, brand story, visual identity, and messaging. GEMtrainers, LLC helps clients to build new, effective brands for their advocacy campaigns and neutralize opponents who work to harm movements, by ruthlessly focusing on executing compelling co-created strategies that leave nothing to chance.

=== White House experience ===
In early June 2015, Martin, along with other criminal justice reform activists, were invited to the White House to discuss mass incarceration and law enforcement issues. Martin was flagged by the United States Secret Service as a security risk because of his criminal record, and required to have a special escort in order to enter the White House complex for the discussion. Once cleared, Martin used the incident "to frame the topic for larger criminal justice reform". Ultimately, Martin met with President Obama to discuss JustLeadershipUSA and his efforts to help shrink the criminal justice footprint in the lives of all Americans.

== Awards ==
- Brooke Russell Astor Award (2017)
- Robert F. Kennedy Human Rights Award (2016)
- VOCAL 2016 Gala Honoree (2016)
- The Root 100 (2015)
- Legal Action Center's Arthur L. Liman Public Interest Award (2015)
- Kentucky Colonel, Highest Honor bestowed by KY Governor Steve Beshear (2014)
- Youth Represent (2013)
