= Glen River (Chaudière River tributary) =

River in Estrie, Quebec (Canada)

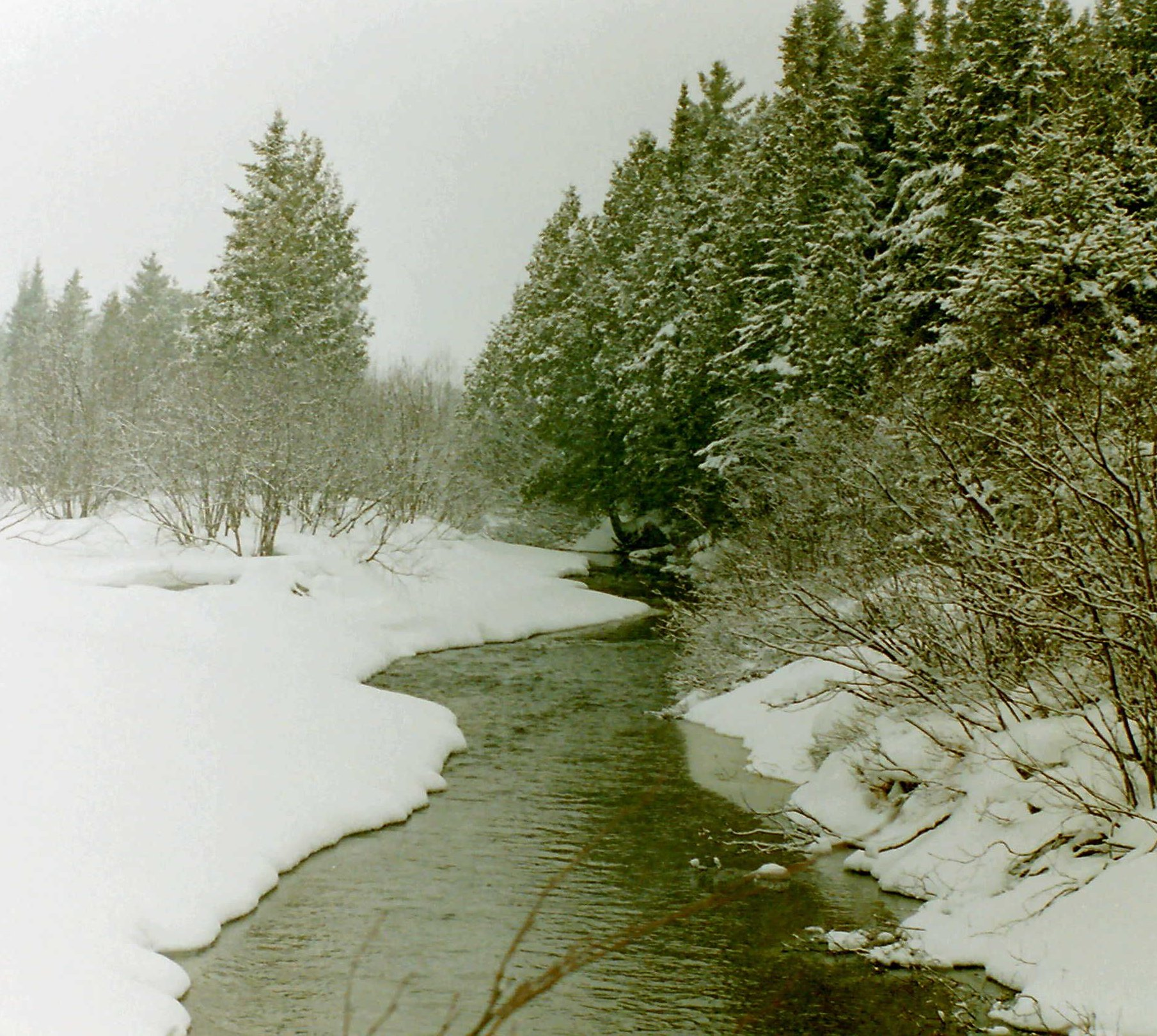
- Glen River 1 kilometer before its confluence with Lac de l'Orignal.

- Location within Quebec
- Native name: Rivière Glen (French)

Location
- Country: Canada
- Province: Quebec
- Region: Estrie
- MRC: Le Granit Regional County Municipality

Physical characteristics
- Source: Mountain stream
  - location: Nantes
  - coordinates: 45.654927°N 70.970635°W
  - elevation: 464 metres (1,522 ft)
- Mouth: Chaudière River
  - location: Sainte-Cécile-de-Whitton
  - coordinates: 45.62139°N 70.85638°W
  - elevation: 378 metres (1,240 ft)
- Length: 14.4 kilometres (8.9 mi)
- Basin size: 63.5 kilometres (39.46 mi)

Basin features
- Progression: Chaudière River, St. Lawrence River
- River system: St. Lawrence River
- Tributaries
  - left: (upstream)
  - right: (upstream)

The Glen River (in French: rivière Glen) is a tributary of the west bank of the Chaudière River which flows north to empty onto the south bank of the St. Lawrence River.

The Glen River flows through the municipalities of Nantes and Sainte-Cécile-de-Whitton, in the Le Granit Regional County Municipality, in the administrative region of Estrie, in Quebec, in Canada.

== Toponymy ==
The toponym Glen River was formalized on October 19, 1971, at the Commission de toponymie du Québec.

== See also ==
- List of rivers of Quebec
