= Global Legal Information Network =

The Global Legal Information Network (GLIN) is a cooperative, not-for-profit federation of government agencies or their designees that contribute national legal information to the GLIN database. It was an automated database of statutes, regulations and related material that originate from countries in the Americas, Europe, Africa and Asia. The data are in a central server at the Library of Congress in Washington, DC. Access was equally shared by all participating national GLIN stations. Anyone with Internet connections could access summaries of and citations to over 168,000 laws from fifty-one nations, although copyright and distribution-rights issues currently preclude public access to full texts. A distributed network is envisioned, and the database will reside on servers in other member nations as well as the Law Library of Congress.

GLIN was initiated by the Law Library of Congress in 1991. The Network celebrated its 15th anniversary in September 2008. As of 2015 the database was no longer accessible.

== "Top 21" Award ==
The Industry Advisory Council (IAC) selected GLIN as one of the "Top 21" Excellence.Gov Award Finalists for 2009. For 2009, the 21 program finalists all met the stringent criteria for "demonstrating excellence in improving organizational performance using information technology." Each year, the Excellence.Gov Awards recognize the federal government's best IT projects and the SIG selects a different theme for the awards. The theme for 2009, "Transparency: Using IT to improve the interaction between Government and its Stakeholders," focuses on how government organizations use IT transparently to improve the public's information gathering abilities, or an agency's ability to deliver information to the public or a particular constituency. A panel of 25 judges "federal government and industry executives" reviewed 60 nominations and selected 21 for recognition at a ceremony on April 14, 2009.
