= Guren =

Japanese word

Guren (紅蓮) is a Japanese word meaning "crimson-colored lotus" commonly encountered in the West when used in an artistic connotation. In Japan, Guren (紅蓮) is "crimson-colored (紅) lotus flower (蓮の花)". It is compared to the color of a flame of a burning fire. In Buddhist terminology, Guren is also an abbreviation for Guren Jigoku (紅蓮地獄), which is the seventh of The Eight Cold Hells. Those who fell there after death, it is said that the skin is torn due to severe cold, and the blood looks like a crimson-colored lotus flower. The 10th century Juichimen Kannon may have had a water jar of Guren in its right hand.

== Derivation ==
- Guren no idohori (紅蓮の井戸掘り): to dig well in Guren Jigoku (紅蓮地獄). This phrase means too much pain, distress, or example of suffering caused by the severe cold.
- Guren no Yumiya (紅蓮の弓矢, English: crimson-colored bow and arrow): This phrase is not accurate Japanese, precisely, there is no Japanese dictionary that explains this sentence. But from the meaning of Guren or Guren Jigoku, it seems that this phrase simply means 'bow and arrow with blood of the shooter'. In other words, this sentence is creating the intention to counterattack despite any suffering or sacrifice.
- Guren no ～ ：This means 『～ of Guren 』 or 『Guren's～』. This phrase is used in many fields of Japan's subculture, for example in lyrics, games, as the team name of Bōsōzoku (暴走族), anime, etc. However, on formal occasions, the usage of this phrase is almost nonexistent.
