= Glenn, Illinois =

- Unincorporated community
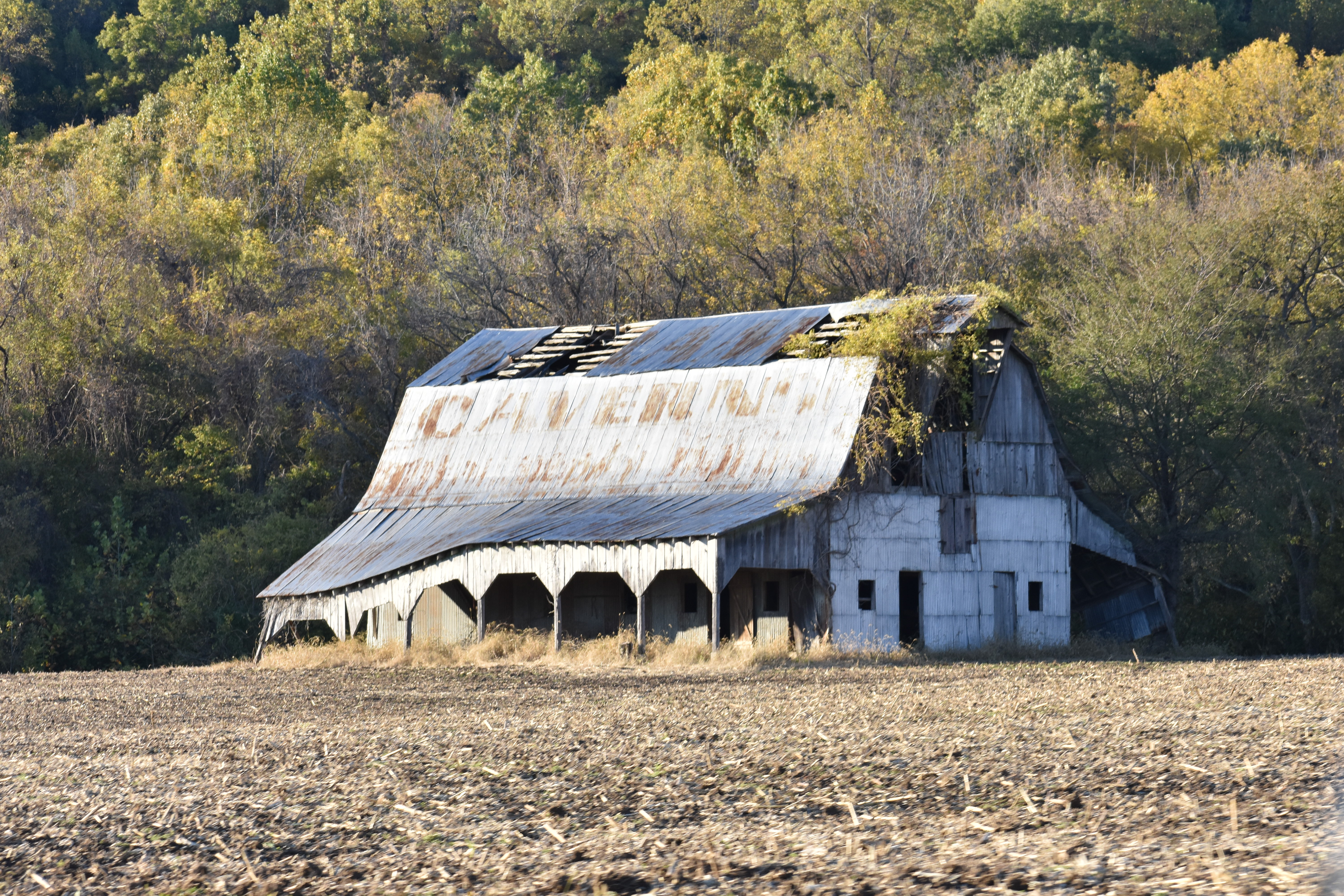
- A barn east of Glenn

- Location within Illinois Location within the United States
- Coordinates: 37°48′13″N 89°34′50″W
- Country: United States
- State: Illinois
- County: Jackson
- Elevation: 384 ft (117 m)
- Time zone: UTC-6 (Central (CST))
  - Summer (DST): UTC-5 (CDT)
- Area code: 618
- GNIS feature ID: 422742

Glenn is an unincorporated community in Kinkaid Township, Jackson County, Illinois, United States. Glenn is located on Illinois Route 3, 7 miles (11 km) east-southeast of Rockwood. Glenn was named after either its first postmaster, Walter J. Glenn, or early settler Robin Glenn.
