= Glynn, U.S. Virgin Islands =

Coordinates: 17°44′54″N 64°46′29″W

Glynn, United States Virgin Islands
- Village
- Interactive map of Glynn, United States Virgin Islands
- Country: United States Virgin Islands
- Island: Saint Croix
- Time zone: UTC-4 (AST)

Glynn is a settlement on the island of Saint Croix in the United States Virgin Islands.
