= Glen (music company) =

Glen, also known as J. & R. Glen, was a music publisher and music instrument manufacturing company located in Edinburgh, Scotland. It was founded in 1827 by Thomas Macbean Glen and was later managed by his sons John and Robert Glen after their father retired in 1867. They were succeeded by John Glen's son Thomas Glen in 1911. It remained in the Glen family until 1978. It continued to operate until 1982.

The Glen company was particularly known for its manufacturing of bagpipes and its publication of music for that instrument. However, the company also manufactured other instruments such as flutes. Archival documents and musical instruments and other artifacts related to the Glen company are held in the National Library of Scotland and in the Edinburgh University Collection of Historic Musical Instruments.
