= List of Tenkai Knights characters =

This is a list of characters of the anime series Tenkai Knights.

== Tenkai Knights ==
=== Guren Nash ===
Voiced by: Meguru Takahashi (Japanese); Johnny Yong Bosch (English)

Guren Nash (大神 グレン, Ōgami Guren; Guren Ougami) is the main protagonist and leader of the new generation of Tenkai Knights, and is 13-14 years old (11-12 years old in the Japanese version). Though he must grow into his role as leader, he is a natural leader and is fearless and optimistic. He can transform into Bravenwolf, the leader of the original Tenkai Knights. He describes himself as "Tenkai Power". As Bravenwolf, he wields a Tenkai Sword and shield. Guren is the first to unlock both Titan mode, growing to twice his normal size and being capable of releasing energy slashes, and Elemental Titan mode, which he loses for a period of time. He is best friends with Ceylan, Toxsa, and Chooki, and soon befriends Gen and Beni. After being infused with a Dragon Cube, his Bravenwolf form changes, becoming known as Bravenwolf Tenkai Firestorm. With his new elemental power, he can create a giant ball of fire on the tip of his sword and throw it at the target.

His core brick is Bravenwolf (ブレイヴン, Bureivun; Braven).

=== Ceylan Jones ===
Voiced by: Akemi Kanda (Japanese); Todd Haberkorn (English)

Ceylan Jones (鷲崎 セイラン, Washizaki Seiran; Seiran Washizaki) is 13-14 years old (11-12 years old in the Japanese version). Though friendly, goofy, outgoing, and a practical joker, he can be surprisingly cautious. Ceylan can transform into Tributon. He describes himself as "Tenkai Speed". As Tributon, he wields a Tenkai Crossbow and Arrow Blaster and a shield. Ceylan is the second to unlock Titan mode, growing to twice his normal size and wielding a long bow blaster that can shoot energy.

Over the course of the series, Ceylan becomes depressed due to his skills not being on par with his fellow Knights. As a result, he nearly quits the team before his friends remind him of what he brings to the table.

His core brick is Tributon (トリビュトン, Toribyuton).

=== Toxsa Dalton ===
Voiced by: Maki Mizuma (Japanese); Benjamin Diskin (English)

Toxsa Dalton (亀山 トクサ, Kameyama Tokusa; Tokusa Kameyama) is in the same grade as his teammates despite being a year younger than them, being 12-13 years old (10-11 years old in the Japanese version). He is intelligent and skilled with technology, enjoying playing video games and tinkering with digital equipment when not helping out at his family's diner. He is also quirky, short-tempered, and is more comfortable with computers than people. Toxsa can transform into Valorn. He describes himself as "Tenkai Strength" and claims to be the physically strongest of the Knights. As Valorn, he wields a Tenkai Lance that can fire green energy charges or a green energy beam from the end as well as a shield. Toxsa is the fourth and final member of the team to unlock Titan mode, growing to twice his normal size and wielding a sword like polearm that can split open to release large energy blasts.

His core brick is Valorn (ヴァローン, Varōn).

=== Chooki Mason ===
Voiced by: Risa Taneda (Japanese); Bryce Papenbrook (English)

Chooki Mason (蜂須賀 チュウキ, Hachisuka Chūki; Chuuki Hachisuka) is 13-14 years old (11-12 years old in the Japanese version). He is calm and the best athlete of the team and always looks forward to a challenge. Chooki can transform into Lydendor. He describes himself as "Tenkai Agility". As Lydendor, he wields a Tenkai Kunai Saber with Chain that he can wield in melee combat and shoot the blade out on a chain to use it as a flail, as well as use as a shield that has three curved blades which he can throw and have return to him. Chooki is the third to unlock Titan mode, growing to twice his normal size and wielding a shield which resembles a large shuriken and he can use both offensively and defensively.

His core brick is Lydendor (ライデンドール, Raidendōru).

=== Gen ===
Voiced by: Miyuki Sawashiro (Japanese); Yuri Lowenthal (English)

Gen (犬飼 ゲン, Inukai Gen; Gen Inukai) is a mysterious new student who transfers to Guren's school. He formerly worked under Vilius and can transform into Dromus, a Tenkai Knight who resembles Bravenwolf but with grey and black armor and a scar on the left eye of his chest plate, also calling himself "Tenkai Power". After losing his parents, he received the Dromus brick from the Tenkai guardian Eurus. After Vilius stole the Black Dragon Key from him, he became the official fifth member of the Tenkai Knights and an ally of the Corekai Soldiers.

His core brick is Dromus (黒騎士, Kurokishi; Krokshi, Black Knight).

=== Mr. White ===
Voiced by: Keiji Fujiwara (Japanese); Brian Beacock (English)

Mr. White (ホワイト, Howaito) is the owner of the Shop of Wonders, which he calls "My Shop Has Absolutely Everything Under the Sun" but admits to be a failure because it did not have customers for years. The portal to the planet Quarton is located in the shop's basement, which he guards alongside his friend Boreas while training the Earth-Modernized Tenkai Knights.

=== Beni ===
Voiced by: Masumi Asano (Japanese); Nika Futterman (English)

Beni (ベニ, Beni) is a pink-haired girl who is an accomplice to Gen and can transform into Venetta, an evil Tenkai Knight with armor resembling a spider. She seeks to have both worlds destroyed because her father spent more time searching for Quarton than with her, feeling that both worlds destroyed her life. Beni tricked the Tenkai Knights into thinking she had turned over a new leaf while working with Gen to manipulate the Knights into finding the Dragon Key for them. After learning that Lord Vilius stole the Black Dragon Key from Dromus, she goes rogue before officially redeeming herself after meeting and spending time with Chooki's cousin Kiro. In the season 1 finale, she becomes the sixth and only female member of the Tenkai Knights and an ally to the Corekai Soldiers.

Her core brick is Venetta (ヴェネッタ, Venetta).

== Corekai (Spectros) ==
=== Beag ===
Voiced by: Chafurin (Japanese); Kyle Hebert (English)

Commander Beagle (also known as Beag) (ビーグ, Bīgu) is the founder and commander of the Corekai Soldiers. Though intelligent, he is often confused by the Knights' otherworldly comments due to being unaware that they are not the original Tenkai Knights. He and his allies Kutor, Leinad, Senjo, and Tavox joined the Tenkai Knights in Robofusion, granting them the ability to use the Protojet and Airlancer Jet simultaneously. He frequently saves the Tenkai Knights in the Beast World due to them being powerless as humans; while in the Beast World, he changes from brick-looking to a robot, as all Tenkai Knights must be human. During the final battle, he travels to Earth to remove Granox and Slyger, being ready to sacrifice himself for the fortress.

=== Other members ===
Tavox
A gray and green Corekai Soldier.
Senjo
A gray and yellow Corekai Soldier.
Leinad
A white and red Corekai Soldier.
Kutor
A white and blue Corekai Soldier.
Corekai Cadets
The Corekai Cadets are foot cadets who work for Beag, Kutor, Leinad, Senjo, Tavox, and the Tenkai Knights.

== Corrupted (Veclipse) ==
=== Vilius ===
Voiced by: Yōsuke Akimoto (eps. 1–26), Nobuo Tobita (eps. 27–52) (Japanese); Crispin Freeman (English)

Vilius (ヴィリウス, Viriusu) is the main antagonist of the first season. He was once a Tenkai Knight, but turned against his former teammates after his energy became negative, leading the Corrupted Army as their warlord to obtain Tenkai Energy and awaken the Tenkai Dragon. He is an intelligent leader and deadly warrior, wearing armor that represents the Bat and wielding a trident. He can use Robofusion with the foot soldiers to turn into the Xenoship and can also assume Titan mode. Though defeated by Bravenwolf, he manages to resurrect himself and plans to invade Earth.

=== Granox ===
Voiced by: Hisao Ogawa (Japanese); Steve Blum (English)

Granox (ブライノックス, Burainokkusu; Brinox) is a powerful henchman who works under Vilius. His armor is seemingly based on a rhinoceros, and he wields a halberd or axe on a pole with a shield. Granox is usually a coward who avoids danger and seeks to exploit his opponents' weaknesses. During battles, the Tenkai Knights called him by many names, the most frequent being "Bucket Head." Granox was also the second robot to be sent to Earth from Quarton, using the newly pilfered teleporter.

=== Slyger ===
Voiced by: Atsushi Imaruoka (Japanese); Crispin Freeman (English)

Slyger (スライガー, Suraigā) is a powerful henchman who works under Vilius. He is armed with two claws and tiger-themed armor. He is sneaky and cunning, but is also brave unless it comes to the Tenkai Knights.

=== Other members ===
Rho (ブルータス, Burūtasu; Brutus)
Voiced by: Tomoyuki Shimura (Japanese); Kirk Thornton (English)
Rho is a member of the Corrupted. In the episode "Toxsa 2.0," he is empowered by Vilius and put under Granox's command. He assists in the capture and mind scan of Valorn. He has a robofusion called the Flying Darkwing Spector with three Hos. Rho is destroyed by Valorn, but later revived by Vilius.
Shadius (ヴィクリプス・コマンダー, Vikuripusu Komandā; Viclipse Commander)
A black and pale yellow Corrupted Soldier. In "Robofusion," he gains the ability to combine with Granox, Slyger, and a Sho to form the Sickle Ship.
Hos (トロックス, Torokkusu; Taurox)
The Hos are bull-like Mech Beasts serving the ground force for the Corrupted.
Sho (バルタックス, Barutakkusu; Baltax)
The Sho are flying dragon-like Mech Beasts serving the air force for the Corrupted.
Sky Griffin (デストロイ・グリフォン, Desutoroi Gurifon; Desroy Gryphon)
The Sky Griffins are griffin-like Mech Beasts serving as an alternative air force for the Corrupted. They can Robofuse with Slyger.
War Stallion (ウォー・ホース, Wō Hōsu; War Horse)
The War Stallions are horse-like Mech Beasts serving as an alternative ground force for the Corrupted. They can Robofuse with Granox.

== Guardians ==
The Guardians (ガーディアン, Gādian) are a group of Quarton beings who are the protectors of Quarton and named after the members of the Anemoi.

=== Boreas ===
Voiced by: Shigenori Sōya (Japanese); Steve Blum (English)

Boreas (ボレアース, Gādeian Boreāsu) is the guardian of the portal between Earth and Quarton, which is hidden under the basement of Mr. White's shop. He helps the Tenkai Knights revive the Tenkai Dragon to stop Villius. When Villius revives the dragon using the Black Dragon Key, Boreas and the other Guardians vote to intervene on Quarton.

=== Eurus ===
Voiced by: Hideyuki Umezu (Japanese); Benjamin Diskin (English)

Eurus (エウロス, Eurosu) (Note: In the Japanese version, Eurus is named Notus.) is a guardian from Quarton who is helping Gen and Beni, in their forms of Dromus and Venetta, find the Black Key. He feels that Boreas has upset the balance of Tenkai Energy, but he was pretending by thinking that he betrayed his fellow Guardians and realized that he was working for the Guardians by helping the Knights to defeat Villius.

=== Zephyrus ===
Voiced by: Junichi Yanagita (Japanese); Matthew Mercer (English)

Zephyrus (ゼピュロス, Zepyurosu) (Note: In the Japanese version, Zephyrus is named Eurus.) is one of the guardians. In episode 27, he is influenced by Vilius to revive him.

=== Notus ===
Voiced by: Michiko Neya (Japanese); Kyle Hebert (English)

Notus (ノトス, Notosu) (Note: In the Japanese version, Notus is named Zephyrus.) is one of the guardians.

== Beast World ==
=== Orangor ===
Voiced by: Misaki Kuno (Japanese); Benjamin Diskin (English)

Orangor is an ape-like robot from Beast World who impersonated Guren's cat Max.

=== Scorpidon ===
Voiced by: Michael Sorich

The Beast King and ruler of Beast World, who is a giant scorpion robot. Desperate for entertainment, he challenged the Tenkai Knights and Villus to a series of challenges so that they could go home, but keeps changing the rules to prevent them from leaving. It is not until after being defeated in combat that Scorpidon is satisfied and sends them back to their world.

== Other characters ==
=== Humans ===
Mr. Nash
Voiced by: Tomoyuki Shimura (Japanese); Steve Blum (English)
Guren's widowed father and a businessman.
Mrs. Nash
Guren's late mother. She is only seen in Guren's family photos.
Mr. Jones
Voiced by: Hiroshi Tsuchida (Japanese); Todd Haberkorn (English)
Ceylan's father and a businessman.
Mrs. Jones
Voiced by: Mika Kanda (Japanese); Kate Higgins (English)
Ceylan's mother.
Ms. Finwick
Voiced by: Michiko Neya (Japanese); Colleen O'Shaughnessey (English)
Guren, Ceylan, and Gen's history teacher.
Wakamei Dalton (亀山ワカメ, Kameyama Wakame)
Voiced by: Natsumi Takamori (Japanese); Kate Higgins (English)
Toxsa's older sister. She works as a waitress at her family's Turtle diner. In "Extreme Titan", she learns about his secret but pretends to know that he was playing part in a video game.
Mrs. Dalton
Voiced by: Ai Takanashi (Japanese); Mary Elizabeth McGlynn (English)
Wakamei and Toxsa's mother. She owns the Turtle diner with her husband.
Mr. Dalton
Voiced by: Hiroki Yamada (Japanese); Benjamin Diskin (English)
Wakamei and Toxsa's father. He works as a chef at the family's Turtle diner that he and his wife own.
Kiro Mason (黄色 蜂須賀, Hachisuka Kiro; Kiro Hachisuka)
Voiced by: Maasa Kobayashi (Japanese); Laura Bailey (English)
Chooki's younger cousin (sister in the Japanese version). She later becomes Beni's best friend.
Roberto (アキラ, Akira; Akira)
Voiced by: Sho Saotome (Japanese); Brian Beacock (English)
A student in the same history class as Guren, Ceylan and Gen.

=== Legendary beasts ===
Tenkai Dragon (テンカイドラゴン)
A gigantic and powerful dragon serving as the neutral defense system of the planet Quarton. It was once under the possession of Vilius and used to eliminate targets and Corekai armies. However, it was defeated and sealed into several fragments by the Tenkai Knights, with the White Dragon Key or the Black Dragon Key being required to unseal it. The team who commands the dragon depends on which key is used to awaken it, with the Black Key resulting in evil and the White Key resulting in good. When Villus returns, he steals the dragon cubes from the knights to revive it. However, because he did not use the Dragon Keys to revive the dragon, it became unstable and was split by Dromus' attack into five white (good) and black (bad) cubes. The white cubes are absorbed by the Tenkai Knights and Dromus and the black cubes are absorbed by Villus, granting them their Elemental Titan modes. It is later revealed that they can use the dragon cubes they absorbed to each summon a separate dragon, a good dragon for the Tenkai Knights and an evil dragon for Vilius.
Tenkai Wolf
A powerful beast hidden within the Tenkai Fortress, the Tenkai Wolf was summoned after the crest Bravenwolf received from Orangor activated. It granted Bravenwolf a new form and powers and fought alongside him to defeat Villius.
