= McLuckie =

McLuckie or MacLuckie is a surname. Notable people with the surname include:

- George McLuckie (1931–2011), Scottish footballer
- Jasper McLuckie (1878–1924), Scottish footballer
- Jimmy McLuckie (1908–1986), Scottish footballer
- Kirsty McLuckie, Scottish journalist
- Steven McLuckie (born 1973), Australian rules footballer
