= Glynn =

Glynn may refer to:

== Places ==
- Glynn, County Antrim, a village and townland in Northern Ireland, UK
- Glynn, Louisiana, an unincorporated community in the United States
- Glynn, U.S. Virgin Islands, US
- Glynn County, Georgia, United States

=== Facilities and structures ===
- Glynn House, England, UK
- Glynn railway station, serving Glynn in County Antrim, Northern Ireland, UK

== People ==
- Glynn (surname)
- Glynn Davis (born 1991), American baseball player
- Glynn Harrison (born 1954), American football player

=== Fictional characters ===
- Glynn, a character from Thomas & Friends

== Other uses ==
- Glynn Academy, a high school in Brunswick, Georgia, United States
- Glynn Motorsports, a racing team

== See also ==
- Glynne (disambiguation)
- Glyn (disambiguation)
