= McLucas =

McLucas is a surname. Notable people with the surname include:

- Alan McLucas, Australian Paralympic athlete
- Jan McLucas (born 1958), Australian politician
- John L. McLucas (1920–2002), United States Secretary of the Air Force
- Lonnie McLucas, Black Panther Party member
