= McLuhan =

McLuhan is a surname. Notable people with the surname include:

- Eric McLuhan (1941–2018), Canadian writer
- Marshall McLuhan (1911–1980), Canadian educator, philosopher and scholar

== See also ==
- Luhan (disambiguation)
