= John Glynne =

John Glynne may refer to:

- Sir John Glynne (judge) (1602–1666), lawyer and member of parliament for Caernarvon, Westminster, and Caernarvonshire
- Sir John Glynne, 6th Baronet (1712–1777), member of parliament for Flintshire and Flint

== See also ==
- Glynne baronets
- John Glynn (1722–1779), English lawyer and MP
