= Glenn =

Glenn may refer to:

== Name or surname ==
- Glenn (name), including a list of people with the given name or surname

== Cultivars ==
- Glenn (mango)
- a 6-row barley variety

== Places ==
In the United States:

- Glenn, California
- Glenn County, California
- Glenn, Georgia, a settlement in Heard County
- Glenn, Illinois
- Glenn, Michigan
- Glenn, Missouri
- Glenn Highway in Alaska

== Organizations ==
- Glenn Research Center, a NASA center in Cleveland, Ohio

== Music ==
• "Glenn" a song by Slint from Untitled Slint EP

== See also ==
- New Glenn, a heavy-lift orbital launch vehicle
- Glen, a valley
- Glen (disambiguation)
