= William Glen (geologist) =

American geologist (1932–2025)

- Born: March 14, 1932; New York City, U.S.
- Died: August 13, 2025 (aged 93)
- Known for: Biostratigraphy; history of Earth sciences
- Scientific career
- Fields: Geology, historian

William Glen (March 14, 1932 – August 13, 2025) was an American geologist and historian of science. He was editor-at-large at the Stanford University Press, a visiting scientist/historian at the U.S. Geological Survey, Menlo Park, a visiting scholar at Stanford University in California, and a professor at the College of San Mateo.

Glen died on August 13, 2025, at the age of 93.

== Selected bibliography ==
- William Glen, 1970, Exercises in Physical Geology, W.C. Brown Publishing Co., 154 pp.
- William Glen, 1975, Continental Drift and Plate Tectonics Charles E. Merrill Publishing Co., Columbus, Ohio, 188 pp. ISBN 0675087996
- William Glen, 1985, Continental Drift and Plate Tectonics. Second Edition, Published by Geo-Resources Associates, San Mateo, Ca., 200 pp. ISBN 0675087996
- William Glen, 1982, The Road to Jaramillo: Critical Years of the Revolution in Earth Science Stanford University Press, Stanford, Ca., 459 pp. ISBN 0804711194
- William Glen (ed.) 1994, The Mass-Extinction Debates: How Science Works in a Crisis Stanford University Press, Stanford, Ca., 371 pp. ISBN 0804722854
- William Glen, 1959 Pliocene and Lower Pleistocene of the Western Part of the San Francisco Peninsula, University of California Publications in the Geological Sciences, University of California Press, 36, 2: 147-198, plates 15-17, 5 text figs., 1959.

== Notes ==
- Learning Stewards Interview: (See "learningstewards" channel on YouTube). Dr. Glen discusses his life's work as a historian of science.
