= USS Lewis B. Puller (ESB-3) =

US Navy expeditionary mobile base vessel

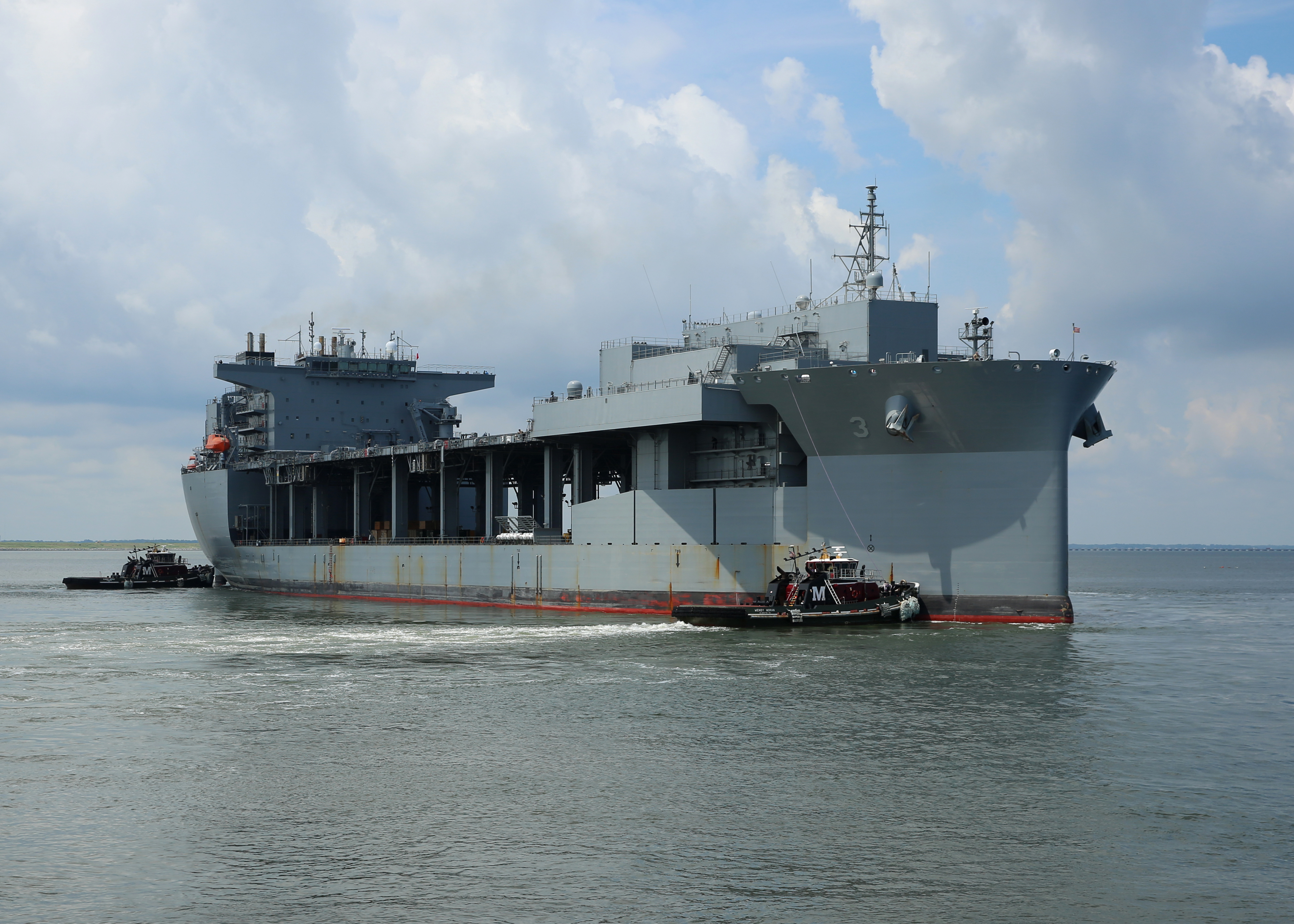
- Lewis B. Puller departing for its first operational deployment in 2017

History

United States
- Namesake: Lewis B. Puller, Sr.
- Awarded: February 2012
- Builder: NASSCO – San Diego, California
- Cost: $650 million
- Laid down: 5 November 2013
- Launched: 6 November 2014
- Christened: 7 February 2015
- Acquired: 12 June 2015
- Commissioned: 17 August 2017
- Identification: IMO number: 9656008; MMSI number: 369464000; Callsign: NPUL
- Motto: Courage, Leadership, Duty
- Status: in active service
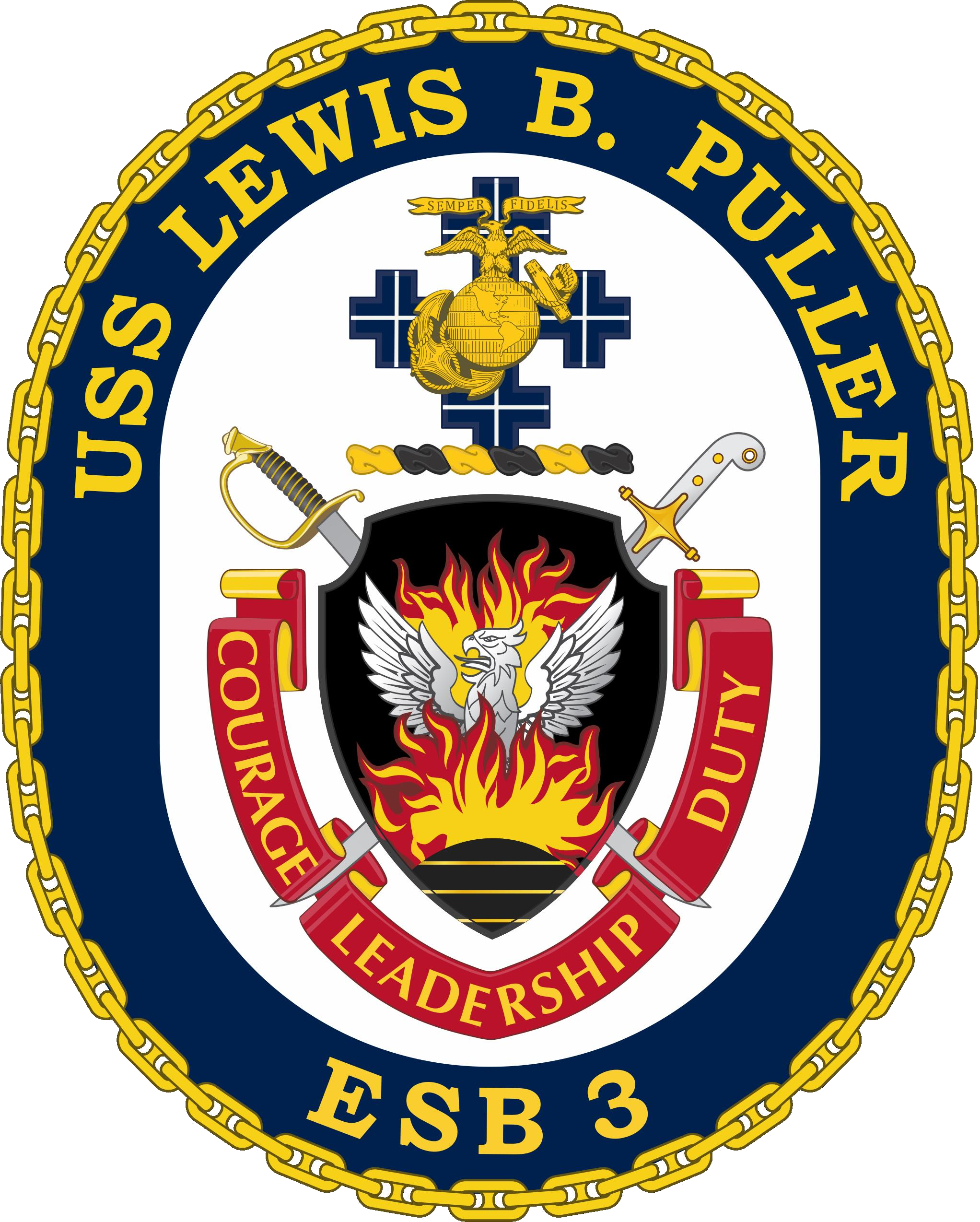
- Badge

General characteristics
- Displacement: Approx. 90,000 long tons (100,000 short tons) fully loaded
- Length: 764 ft (233 m) (Note: NavSourve.org lists the overall length as 785 ft (239 m).)
- Beam: 164 ft (50 m)
- Draft: 25.5 ft (7.8 m)
- Installed power: Diesel-electric
- Propulsion: Integrated power systems; Two (2) propellers
- Speed: 15 knots (28 km/h; 17 mph)
- Range: 9,500 nautical miles (17,600 km; 10,900 mi)
- Boats & landing craft carried: Accommodation barge (298 mission-related personnel max.)
- Complement: 19 officers, 231 enlisted
- Armament: 12 x .50 caliber machine gun stations
- Aircraft carried: Up to 4 CH-53 heavy-lift transport helicopters (Note: MV-22 tilt-rotor transport aircraft are under consideration. See Embarked aircraft section of this article for details.)
- Aviation facilities: Helicopter landing deck and hangar
- Notes: Afloat forward staging base variant

USS Lewis B. Puller (ESB-3), (formerly USNS Lewis B. Puller (T-ESB-3), and (T-MLP-3/T-AFSB-1) prior to that) is the first purpose-built expeditionary mobile base vessel (previously classified as a mobile landing platform, and then as an afloat forward staging base) for the United States Navy, and the second ship to be named in honor of Chesty Puller. The lead ship in her class of expeditionary mobile bases, she is also a sub-variant of the Montford Point-class expeditionary transfer docks. Lewis B. Puller replaced USS Ponce with the U.S. Fifth Fleet in the Persian Gulf in late 2017.

Lewis B. Puller was commissioned on 17 August 2017 in Bahrain, with her prefix changing from USNS to USS and her hull designation changing from T-ESB-3 to ESB-3.

== Background ==
The Lewis B. Puller class of expeditionary mobile base ships differ from the United States Navy's first two expeditionary transfer dock support vessels, Montford Point and John Glenn. These two ships act as floating bases or transfer stations that can be positioned off the target area. Lewis B. Puller and Hershel "Woody" Williams serve as expeditionary mobile bases to support low-intensity missions. This allows more expensive, high-value amphibious warfare ships and surface combatant warships to be re-tasked for more demanding operational missions for the U.S. Navy. These ESB variants operate in the Middle East and the Pacific Ocean.

Lewis B. Puller was initially operated by the Military Sealift Command with the prefix "USNS" and a crew of Department of the Navy civilian mariners. She replaced USS Ponce, the U.S. Navy's interim AFSB support ship.

=== Namesake ===
Lewis B. Puller (ESB-3) is the second ship named after Marine Corps Lieutenant General Lewis Burwell "Chesty" Puller. The first was USS Lewis B. Puller (FFG-23), an Oliver Hazard Perry-class frigate. A distinguished combat veteran of the Banana Wars, World War II and the Korean War, Puller is the most decorated individual in the history of the United States Marine Corps.

=== Ship re-designation ===
On 4 September 2015, U.S. Secretary of the Navy Ray Mabus announced a new ship designator: "E" for expeditionary support. Mobile Landing Platforms (MLPs) will be designated Expeditionary Transfer Docks, or ESDs; and the Afloat Forward Staging Base (AFSB) variant of the MLP will be called Expeditionary Mobile Bases, or ESBs. The new designation followed a 31 August 2015 memorandum sent to Mabus by Chief of Naval Operations Admiral Jonathan Greenert.

== Design features ==
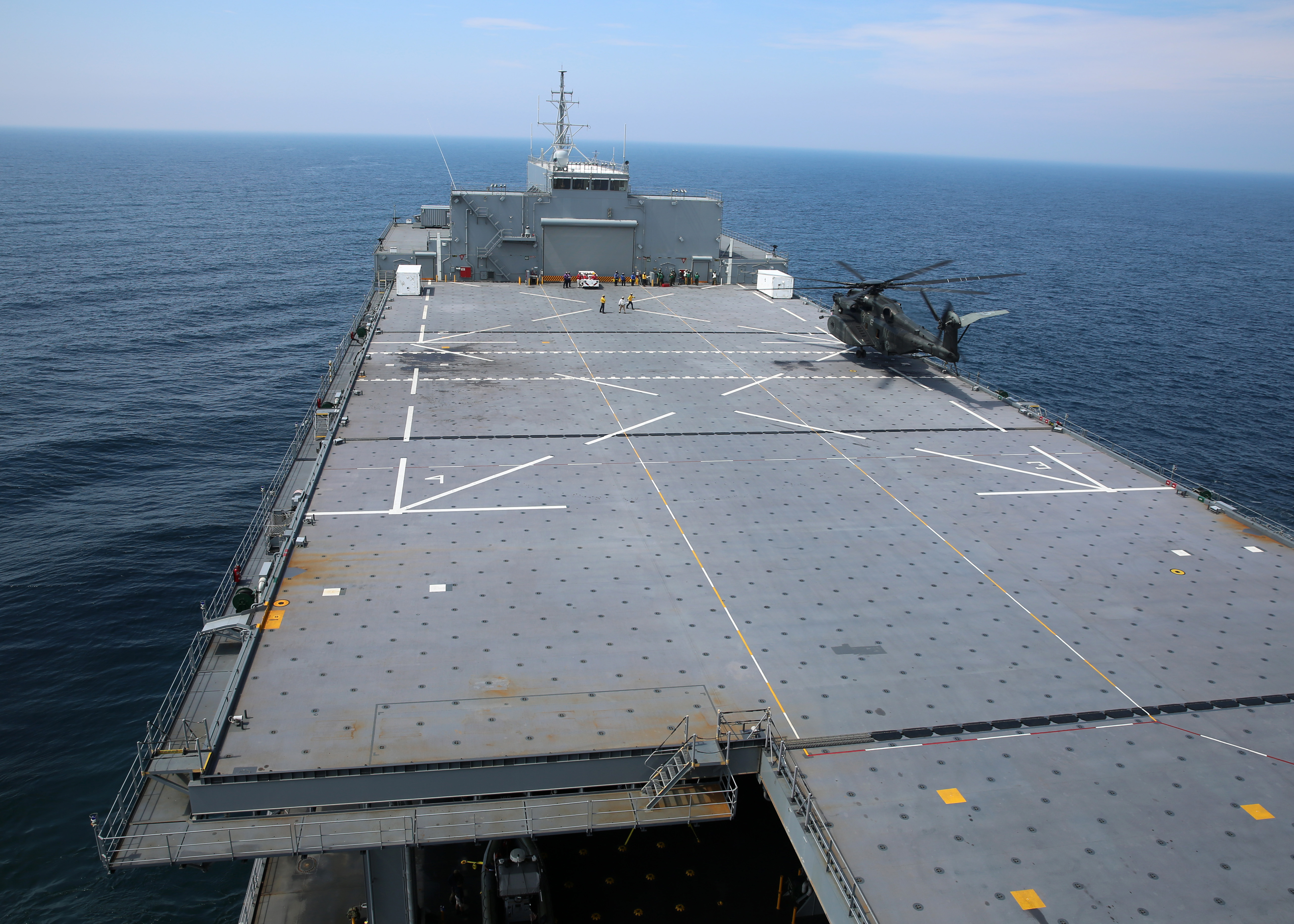
A Sikorsky MH-53E Sea Dragon helicopter lands on Lewis B. Puller's flight deck in June 2016

The design of Lewis B. Puller is based on the hull of the civilian Alaska-class oil tanker. Lewis B. Puller can be outfitted with support facilities for her minesweeping, special operations, and other expeditionary missions. An accommodation barge can be carried to support up to 298 more people, including special-operations teams.

Lewis B. Puller's flight deck has landing spots for four heavy-lift transport CH-53 helicopters, plus deck space for two more MH-53s. The ship has a helicopter hangar, an ordnance storage magazine, underway replenishment facilities, and deck space for mission-related equipment storage, including up to four Mk 105 minesweeping hydrofoil sleds.

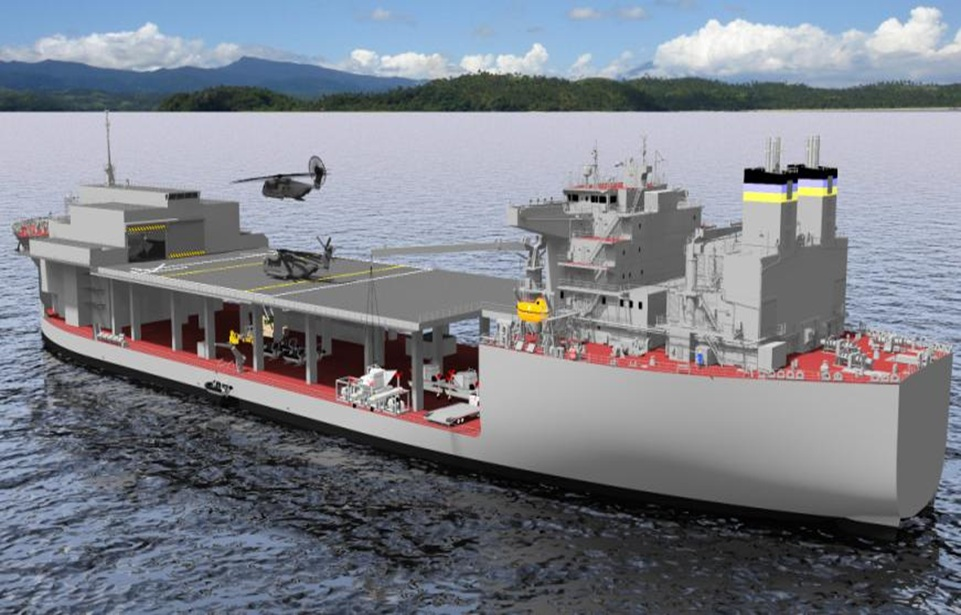
Artist's impression of Lewis B. Puller

GE Power Conversion will provide complete electric power, propulsion, and vessel automation systems for all ESB/ESD ships. This integrated power system (IPS) will also involve the ship's tandem propulsion motor powered by variable-frequency drives, harmonic filters, and high-voltage switchboards.

Unlike the ESDs that lower the entire ship until their boat decks are awash, ESBs use cranes to raise and lower small boats of up to 11 metric tons (12 short tons) to the water from their mission deck.

Lewis B. Puller is the first non-combatant ship equipped with the Navy's N-30 class passive fire protection system.

=== Embarked aircraft ===
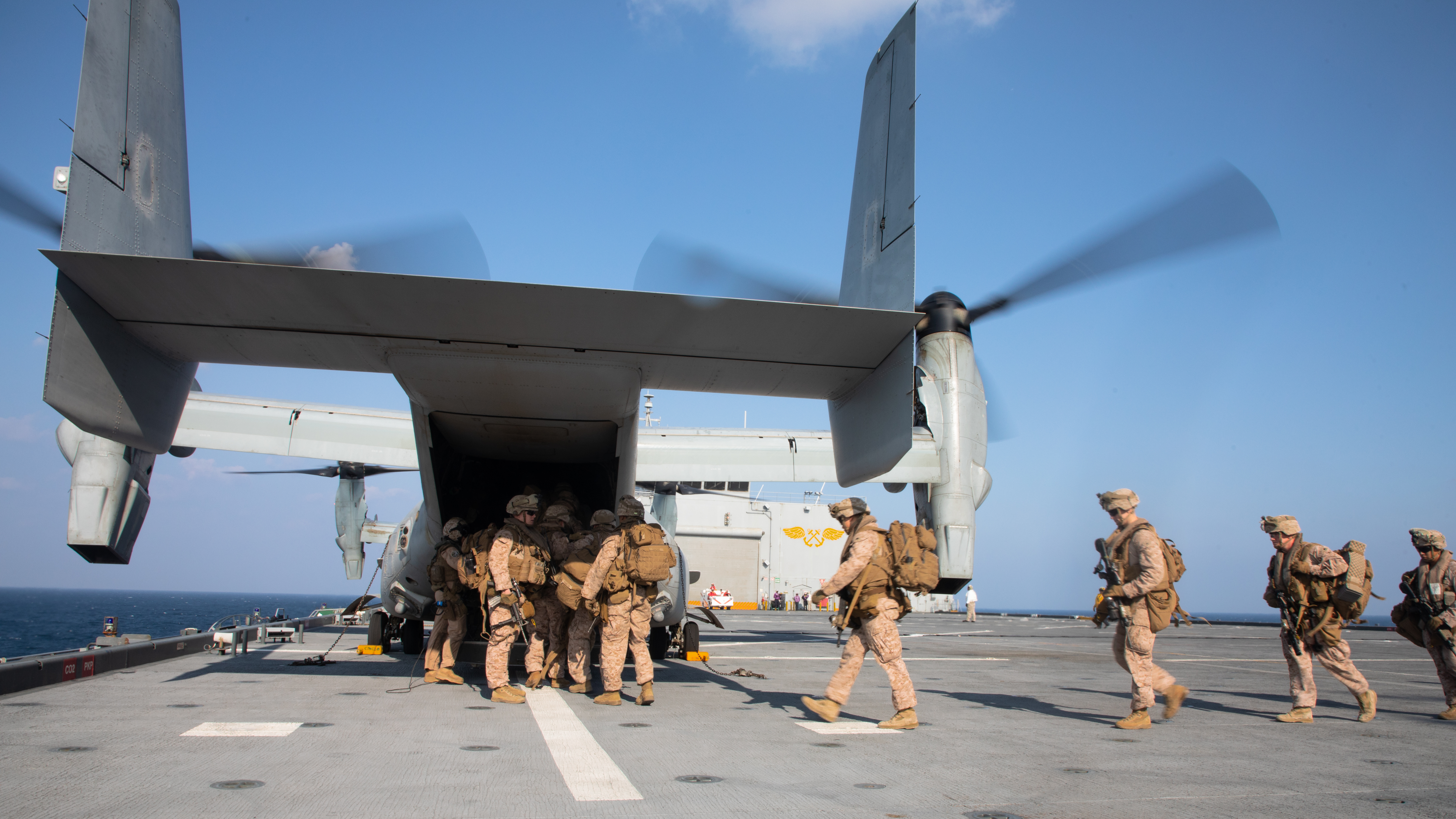
Marines load onto an MV-22 Osprey in the Persian Gulf in 2019

The ship is equipped to support United States Air Force CV-22s on special ops missions. Feasibility tests began in 2014 and the capability was added before the ship's 2017 maiden deployment.

The testing and certification of MH-53E helicopters for minesweeping operations from ESB support ships began in fiscal year 2016.

The F-35B STOVL strike fighter does not fly from ESBs because its exhaust heat might damage the deck, Captain Henry Stevens, the head of NAVSEA's Strategic and Theater Sealift program, said on 16 January 2014.

== History ==
=== Construction ===
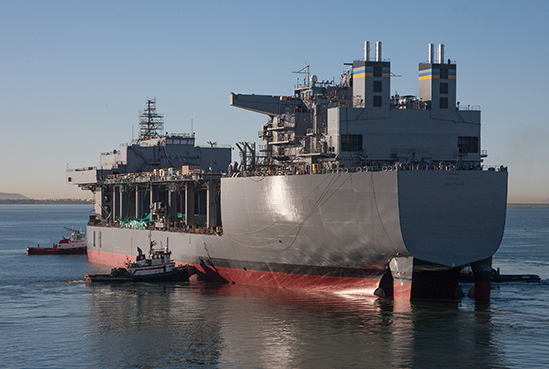
Post-launch (6 November 2014)

The United States Navy ordered T-ESB-3 in February 2012 as part of the Fiscal Year 2013 appropriation for the U.S. Department of Defense via the National Defense Sealift Fund (NDSF).

The keel-laying ceremony for Lewis B. Puller took place at the General Dynamics NASSCO shipyard in San Diego, California, on 5 November 2013. The keel of Lewis B. Puller was authenticated by Elizabeth Glueck, the wife of Lieutenant General Kenneth J. Glueck, Jr., the commanding general of the Marine Corps Combat Development Command. Mrs. Glueck welded her initials onto a steel plate that will be permanently affixed to the ship, remaining a part of Lewis B. Puller throughout her service life.

Lewis B. Puller was launched and floated-off at the General Dynamics NASSCO shipyard on 6 November 2014. The launching dock was slowly flooded with water until she could freely float by herself. The ship was christened on 7 February 2015, and she was delivered on 12 June 2015.

Lewis B. Puller set sail from San Diego to Norfolk via Cape Horn, arriving 13 October 2015 to begin her testing and evaluation phase. The ship is configured for minesweeping support but is also under consideration to support special operations forces (SOF) missions. Lewis B. Puller joined the U.S. Fifth Fleet in the Persian Gulf in late 2016 or early 2017.

On 14 January 2016, the Secretary of the Navy announced that Lewis B. Puller's sister-ship would be named Hershel "Woody" Williams during a ceremony in Charleston, West Virginia. Hershel "Woody" Williams was commissioned on 7 March 2020.

=== Deployment ===
On 10 July 2017, Lewis B. Puller left from Naval Station Norfolk for her first operational deployment to the U.S. 5th Fleet's area of operations. The ship is permanently deployed overseas; maintenance, repairs and crew swaps will take place in theater.

=== Commissioning ===
Lewis B. Puller was commissioned on 17 August 2017 at Khalifa bin Salman Port in Al Hidd, Bahrain, with her prefix changing from USNS to USS, becoming the first U.S.-built ship to be commissioned outside the United States. The change was required by the Law of Armed Conflict, which says that only a warship may do certain activities, such as mine-countermeasures and special operations staging. Her hull classification also changed from T-ESB-3 to ESB-3, indicating she was to be crewed by U.S. Navy sailors rather than civilian mariners.

=== Operations ===
Lewis B. Puller trained with the America amphibious ready group (ARG), during the military exercise Alligator Dagger 2017 to explore the potential of the ESB platform to support such operations.

In November 2018, a detachment from Helicopter Mine Countermeasures Squadron 15 deployed on Lewis B. Puller for training.

In March 2020, United States Army AH-64 Apache attack helicopters conducted deck landing qualifications with Lewis B. Puller. While conducting this exercise, on 15 April 2020, 11 Iranian patrol vessels started circling Lewis B. Puller and surrounding US Navy and Coast Guard vessels. The boats got within 50 yards (46 m) of the ship and would not leave despite repeated radio warnings and noise makers. The incident lasted for an hour until the Iranian vessels pulled away. Video of the incident was posted by the US Navy.

On 1 December 2022, Lewis B. Puller interdicted and boarded the stateless dhow Marwan 1 and seized weapons and ammunition suspected of being smuggled by Iran to Yemen, including over one million rounds of 7.62x54mm ammunition. The ammunition was then later sent by the United States government as aid to Ukraine.

At a Pentagon press briefing on 24 April 2023, a spokesperson stated that USS Truxtun was "... off the coast of Sudan, near the Port of Sudan. It will stay there awaiting further orders should it be needed to support. Also, en route is the USS Puller."

On 11 January 2024, Navy SEALs operating from Lewis B. Puller seized Iranian-made ballistic missile and cruise missile components from a ship traveling off the coast of Somalia. Two SEALs went missing in the operation, and after eleven days of unsuccessful search and rescue, followed by search and recover, they were presumed dead by the Navy. The dhow was sunk by the US military subsequent to its capture.
