= USS Lewis B. Puller =

USS Lewis B. Puller may refer to:

- USS Lewis B. Puller (FFG-23) was an Oliver Hazard Perry-class frigate launched 1980 and transferred to Egypt 1998.
- USS Lewis B. Puller (ESB-3) is the first expeditionary mobile base (ESB) variant of expeditionary transfer dock ships, launched in 2014 and in active service
