= JGHS =

JGHS may refer to:

- James Gillespie's High School, Edinburgh, Scotland
- John Gray High School, George Town, Grand Cayman, Cayman Islands
- John Glenn High School (disambiguation)
- Taipei Municipal Jianguo High School, Taipei, Taiwan

== See also ==
- JGH (disambiguation)
