= MLP-3 =

MLP-3 may refer to:

- Mobile Launch Platform 3, formerly used by NASA's Shuttle program
- USS Lewis B. Puller (ESB-3), formerly known as T-MLP-3
