= AFSB =

AFSB may refer to:

- Afloat Forward Staging Base, U.S. Navy
- Air Force Studies Board, National Academy of Sciences
- Air Force Selection Board, Indian Air Force
