= Yinmahu =

People's Liberation Army Navy vessel

History

China
- Name: Yinmahu (饮马湖)
- Namesake: Donghai Island (Previous name); Yinma Lake (Current name)
- Builder: Huangpu Shipyard
- Completed: 2015
- Commissioned: July 10, 2015
- In service: July 10, 2015
- Renamed: From Donghaidao (东海岛)
- Identification: 834 (Formerly 868)

General characteristics
- Class & type: Type 711 semi-submersible ship
- Displacement: 20,000 long tons (20,000 t)
- Length: 175.5 m (575 ft 9 in)
- Beam: 32.4 m (106 ft 4 in)
- Speed: 14 knots (26 km/h; 16 mph)
- Boats & landing craft carried: 1 × daughter boat; 1 × LCAC (well deck) or 3 tugboats
- Electronic warfare & decoys: None
- Aviation facilities: Deck can be used as a helipad

Yinmahu (NATO reporting name Modified Hansa Sonderberg class) is a semi-submersible ship of the People's Liberation Army Navy.

== Design ==
According to state publications, the Yinmahu's deck measures over 100 meters in length and 30 meters in width, and can submerge more than six meters underwater while the other parts of the ship remain afloat.

== History ==
In 2022, the ship was photographed transporting an amphibious hovercraft.

In 2023, the ship conducted its first night-time operations training.

== See also ==
- Expeditionary Transfer Dock
