= USNS Montford Point =

Ship built in 2013

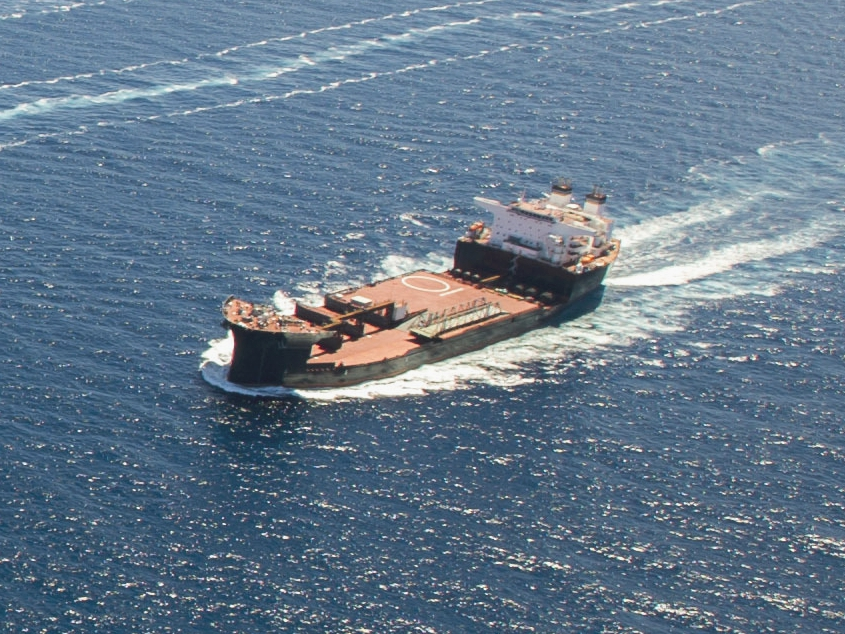
- USNS Montford Point (T-ESD-1) underway in July 2014

History

United States
- Name: Montford Point
- Namesake: Montford Point Camp, North Carolina
- Owner: Military Sealift Command
- Ordered: 27 May 2011
- Builder: National Steel and Shipbuilding Company
- Laid down: 19 January 2012
- Launched: 13 November 2012
- In service: 14 May 2013
- Identification: IMO number: 9647514; MMSI number: 369462000; Callsign: NMFP
- Status: Active, Reduced Operating Status

General characteristics
- Class & type: Expeditionary Transfer Dock
- Displacement: 34,500 tonnes
- Length: 765 ft (233 m)
- Speed: 20 knots (37 km/h; 23 mph)
- Range: 9,000 nmi (17,000 km; 10,000 mi)

USNS Montford Point (T-ESD-1), (formerly T-MLP-1), the lead ship of her class of Expeditionary Transfer Docks (ESD), is a ship named in honor of African American Marine Corps recruits who trained at Montford Point Camp, North Carolina, from 1942 to 1949. After $115 million was allocated for long-lead time material and advanced design efforts, in late 2010 General Dynamics's National Steel and Shipbuilding Company was awarded the contract, worth approximately $500 million, to build the first of three planned vessels.

== Design ==
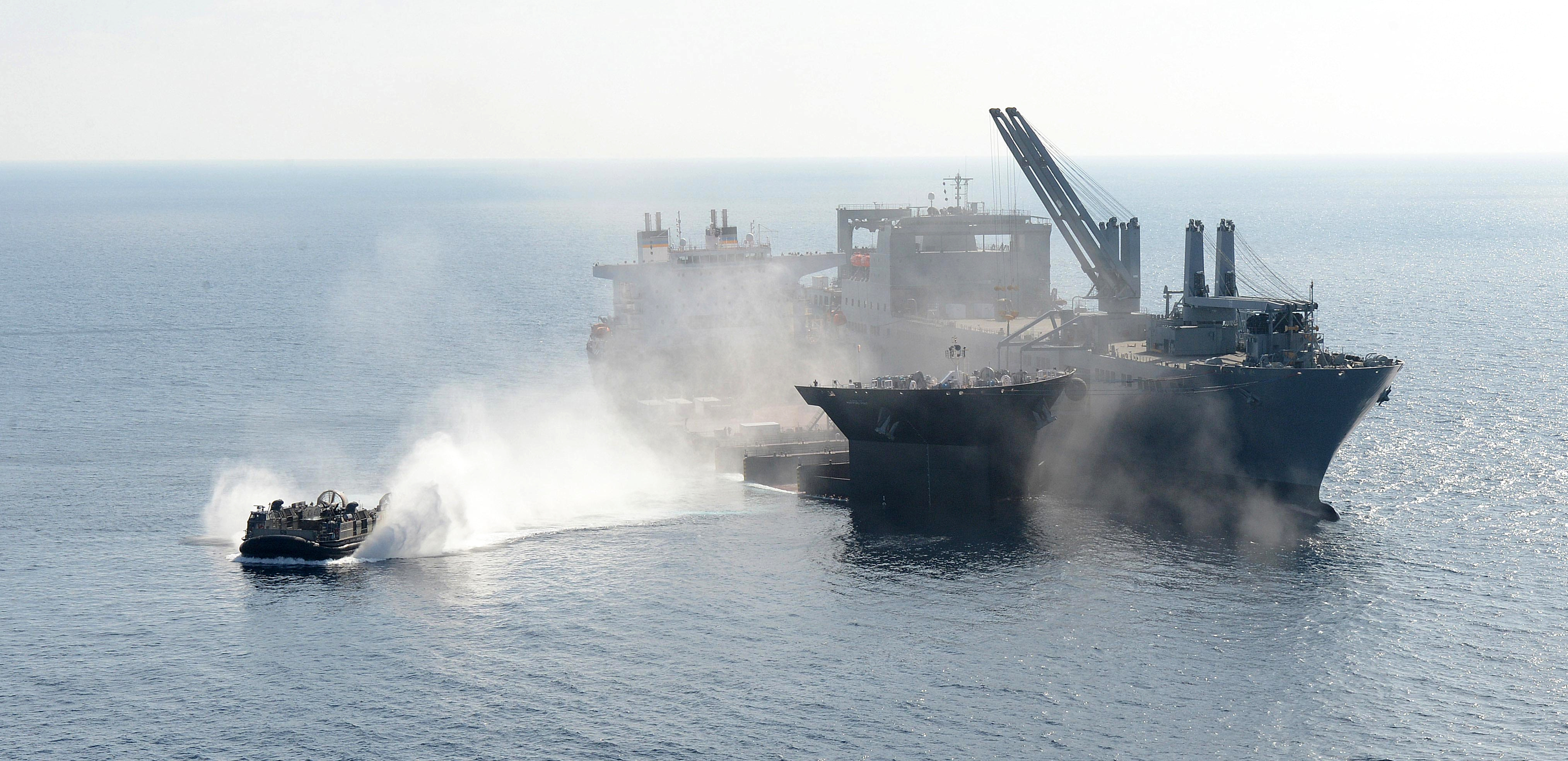
A LCAC after launching from Montford Point.

The Expeditionary Transfer Dock is a new concept, part of the Maritime Prepositioning Force of the future. To control costs, the ships will not be built to combat vessel standards and are designed primarily to support three military hovercraft (such as the Landing Craft Air Cushion), vehicle staging with a sideport ramp and large mooring fenders. A decision was made to eliminate helicopter capability and ship-to-ship transfer of heavy equipment. An auxiliary support ship, Montford Point's role would be a seagoing pier for friendly forces in case accessibility to onshore bases are denied. Such flexibility would be useful following natural disasters and for supporting US Marines once they are ashore. The ESD supports a vehicle staging area, side port ramp, large mooring fenders, and up to three landing craft air cushioned vessel lanes.

The ship's engines are of British design and construction. Power conversion company Converteam was selected as the supplier of Integrated Power Systems with the award of an additional contract to design and supply the electric power, propulsion and vessel automation system.

== Construction ==
Montford Point's keel was laid down in San Diego, California, on 19 January 2012. The honoree of the keel-laying ceremony was Mrs. Pat Mills, wife of U.S. Marine Corps Lieutenant General Richard P. Mills.

Montford Point completed its first float out operation at the General Dynamics NASSCO shipyard in San Diego, California, on 13 November 2012. Montford Point was christened in March 2013, successfully completed builder's sea trials on March 20, and has been delivered to the Military Sealift Command's Maritime Prepositioning Force in May 2013. The Navy accepted delivery of the vessel from General Dynamics-NASSCO on May 14, in San Diego, California. Operational use was scheduled to start in fiscal year 2015. As an ESD, the ship is expected to come under the command of the United States Navy's Military Sealift Command, and thus will not be commissioned into the Navy (hence her designation prefix, "USNS"). Most of the civilian mariner positions - both entry-level & licensed - will be filled with members of the Seafarers International Union's Government Service Division and the American Maritime Officers union.

== History ==
On 13 June 2014, the Montford Point successfully completed LCAC interface tests off the coast of Camp Pendleton. LCACs moved Amphibious Assault Vehicles from the base and offloaded them onto the ship, demonstrating the ESD's ability to facilitate at-sea transfers to serve as a mobile seabase.

Montford Point participated in RIMPAC 2014.

Montford Point began a series of Post-Delivery Tests and Trials (PDT&T) events beginning in April 2014 that took place over several months, which included an Initial Operational Test and Evaluation (IOT&E) end-to-end event to determine operational effectiveness and the week-long Pacific Horizon 2015 humanitarian assistance and disaster relief exercise. The tests demonstrated her ability to interface with cargo ships, including the LMSR using the Vehicle Transfer Ramp (VTR) and the JHSV with its vehicle ramp, and the Improved Navy Lighterage System to offload equipment onto it to be moved to shore by LCACs, reducing the need for use of a foreign port. Initial Operating Capability (IOC) is expected in April 2015.

== Ship re-designation ==
Effective 4 September 2015, U.S. Secretary of the Navy Ray Mabus officially announced the creation of a new ship designation, "E" for expeditionary support. Joint High Speed Vessel (JHSV) will be called Expeditionary Fast Transport, or EPF; the Mobile Landing Platform (MLP) will be called Expeditionary Transfer Dock, or ESD; and the Afloat Forward Staging Base (AFSB) variant of the MLP will be called Expeditionary Mobile Base, or ESB. The new designation was pursuant to a memorandum sent to Secretary Mabus from Chief of Naval Operations Admiral Jonathan Greenert dated 31 August 2015.
