= USNS John Glenn =

Expeditionary Mobile Base for the US Navy

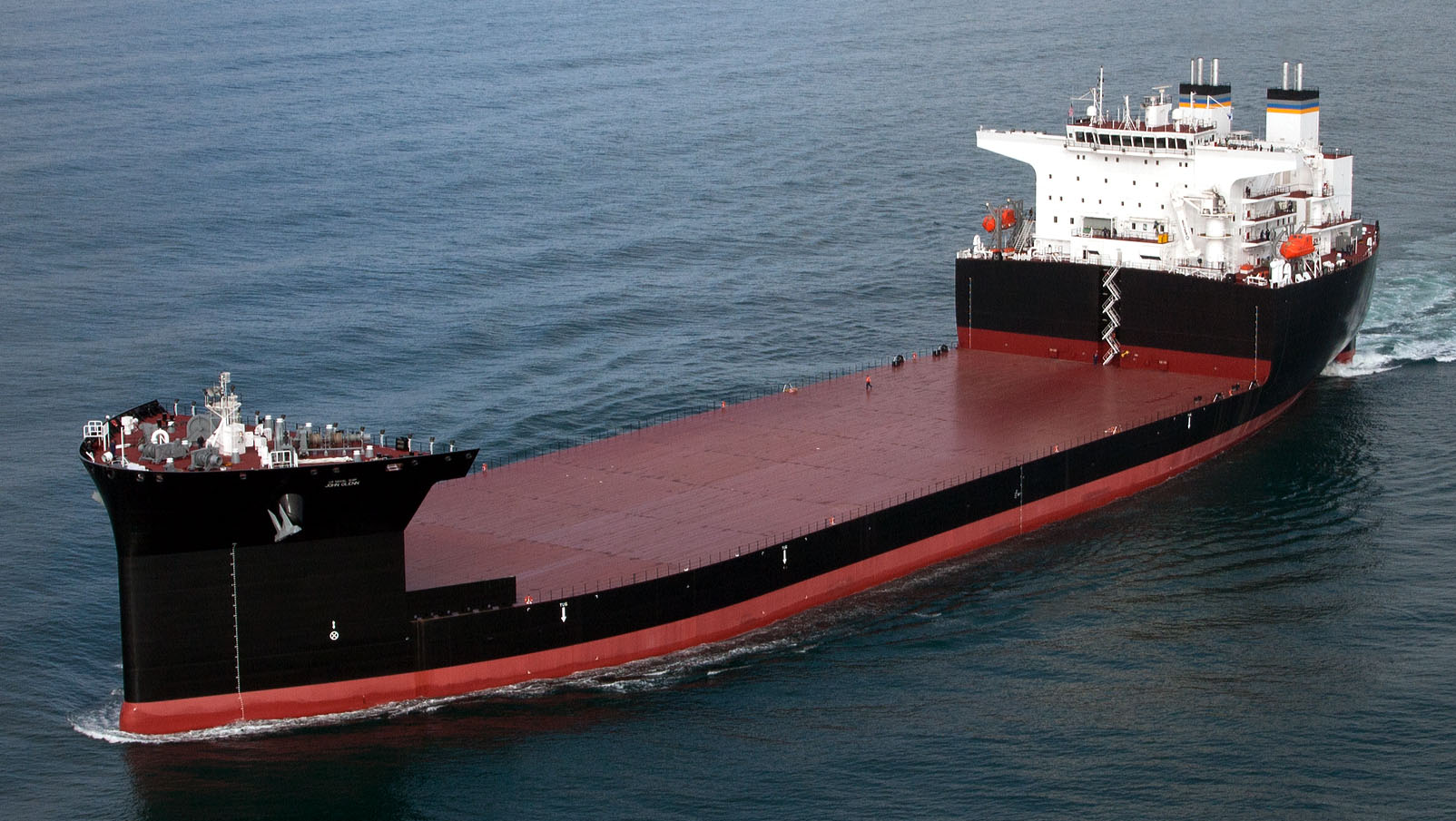
- USNS John Glenn underway in January 2014

History

United States
- Namesake: John Glenn
- Owner: Military Sealift Command
- Ordered: 27 May 2011
- Builder: NASSCO
- Laid down: 17 April 2012
- Launched: 15 September 2013
- In service: 12 March 2014
- Identification: IMO number: 9647526; MMSI number: 369463000; Callsign: NJHG
- Status: Active, Reduced Operating Status

General characteristics
- Class & type: Montford Point-class expeditionary transfer dock
- Displacement: 34,500 tonnes
- Length: 765 ft (233 m)
- Speed: 20 knots (37 km/h; 23 mph)
- Range: 9,000 nmi (17,000 km; 10,000 mi)

USNS John Glenn (T-ESD-2), (formerly MLP-2) is a United States Navy Expeditionary Transfer Dock ship named in honor of John Glenn, a Naval Aviator, retired United States Marine Corps colonel, veteran of World War II and the Korean War, astronaut, and United States senator.

== Design ==
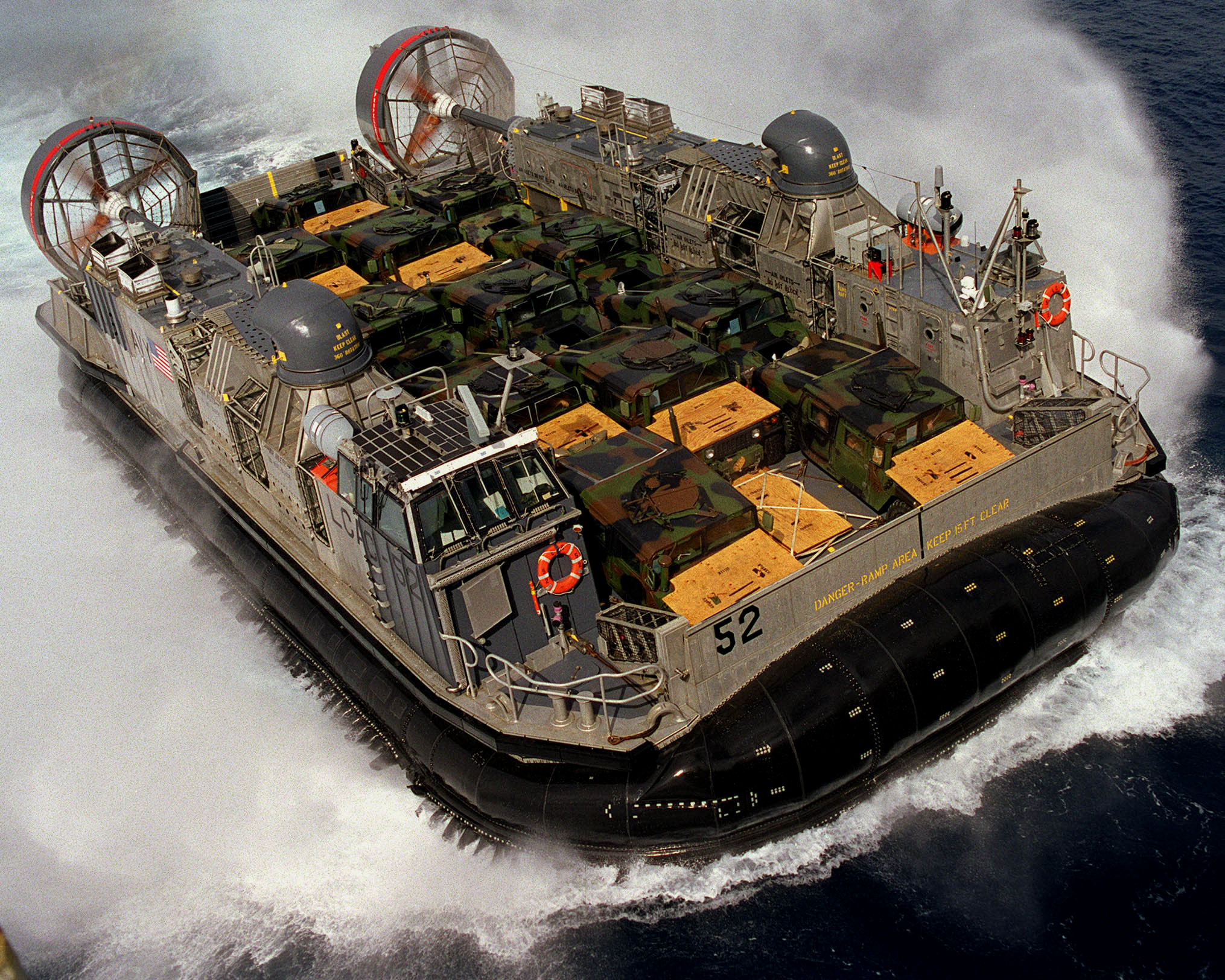
A US Navy Landing Craft Air Cushion (LCAC)

The Expeditionary Transfer Dock is a new concept, part of the Maritime Prepositioning Force of the future. To control costs, the ships will not be built to combat vessel standards and are designed primarily to support three military hovercraft (such as the Landing Craft Air Cushion (LCAC)), vehicle staging with a sideport ramp and large mooring fenders. A decision was made to eliminate helicopter capability and ship-to-ship transfer of heavy equipment.

The propulsion motors are of British design and build. Power conversion company Converteam was selected as the supplier of Integrated Power Systems with the award of an additional contract to design and supply the electric power, propulsion and vessel automation system.

As an auxiliary support ship, her role would be a seagoing pier for friendly forces in case accessibility to onshore bases is denied. Such flexibility would be useful following natural disasters and for supporting US Marines once they are ashore.

== Construction ==
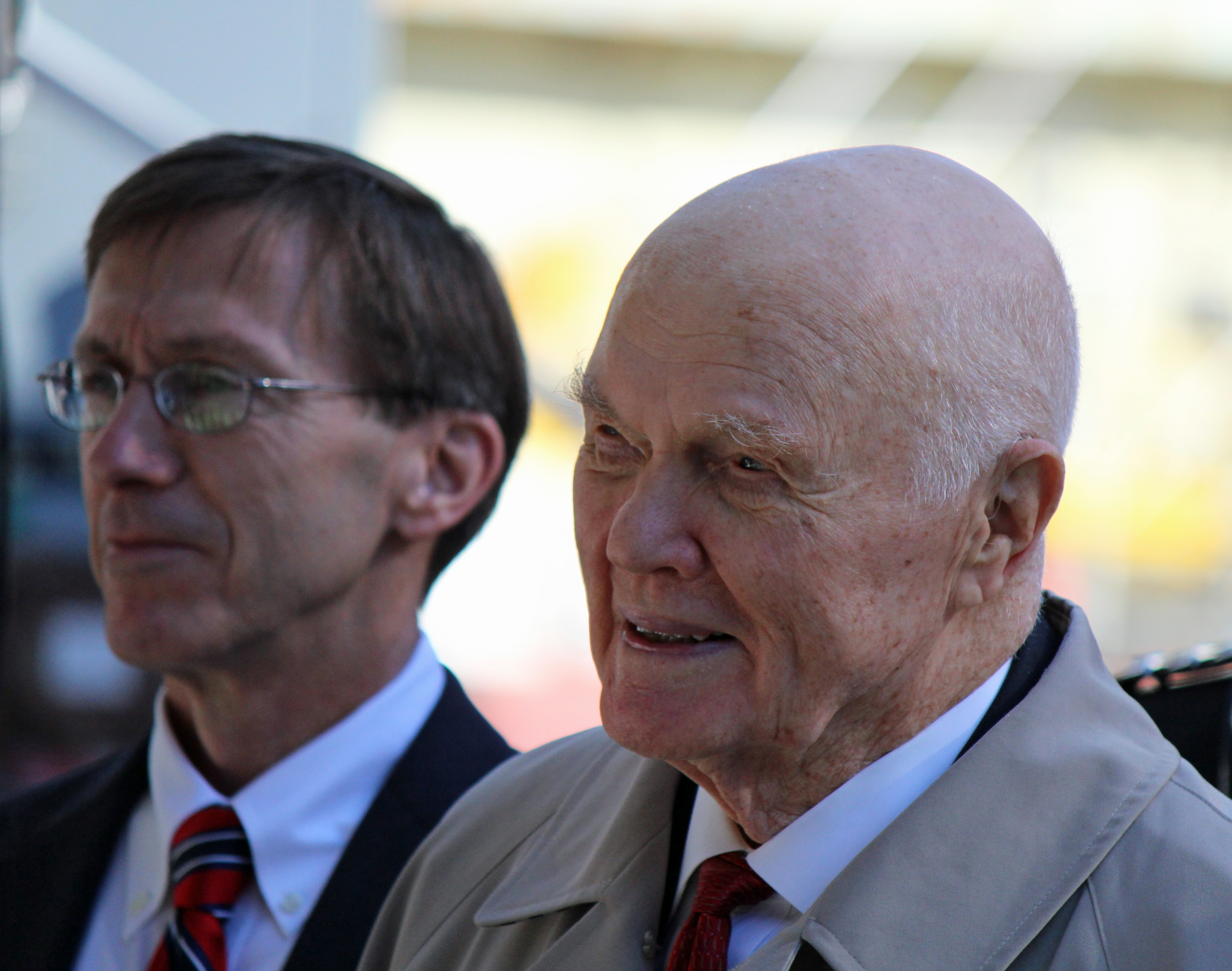
Sean Stackley and John Glenn at the christening ceremony in February 2014

The ship's keel was laid down on 17 April 2012 at the National Steel and Shipbuilding Company (NASSCO) shipyard in San Diego, California. She was christened on 2 February 2014 and was attended by John Glenn and his family. Other Navy and Marine guest speakers that attended the ceremony include Assistant Secretary of the Navy (Research, Development and Acquisitions) Sean Stackley, Chief of Naval Operations Jonathan Greenert, and Lieutenant General John A. Toolan.

John Glenn was delivered in 2014 to the Military Sealift Command's Maritime Prepositioning Force. As an ESD, the ship is under the command of the United States Navy's Military Sealift Command, and thus will not be commissioned into the US Navy (hence her designation prefix, "USNS"). The ship will undergo further construction additions at the Vigor Industrial shipyard in Portland, Oregon.

== Ship re-designation ==
Effective 4 September 2015, U.S. Secretary of the Navy Ray Mabus officially announced the creation of a new ship designation, "E" for expeditionary support. Joint High Speed Vessel (JHSV) will be called Expeditionary Fast Transport, or EPF; the Mobile Landing Platform (MLP) will be called Expeditionary Transfer Dock, or ESD; and the Afloat Forward Staging Base (AFSB) variant of the MLP will be called Expeditionary Mobile Base, or ESB. The new designation was pursuant to a memorandum sent to Secretary Mabus from Chief of Naval Operations Admiral Jonathan Greenert dated 31 August 2015.

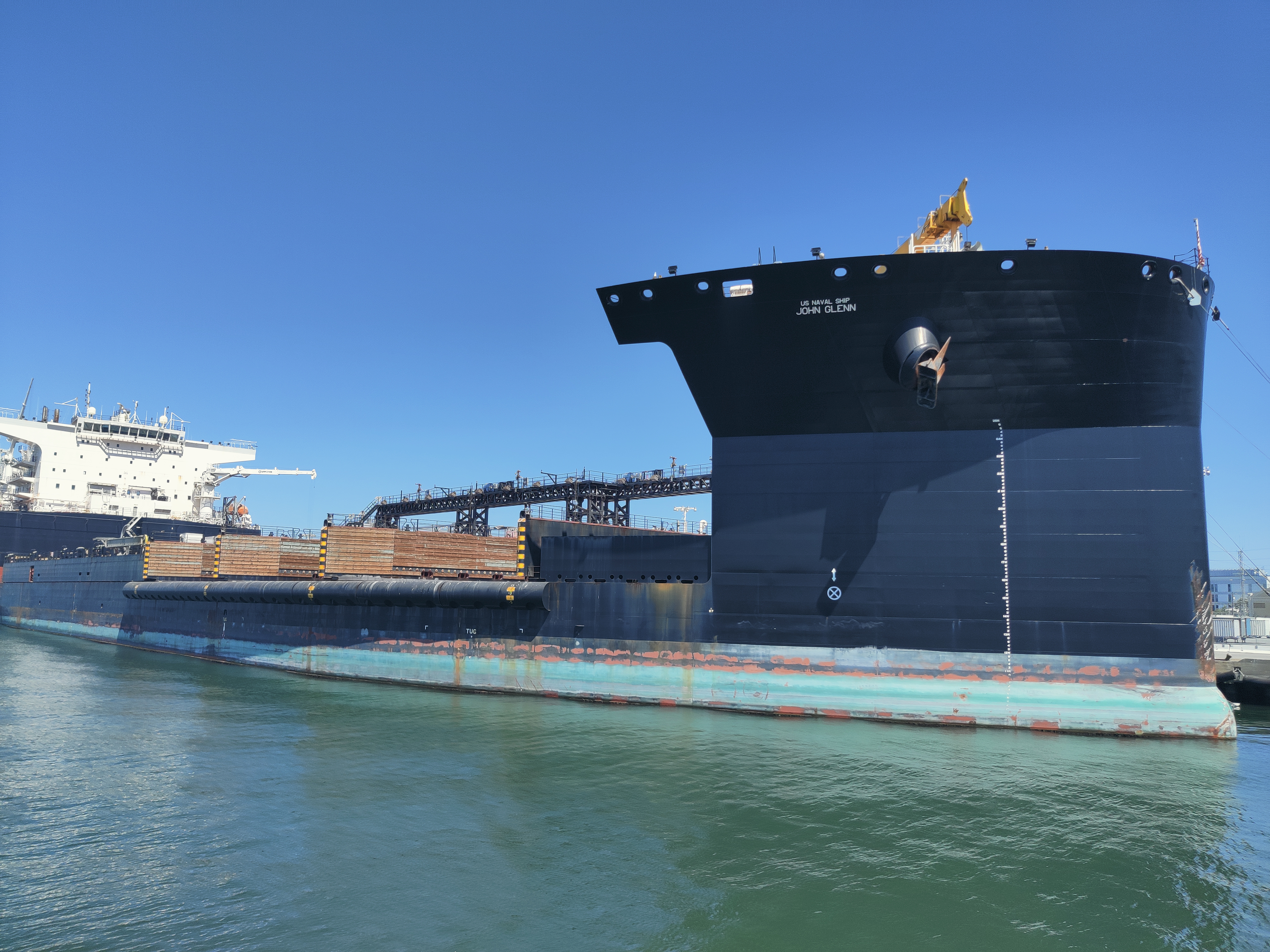
USNS John Glenn in Oakland Seaport, July 2024
