= Glenn High School =

Glenn High School can refer to:

- A number of institutions named John Glenn High School (disambiguation)
- Robert B. Glenn High School
- Glenn High School (Leander, Texas)
