= USS Hershel "Woody" Williams =

US Navy expeditionary mobile base vessel

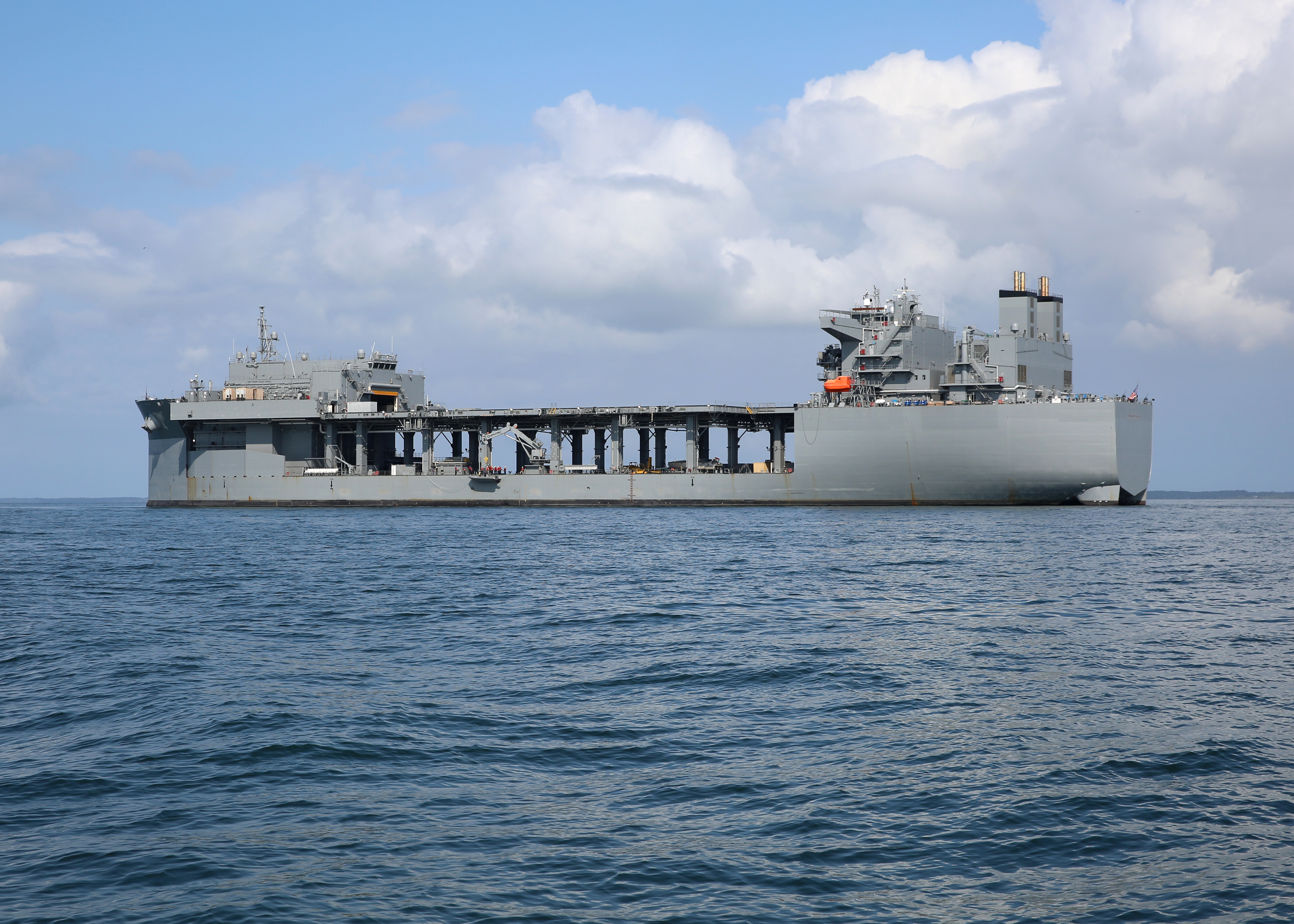
- Then-USNS Hershel "Woody" Williams in September 2019

History

United States
- Namesake: Hershel W. Williams
- Builder: GD/ NASSCO – San Diego, California
- Laid down: 2 August 2016
- Launched: 19 August 2017
- Christened: 21 October 2017
- Acquired: 22 February 2018
- Commissioned: 7 March 2020
- Identification: IMO number: 9804306; MMSI number: 368926087; Callsign: NHWW
- Motto: Peace We Seek, Peace We Keep
- Status: in active service
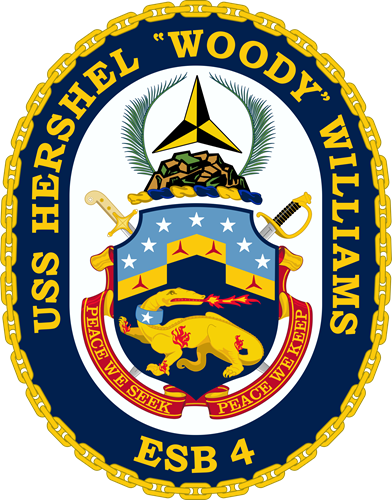
- Badge

General characteristics
- Class & type: Expeditionary Mobile Base
- Length: 784 feet (239 m)
- Complement: 19 officers, 231 enlisted
- Sensors & processing systems: SEA GIRAFFE AMB
- Aircraft carried: MH-53 and MH-60 helicopters

USS Hershel "Woody" Williams (ESB-4) (formerly USNS Hershel "Woody" Williams (T-ESB-4)) is a Lewis B. Puller-class expeditionary mobile base (ESB), currently in service with the United States Navy. The ship is also a sub-variant of the Montford Point-class expeditionary transfer dock (ESD). The ESDs are operated by the Navy's Military Sealift Command with predominantly civilian crews, while the ESBs, owing to the nature of their operations, have been commissioned and commanded directly by the U.S. Navy. The ship was named in honor of Hershel W. "Woody" Williams in an announcement by then-Secretary of the Navy Ray Mabus, on 14 January 2016. Williams was a Marine who was awarded the Medal of Honor in the Battle of Iwo Jima, during World War II.

The $498 million contract for the then-unnamed vessel was awarded to the National Steel and Shipbuilding Company (NASSCO), a division of General Dynamics, in December 2014. Her keel was laid on 2 August 2016, and she was scheduled to be completed in early 2018. The vessel was christened on 21 October 2017, at NASSCO in San Diego. The ship was delivered to Military Sealift Command on 22 February 2018, and placed into service the same day.

Hershel "Woody" Williams will be the first Navy ship other than the Littoral Combat Ship and Oliver Hazard Perry-class frigate to deploy the Northrop Grumman MQ-8 Fire Scout rotary-wing UCAV.

The ship was commissioned by the Navy in Norfolk, Virginia on 7 March 2020. Williams was present for the ship commissioning ceremony.

Since 2020 it is deployed to Souda Bay Naval Base in the Mediterranean Sea.

Hershel "Woody" Williams, while with the U.S. Sixth Fleet, visited Cape Town, South Africa in February 2021, and again in August 2022.

On 28 February 2023, Hershel "Woody" Williams arrived in Mersin, Turkey to deliver relief supplies for those affected by the 2023 Turkey-Syria earthquake.

On 10 May 2024, Hershel "Woody" Williams suffered a "soft" grounding after leaving port in Gabon, Africa.

On 3 June 2024, Hershel "Woody" Williams made its first visit to the port of Malaga to complete a rest call.
