= JGH =

JGH may refer to:

- J. Gordon Holt (1930–2009), American audio engineer and magazine publisher
- Jewish General Hospital, in Montreal, Canada
- Glendalough railway station, in Western Australia
- Jhang railway station, in Pakistan

== See also ==
- JGHS (disambiguation)
