= John Glenn High School =

John Glenn High School can mean:

- Elwood-John H. Glenn High School, Huntington, New York
- John Glenn High School (California), Norwalk, California
- John Glenn High School (New Concord, Ohio)
- John Glenn High School (Bangor Township, Michigan)
- John Glenn High School (Westland, Michigan)
- John Glenn High School (Walkerton, Indiana)

== See also ==
- John Glenn Middle School of International Studies, a middle school in Indio, California
- Glenn High School (disambiguation)
- John Glenn (disambiguation)
