= Alaska-class oil tanker =

Class of VLCC tankers

- M/T Alaskan Navigator transiting the Golden Gate

Class overview
- Builders: National Steel and Shipbuilding Company
- Operators: Alaska Tanker Company
- Preceded by: Sun Shipbuilding & Drydock Co. "Ecology" Class Tankers, San Clemente-class oil tanker
- Completed: 4
- Active: 4

General characteristics
- Type: VLCC tanker
- Tonnage: 193,049 DWT
- Displacement: 231,875 tons, maximum
- Length: 941.6 ft (287.0 m)
- Beam: 164 ft (50 m)
- Draft: 61 ft 11 in (18.87 m)
- Propulsion: Diesel-Electric, 26,820 bhp (20,000 kW) at 85 RPM, twin inboard-turning fixed-pitch four-bladed propellers
- Speed: 15.8 knots (29.3 km/h; 18.2 mph) at 90% MCR, Full Load
- Capacity: 1.3×10^{6} bbl (210,000 m^{3}) at 98%
- Crew: 24

The Alaska-class is a class of VLCC tankers built by National Steel and Shipbuilding Company, San Diego between 2004 and 2006. The tankers are double-hulled as mandated by the Oil Pollution Act of 1990, and replaced the older fleet used by BP in the Alaskan area. They are currently the largest American-flagged ships by cargo capacity and full-load displacement, and the largest Jones Act-compliant ships by any metric.

== Design ==
Per BP's requirement, NASSCO designed and built these ships as "triple-double" redundant. This means two fully independent fire- gas- and water-tight engine rooms, two propulsion motors and propellers, and two rudders - unlike the vast majority of large commercial ships which have one of each. Additionally, the use of diesel-electric propulsion provides a great deal of operational flexibility, albeit at the cost of reduced fuel efficiency at full sea speed versus direct-drive low speed marine diesel engines of similar power.

The main propulsion plant was designed around four MAN 6L 48/60A medium-speed marine diesel engines driving Alstom T&D alternators producing 6.6 kV, 6,300 kW (8,442 hp) at 514 RPM, two per engine room, using ultra-low-sulfur diesel to minimize particulate pollution. Depending on schedule and other requirements, the ships can run on as few as one generator or as many as all four, but generally operate on two or three to maximize efficiency and allow for engine maintenance and repair while underway.

The propellers are directly driven by Alstom M3HXD 330 6.6 kV electric motors, each outputting up to 10 MW_{m} at 85 RPM. These motors in turn consist of two linked "half-drives" each fed by its own synchroconverter. In the event of a half-drive failure, the other paired half-drive can continue propelling the ship at reduced RPM and torque output. In port, power from one half-drive per motor is diverted to run the electrically-driven cargo pumps.

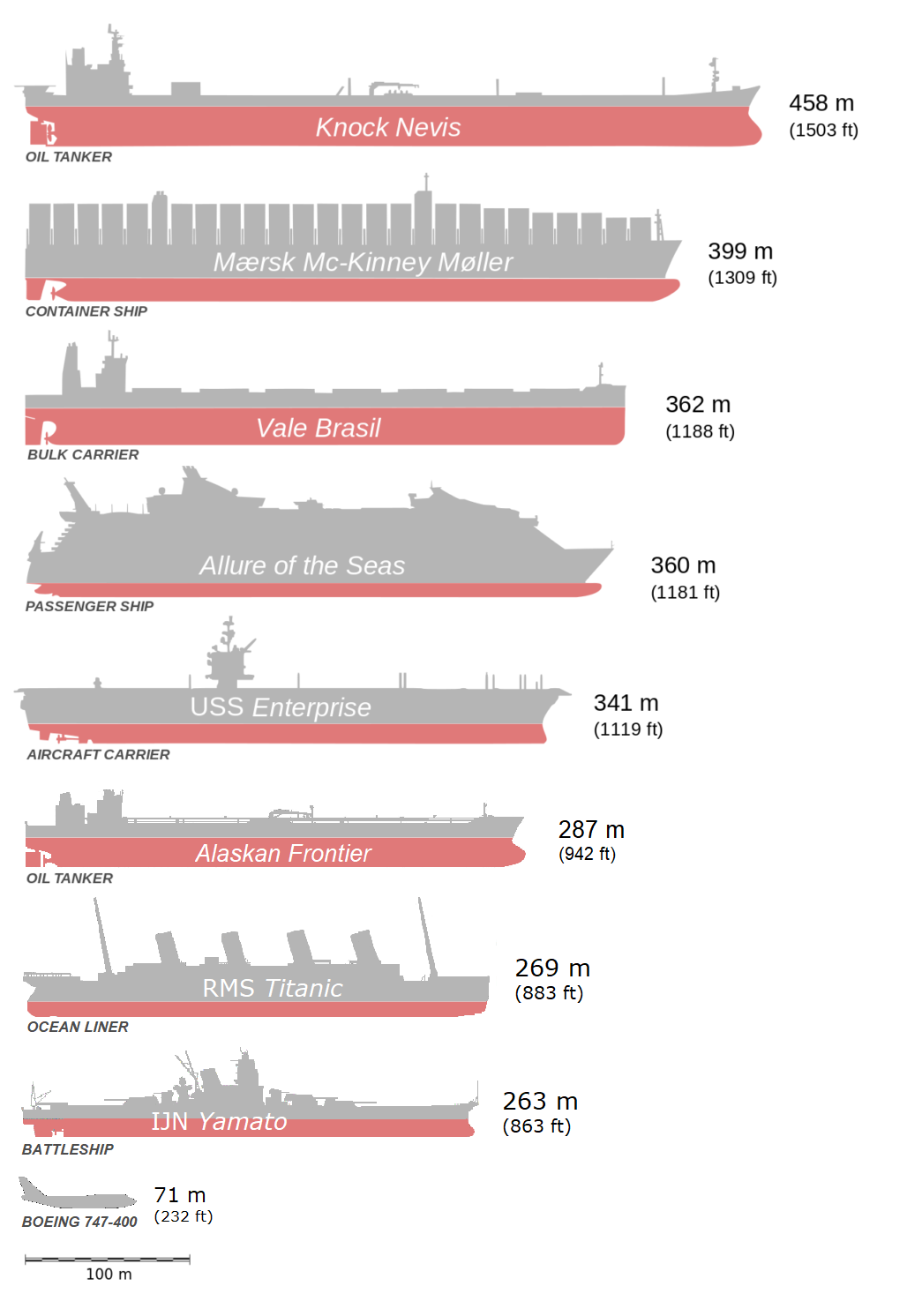
Size Comparison Against Other Noteworthy Ships

While these design choices increased construction and operating costs relative to traditional large tanker designs, they were considered prudent precautions in the wake of multiple high-profile oil tanker casualties, particularly of the Exxon Valdez which was a contemporary of the ships the Alaska class replaced. NASSCO had relevant experience designing and constructing diesel-electric ships, having recently built the Orca class trailerships for TOTE Maritime.

Stern view of the M/T Alaskan Navigator in drydock, showing the unusual twin propellers and twin rudders.

In addition to the mechanical redundancy built into the design, the Alaska class has numerous design features to improve environmental stewardship and reduce the chances of oil spills. These include running the cargo pipelines through the cargo tanks themselves to contain any possible leakage, the inclusion of two "deck drain tanks" each capable of catching up to 42,000 gallons of oil or oily water from the deck, seawater-lubricated propeller shaft seals to avoid the potential for lube oil leaks into the environment, and a system for transferring engine waste oil into the slop tanks for recycling by the refineries. The "forepeak" space between the bow and collision bulkhead (traditionally used as a water ballast tank) is an unused void, and only aft of the collision bulkhead are the forward ballast tanks which provide a second layer of protection to the cargo tanks in the event of grounding or collision.

The concept of "Cold Ironing" in oil tankers was pioneered by the M/T Alaskan Frontier and M/T Alaskan Navigator at Long Beach, CA Pier T-121 in 2009, proving a new way to reduce local air pollution from ship operations. This involves using a quick-connect electricity delivery system from the dock, supplying power for the ship's cargo pumps and base electrical loads from municipal power plants instead of the ship's own diesel generators.

Additionally, the vessels were each retrofitted between 2009 and 2010 with a Caterpillar 3512C V12 "Harbor Diesel" generator which uses less fuel and produces fewer emissions when the ship is idle in port or at anchor.

Between June 2024 and August 2026, all four ships had their engines upgraded to Everllence 6L 51/60s, which produce the same power output in the same form factor but with improved fuel and lubricant consumptions and the potential for future dual fuel use.

== Operations ==
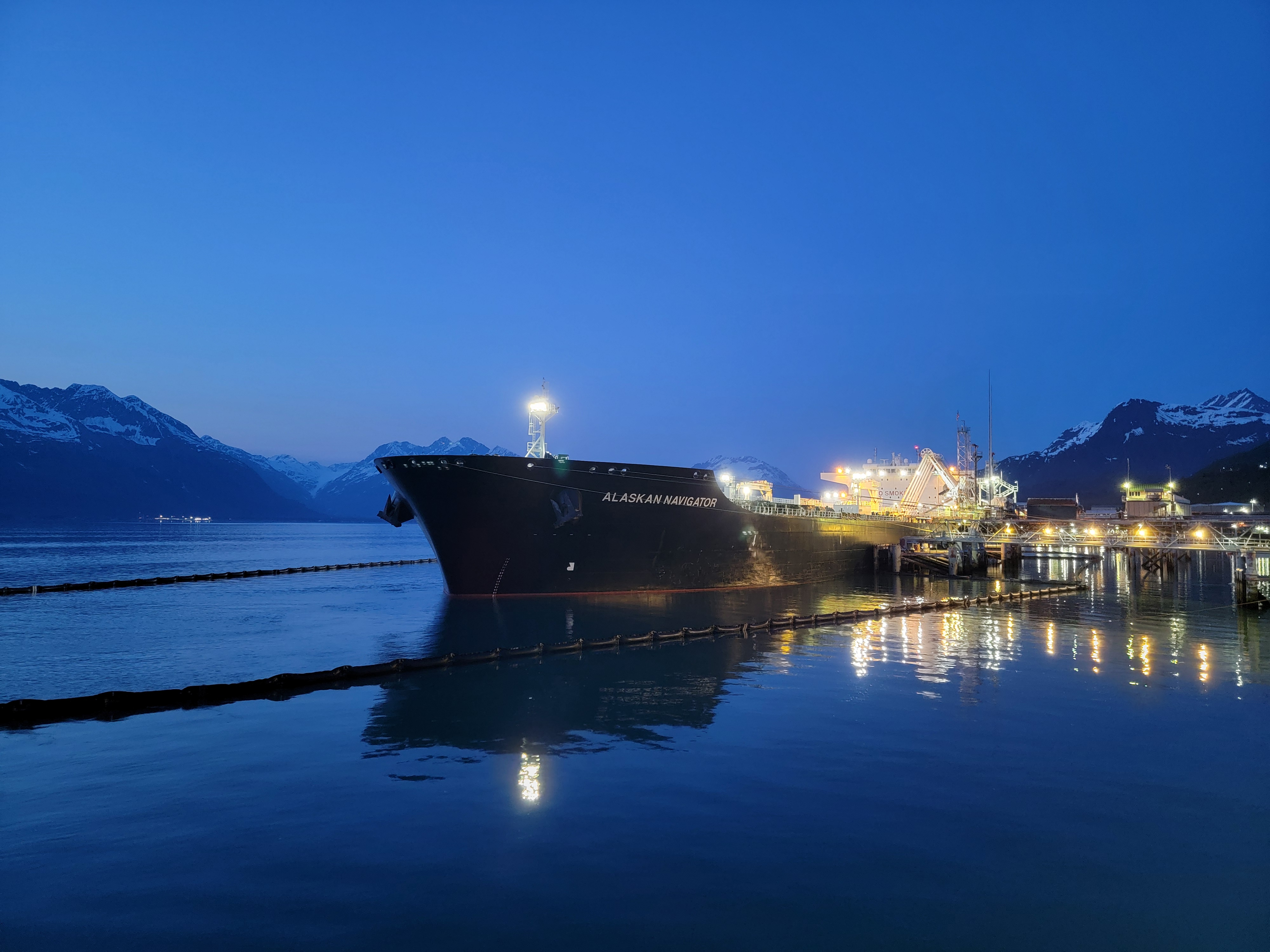
M/T Alaskan Navigator fully laden alongside the Valdez Marine Terminal.

The Alaska class ships were built for the "TAPS Trade," serving as the second part of the Trans-Alaska Pipeline System, loading North Slope crude oil from the pipeline's terminus at the Valdez Marine Terminal for delivery to refineries on the US West Coast.

The Alaska Tanker Company operates these ships with a strong emphasis on environmental protection, and is a voluntary participant in the Washington State "ECOPRO" or Exceptional Compliance program for taking measures significantly beyond legal requirement to protect against oil spills and operational pollution.

In 2018, amid declining output from the Alaska North Slope oil fields, the M/T Alaskan Frontier was placed in cold layup in Labuan, Malaysia.

After BP withdrew from Alaska, the BP-operated Alaska Tanker Company including the ships were sold to the Overseas Shipholding Group, with the sale completed in March 2020.

In 2024, the M/T Alaskan Frontier was returned to service after a five-month overhaul and modernization.

As of 2026, all four ships are in active service.

== Ships in class ==
Four ships were completed between 2004 and 2006, in order: Motor Tanker (M/T) Alaskan Frontier, Alaskan Explorer, Alaskan Navigator, and Alaskan Legend.

== Derivatives ==
Due to the inherent survivability given by the multiple redundancies, and the maturity of the ship design, the Alaska class was the basis of the Montford Point and Lewis B. Puller classes of Mobile Landing Platforms for the US Navy.

== Images ==
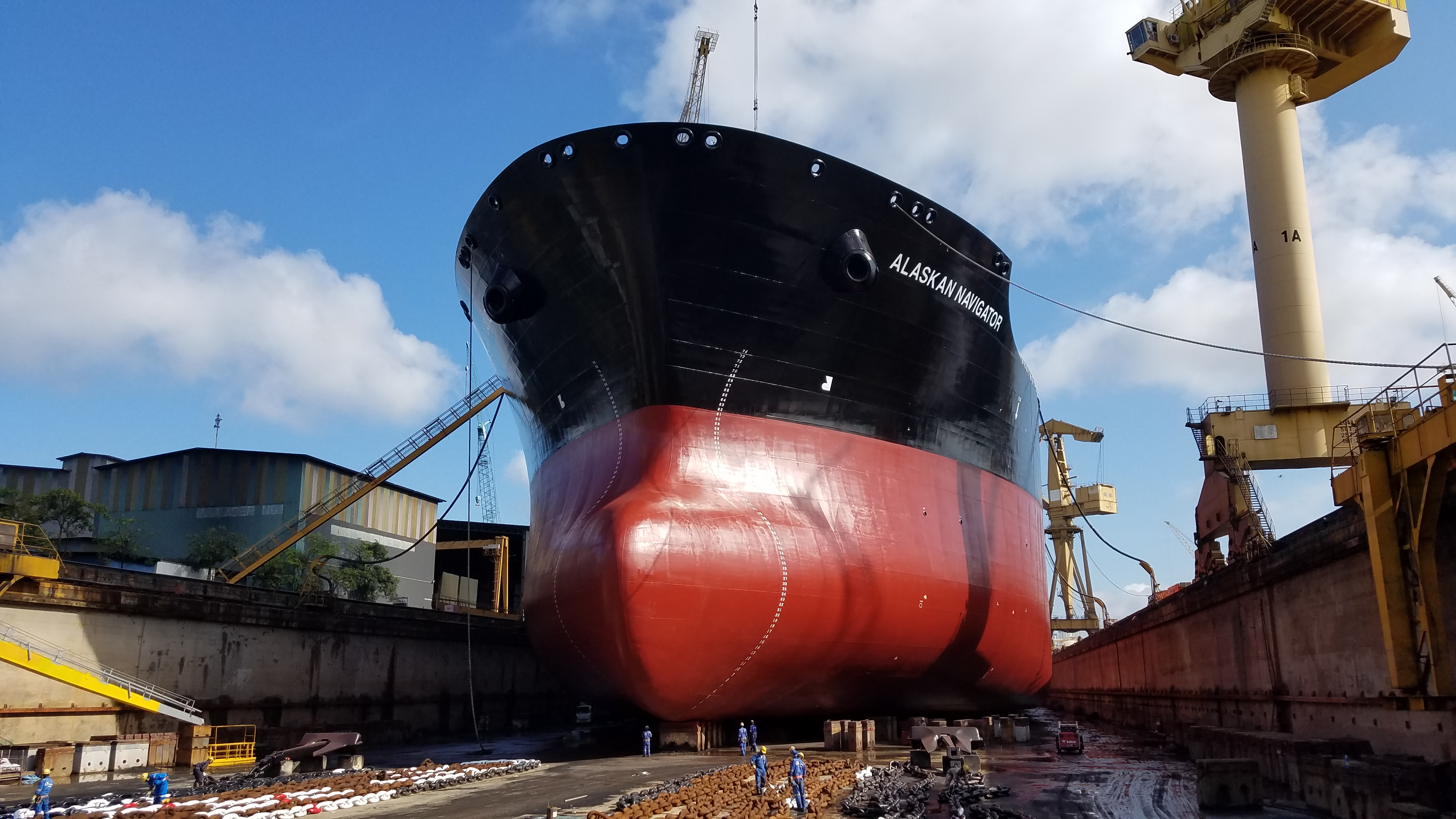
Bow of the M/T Alaskan Navigator in drydock for routine overhaul.

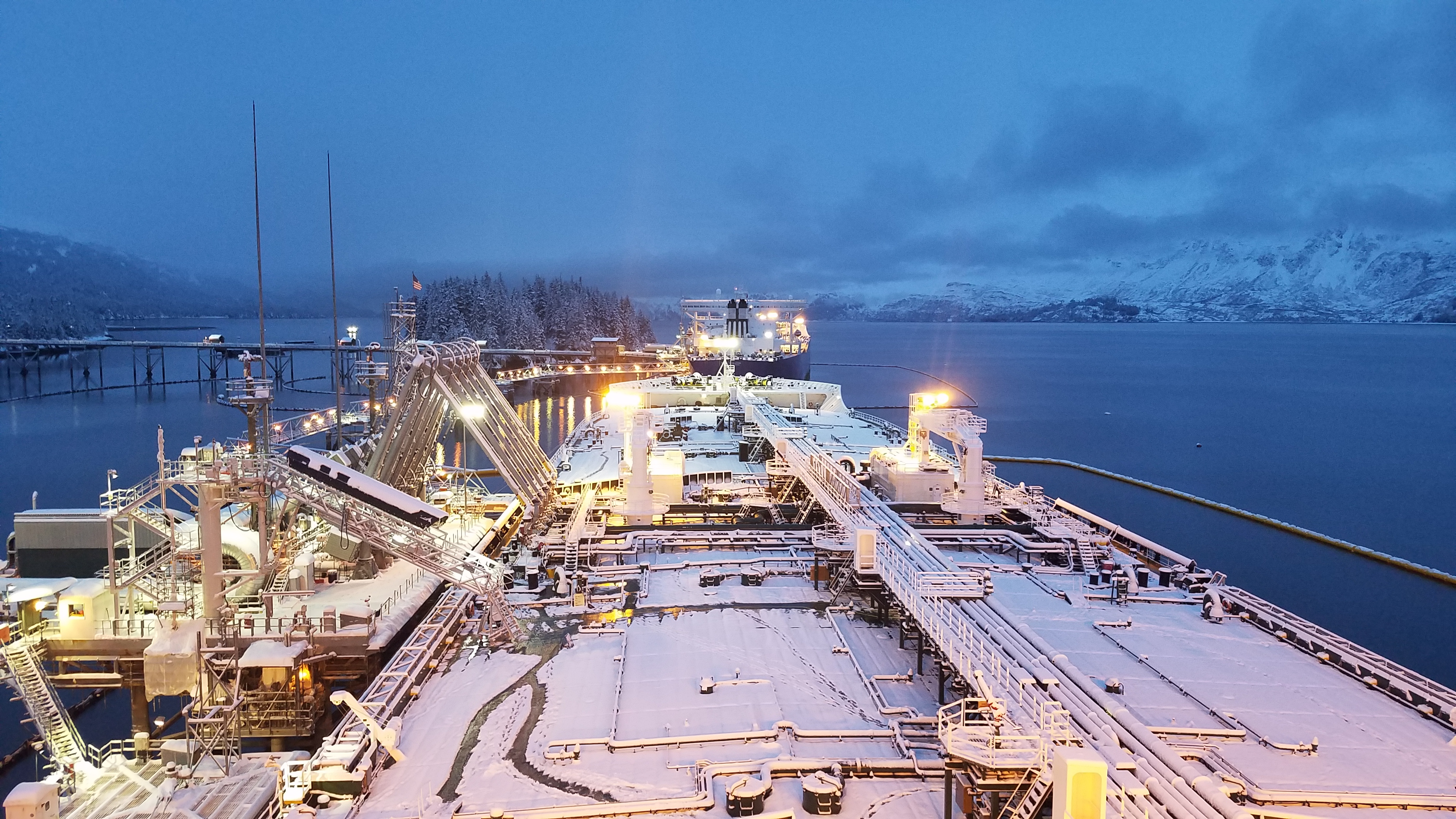
An Alaska-Class tanker seen loading at the Valdez Marine Terminal Berth 4 in winter. A Millennium-class tanker loads at Berth 5 ahead.

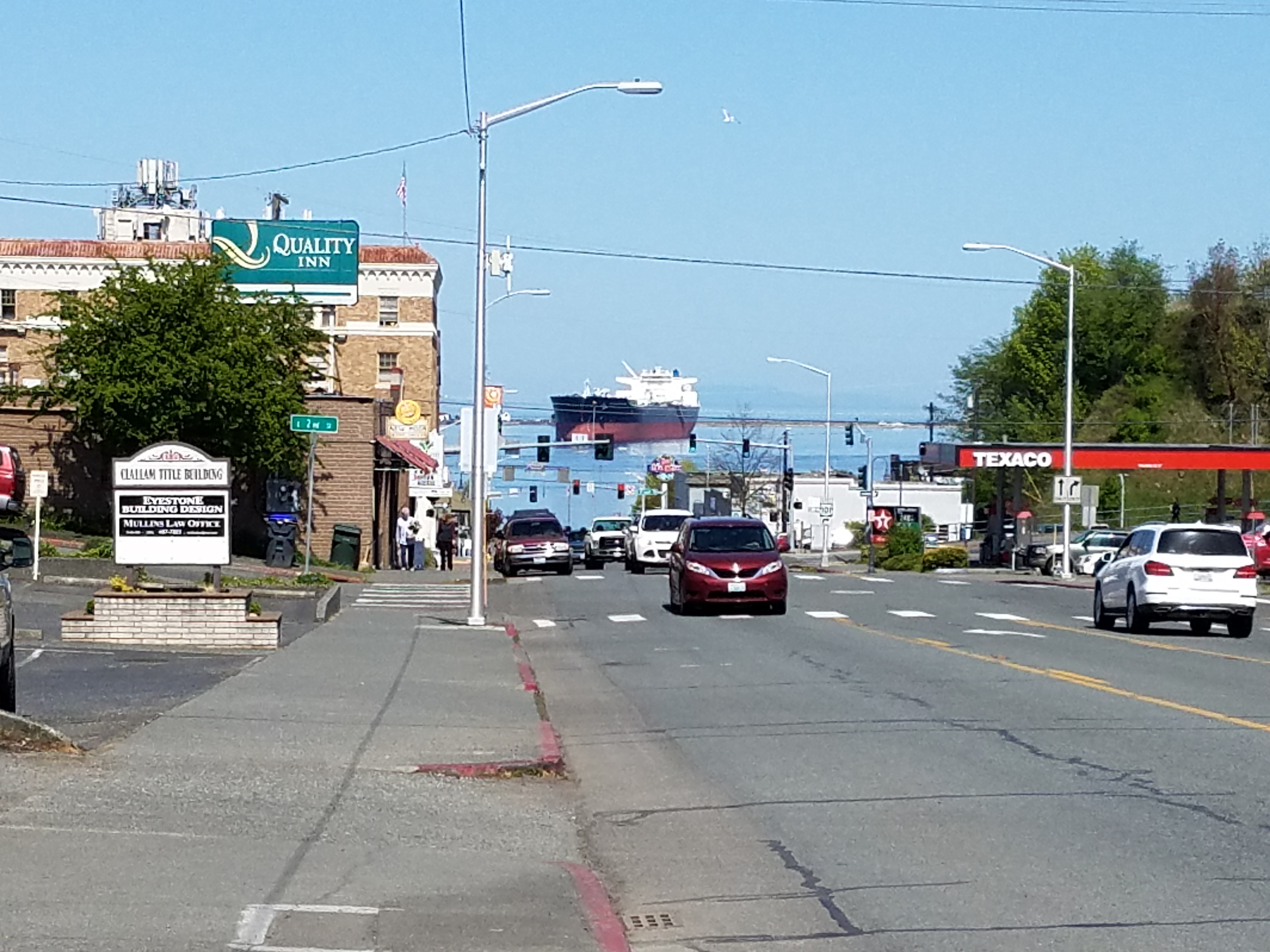
M/T Alaskan Explorer seen at anchor from downtown Port Angeles, Washington.

M/T Alaskan Navigator at anchor in Long Beach, CA Inner Anchorage B

M/T Alaskan Explorer as seen from the M/T Alaskan Navigator at the Alyeska Valdez Marine Terminal in the summer

M/T Alaskan Navigator passing beneath the Golden Gate Bridge inbound for San Francisco Bay

M/T Alaskan Frontier in the Columbia River

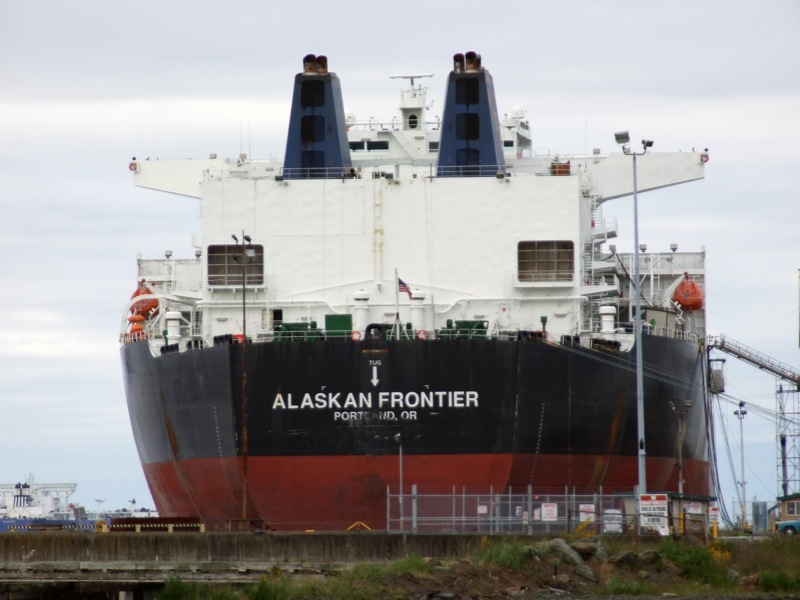
Stern view of the M/T Alaskan Frontier

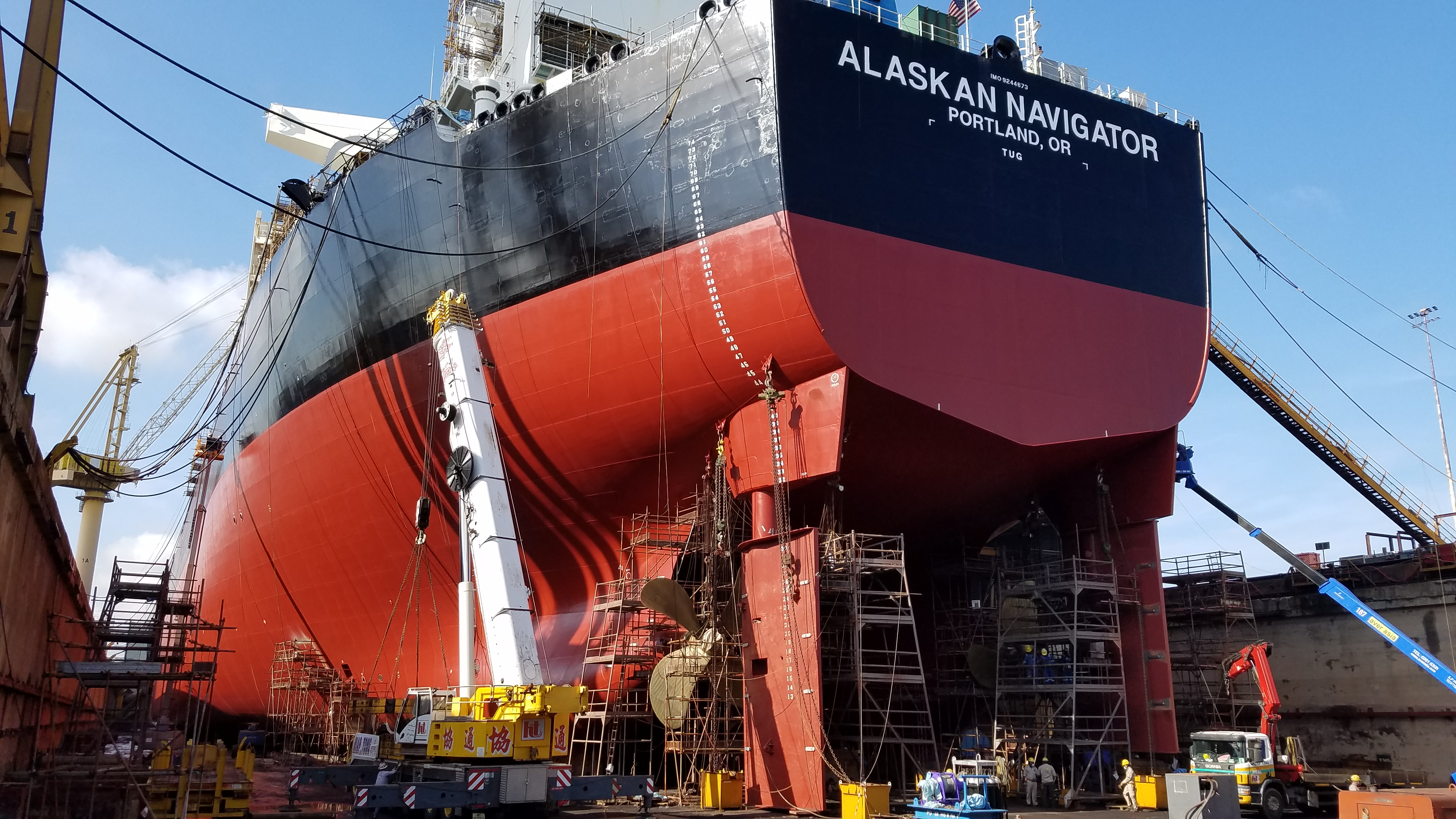
M/T Alaskan Navigator in drydock for routine overhaul
