= Expeditionary Transfer Dock =

Class of cargo ship

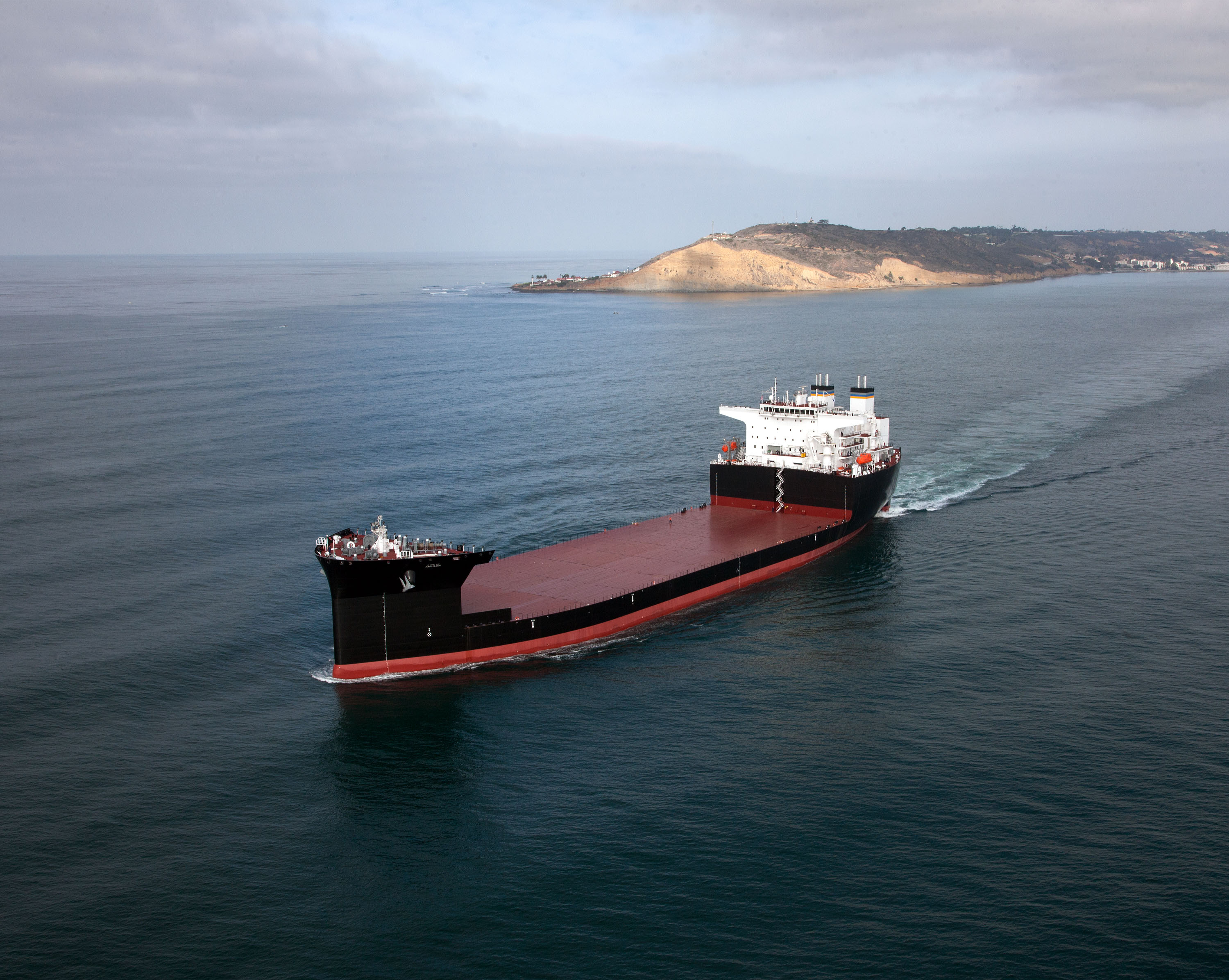
- USNS John Glenn (T-ESD-2) sea trials in 2014

Class overview
- Builders: General Dynamics National Steel and Shipbuilding Company (NASSCO)
- Operators: United States Navy
- Built: 2012-present
- In commission: 2013-present
- Planned: 8
- Completed: 8
- Active: 6

General characteristics
- Tonnage: >60,000 metric dwt
- Length: 785 ft (239 m)
- Beam: 164 ft (50 m)
- Draft: 39.37 ft (12.00 m)
- Propulsion: 4 × MAN/B&W medium speed diesels; 24 MW diesel electric plant, twin screw propellers; 2 MW azimuth bow thruster
- Speed: >15 knots (28 km/h; 17 mph)
- Range: 9,500 nautical miles (17,600 km; 10,900 mi) at 15 knots
- Boats & landing craft carried: 3 LCAC
- Aviation facilities: ESB variant: Hangar for 2 × CH-53 and large flight deck

An Expeditionary Transfer Dock (ESD), formerly the Mobile Landing Platform (MLP), is designed to be a semi-submersible, flexible, modular platform providing the US Navy with the capability to perform large-scale logistics movements such as the transfer of vehicles and equipment from sea to shore. These ships significantly reduce the dependency on foreign ports and provide support in the absence of port availability. The class also houses a sub-class variant called the Expeditionary Mobile Base (ESB), formerly the Afloat Forward Staging Base (AFSB).

The ESD and ESB are part of a new ship class added in 2015 with an E as a new designator, similar to the L-class amphibious ships, S-class submarines, A-class auxiliaries and more. These three E-class ships were previously listed as seabasing ships in the Naval Vessel Register. In May 2011, General Dynamics NASSCO received a $744 million contract modification to fully fund the construction of the first two ships of the class, USNS Montford Point (ESD-1) and USNS John Glenn (ESD-2). Additional funding of $115 million for long lead time material and advanced design was awarded in August 2011.

The first ship of the ESD program, USNS Montford Point (ESD-1) was delivered in May 2013, and the second ship, USNS John Glenn (ESD-2), was delivered March 12, 2014. In 2012, a third MLP, USS Lewis B. Puller (ESB-3), was added to the contract and reconfigured as an Expeditionary Mobile Base (ESB), or formerly known as an MLP Afloat Forward Staging Base (AFSB). All three ships have been delivered to the U.S. Navy.

In September 2015, the Navy decided to redesignate the MLP as the Expeditionary Transfer Dock (ESD) and the AFSB as the Expeditionary Mobile Base (ESB). The Navy plans to procure six Expeditionary Mobile Bases (ESBs) in total, with a fourth (ESB-6) ordered in FY2018, a fifth (ESB-7) ordered in FY2019, and the sixth and final ship (ESB-8) with an order date yet to be determined.

In mid-2022, the Marine Corps announced its intention to retire both ESD ships after less than a decade of active service, but this was rejected by Congress in December 2022. The ships were subsequently placed in reduced operating status.

== Design ==
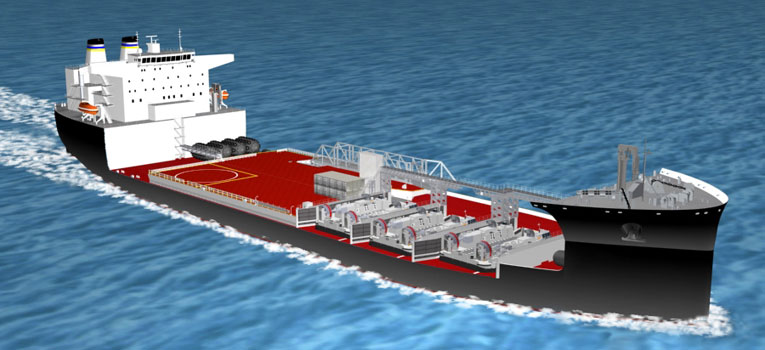
A computer-generated image depicting the Expeditionary Transfer Dock design

The Expeditionary Transfer Dock concept is a large auxiliary support ship to facilitate the 'seabasing' of an amphibious landing force by acting as a floating base or transfer station that can be prepositioned off the target area. Troops, equipment, and cargo would be transferred to the ESD by large-draft ships, from where they can be moved ashore by shallower-draft vessels, landing craft like the Landing Craft Air Cushion (LCAC), or helicopters. For transferring vehicles from the larger ships to the ESD, the vessels were originally to be fitted with a Vehicle Transfer System: a ramp connecting the two ships alongside and able to compensate for the movements of both vessels while underway.

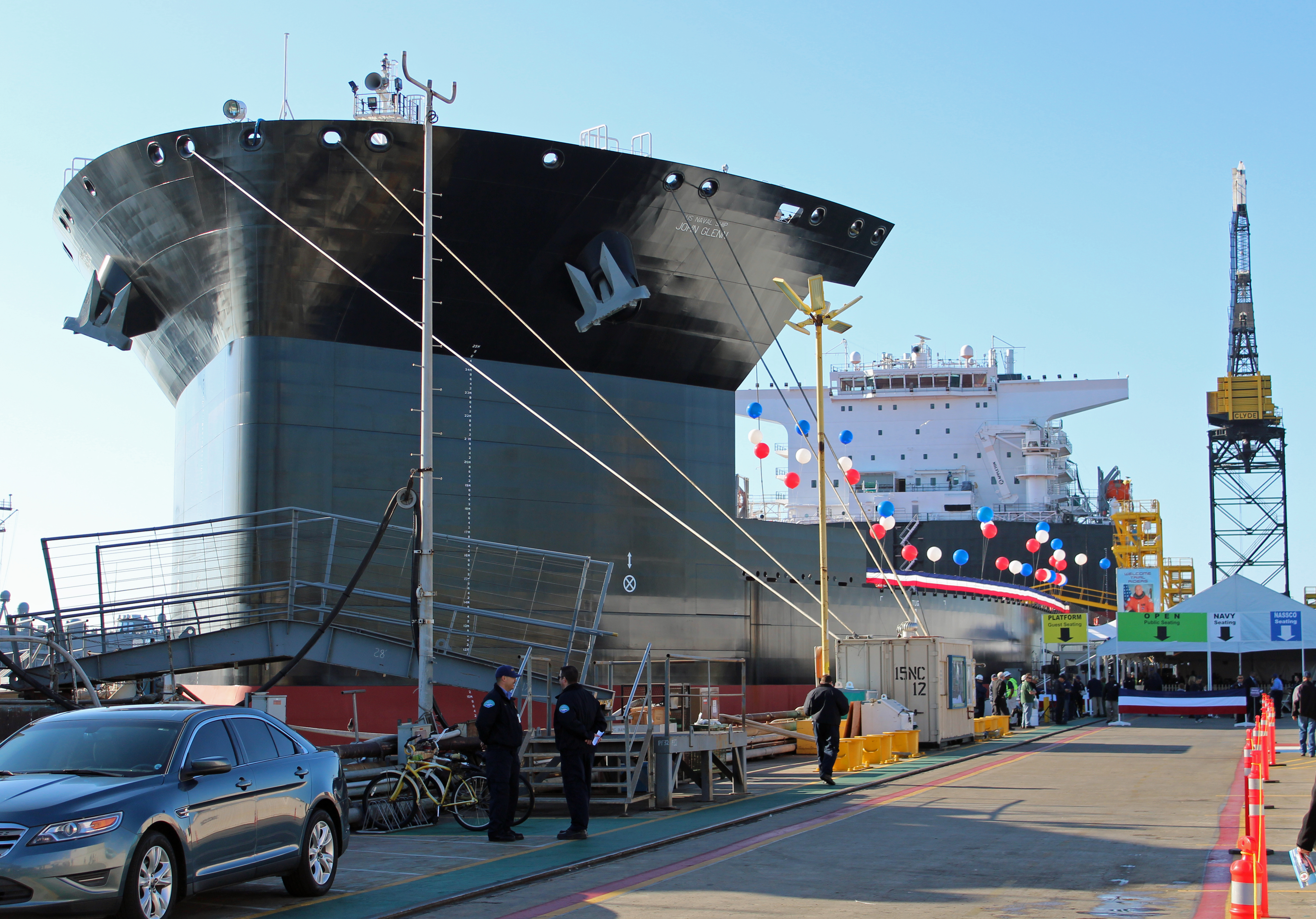
USNS John Glenn naming, February 2014

A preliminary design by General Dynamics envisioned a ship that carried six LCACs, with the ability to turn around (dock, unload or load, then launch) two landing craft simultaneously from the stern. The ESDs were to host a brigade-size force, sail at 20 knots (37 km/h; 23 mph), and have a maximum range of 9,000 nautical miles (17,000 km; 10,000 mi). Each ship was to cost US$1.5 billion to build, but cutbacks to defense spending planned for the fiscal year 2011 budget forced the downscaling of the design in mid-2009.

General Dynamics identified the civilian Alaska-class oil tanker (built by the subsidiary National Steel and Shipbuilding Company) as a suitable basis for an "ESD 'Lite'", with the design modified into a float-on/float-off vessel that could be built for US$500 million per ship. As part of the cost trade-off, the Vehicle Transfer System was scrapped in favor of skin-to-skin mooring of a host ship alongside the ESD, and the LCAC complement was reduced to three. The new design is 785 feet (239 m) long, with a beam of 164 feet (50 m), a top speed of over 15 knots (28 km/h; 17 mph), and a maximum range of 9,500 nautical miles (17,600 km; 10,900 mi). Converteam supplies an integrated power system and vessel automation system for the ESD.

=== USS Ponce ===
In March 2013 Chief of Naval Operations Jonathan Greenert showed PowerPoint of the ESD-Expeditionary Mobile Base (ESD-ESB), a proposed variant of the ESD with increased accommodation, a hangar and large flight deck on piers above the semi-submersible deck, This was first proposed in January 2012, around the time of the sudden announcement that USS Ponce would be converted as an interim AFSB(I) (ESB). The ESD-ESB could be used to support special forces and intelligence gathering as a base for helicopters, MV-22 Osprey tiltrotors and even the F-35B stealth fighter, but the main role of the Ponce will be operating minesweeping MH-53E Sea Dragon helicopters. As of March 2013 "a number of variations" of the ESD were being considered; the ESB can fulfill many of the roles of a $2.5 billion "big deck" amphibious ship at a quarter of the price.

=== Expeditionary Mobile Base (ESB) variants ===
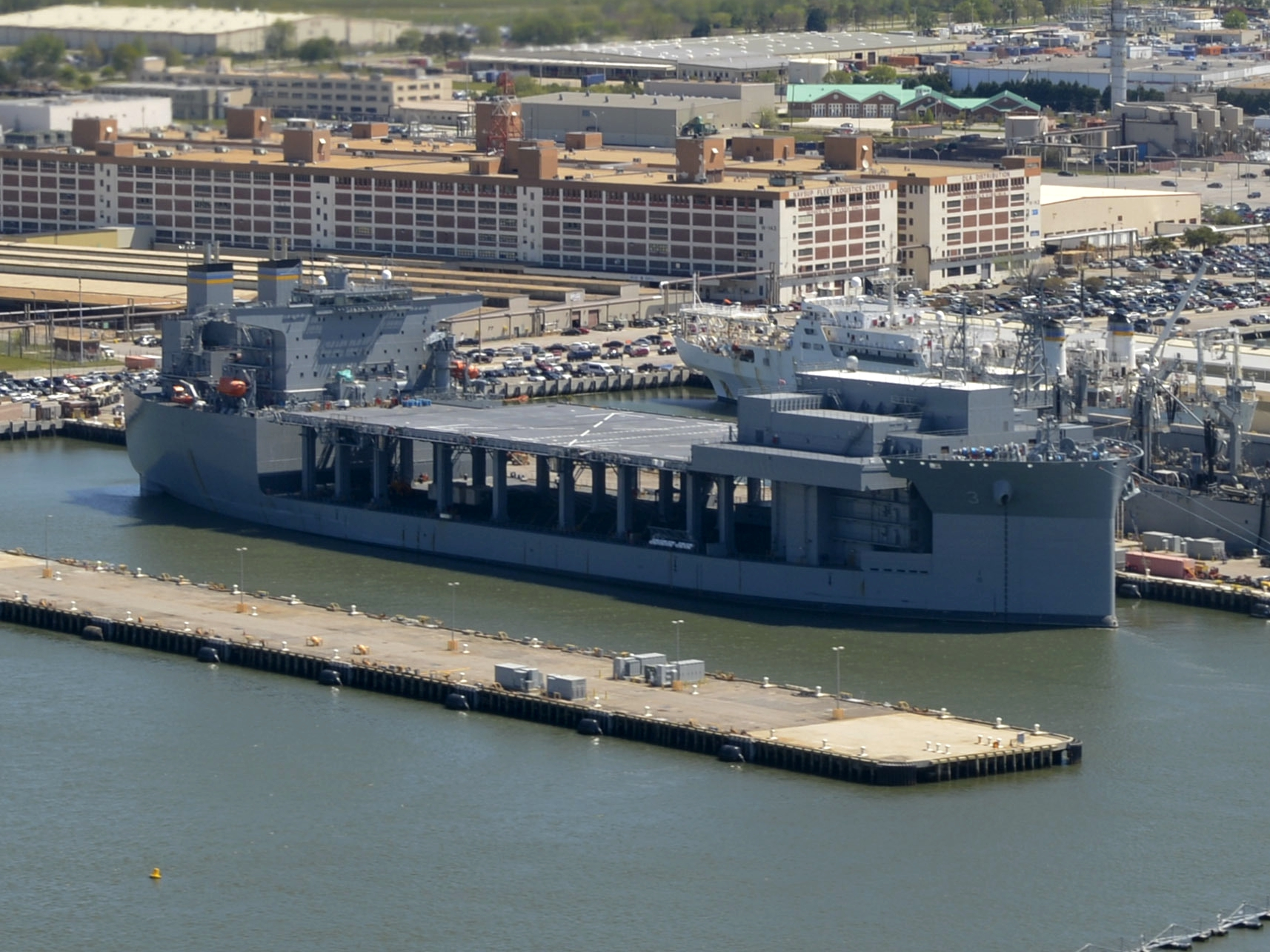
ESB variant USS Lewis B. Puller

Unlike the first two Expeditionary Transfer Dock (ESD), the Lewis B. Puller class, or sub-variant, of Expeditionary Mobile Base (ESB) vessels serve to support special forces missions, counter-piracy/smuggling operations, maritime security operations, and mine clearance, as well as humanitarian aid and disaster relief missions. In order to support these extended roles, the ESBs will have military detachments in addition to the civil service mariners.

ESB vessels are designed to support low-intensity missions, allowing more expensive, high-value amphibious warfare ships and surface combatant warships to be re-tasked for more demanding operational missions for the U.S. Navy. These ESB variants are slated to operate in the Middle East and the Pacific Ocean.

Like the first two Expeditionary Transfer Dock, the overall design of the T-ESB-3 and T-ESB-4 is based on the hull of the civilian Alaska-class oil tanker. Both ESB variants will be outfitted with support facilities for its minesweeping, special operations, and other expeditionary missions. An accommodation barge will also be carried to support up to 298 additional mission-related personnel. Their aviation facilities include a 52,000 ft^{2} (4,800 m^{2}) flight deck with landing spots for two heavy-lift transport CH-53 helicopters, as well as additional deck space for two more CH-53s. Lewis B. Puller will also have a helicopter hangar, an ordnance storage magazine, underway replenishment facilities, and deck space for mission-related equipment storage. The addition of a flight deck makes the ship more top-heavy, and so less stable in heavy seas. The deck is made with two operating spots and two parking spots, plus room to store two in the hangar. The mission deck's ability to submerge to launch landing craft was disabled and instead a crane, capable of carrying 11 metric tons (12 short tons) and moving a 41 ft (12 m) boat in up to sea state 3, carries watercraft, towed arrays, and unmanned vehicles into the water.

The United States Navy ordered T-ESB-3 in February 2012 as part of the Fiscal Year 2013 appropriation for the U.S. Department of Defense via the National Defense Sealift Fund (NDSF). The keel-laying ceremony for MKP-3 took place at the General Dynamics NASSCO shipyard in San Diego, California, on 5 November 2013.

On 16 January 2014, at the Surface Naval Association's national symposium, the head of NAVSEA's Strategic and Theater Sealift program, Captain Henry Stevens, announced that the MV-22 Osprey tilt-rotor aircraft would be evaluated for potential operations on board the Expeditionary Mobile Base ESD variant. The testing and certification of MH-53E helicopters for minesweeping operations from ESB support ships was slated to begin during fiscal year 2016. Additionally, Captain Stevens noted that the F-35B STOVL strike fighter was not then being considered for ESB operations because of exhaust heat from F-35B damaging the flight decks of U.S. Navy amphibious assault ships. Some outfitting and specialized equipment specific to the V-22 was needed to support it, but little engineering work or modifications to the ship needed to be done; upon Lewis B. Puller's deployment, it had been upgraded to support V-22 operations by Special Operations Forces.

On 19 December 2014, U.S. Navy's Naval Sea Systems Command awarded a US$498M contract to General Dynamics NASSCO for the construction of second ESB variant, the as-yet unnamed T-ESB-4. This vessel will be built at the NASSCO shipyard in San Diego, California, with a scheduled completion date of 2018.

On 15 January 2021, Secretary of the Navy Kenneth J. Braithwaite announced that ESB-7 will be named USS Robert Simanek in honor of PFC Simanek, a Marine who was awarded the Medal of Honor during the Korean War.

== Concept testing ==
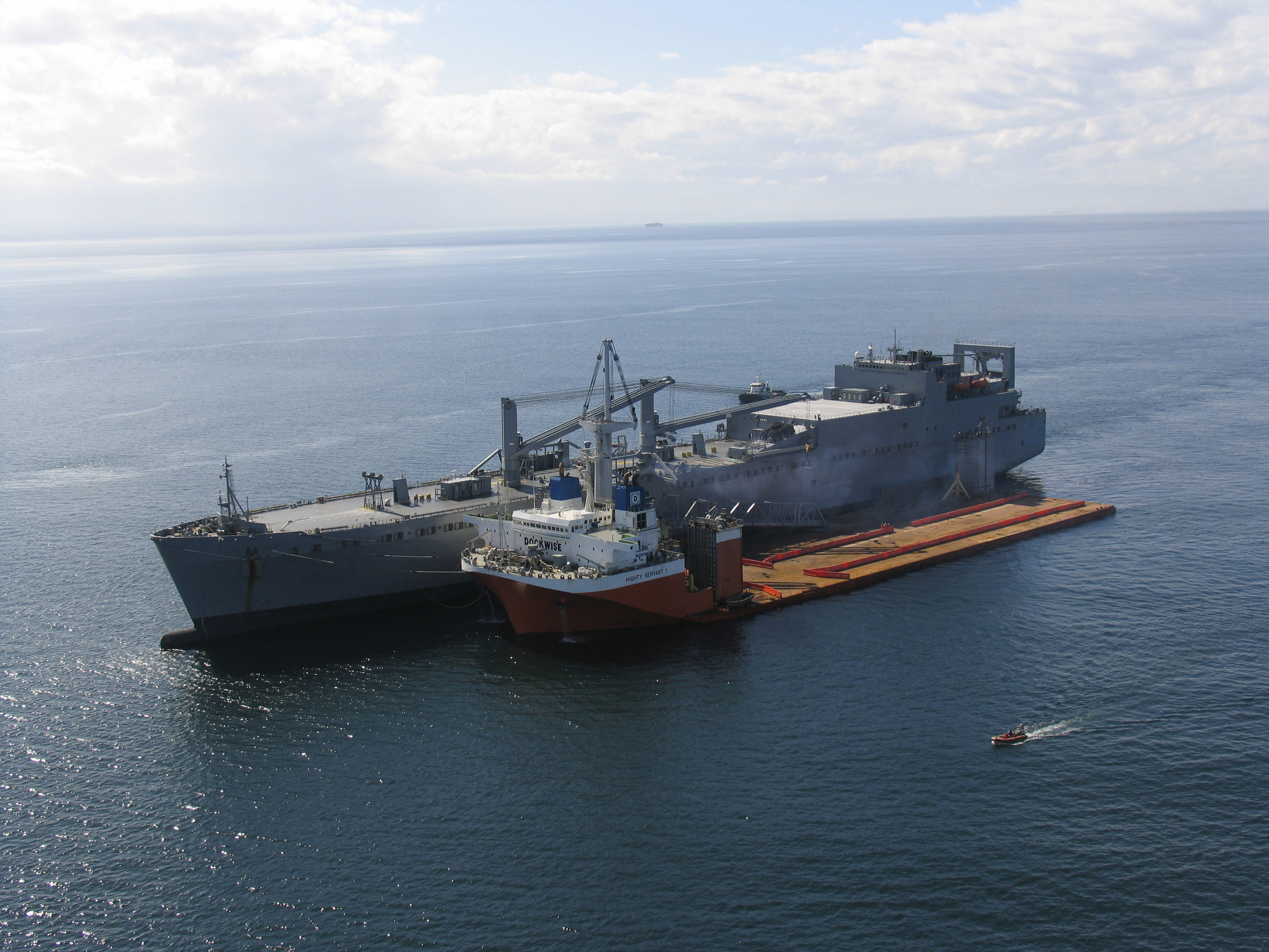
USNS Watkins (back) and heavy lift ship MV Mighty Servant 1 moored side-by-side off San Diego during a demonstration of the Expeditionary Transfer Dock concept in 2005.

In September 2005, the United States Navy approved trials of the ESD concept, to test the feasibility of seabasing for an amphibious operation. The heavy lift ship MV Mighty Servant 1 served as the substitute for the ESD, while the roll-on/roll-off vessel USNS Watkins played the role of a planned type of transport ship for the United States Maritime Prepositioning Force. The first part of the trial consisted of the two ships transferring cargo between themselves while anchored in Puget Sound. After successfully completing this, the vessels sailed to San Diego, where cargo was transferred from Watkins to Mighty Servant 1, then taken ashore by LCACs; slightly submerging the deck of the heavy lift ship allowed the hovercraft to "'fly' aboard".

A second series of tests was conducted off Norfolk, Virginia in September and October 2006, with USNS Red Cloud and MV Mighty Servant 3. This time, the ships were moored together while underway, during which vehicles drove from Red Cloud onto Mighty Servant 3, then embarked aboard LCACs. In February 2010, Mighty Servant 3 joined USNS Soderman for further trials in the Gulf of Mexico. During these, personnel and a wide range of vehicles, from Humvees to M1 Abrams tanks, were transferred to, then launched from Mighty Servant 3, in conditions up to Sea State 4. The transferring cargo was later reduced to Sea State 3 conditions, after some design changes.

== Construction ==
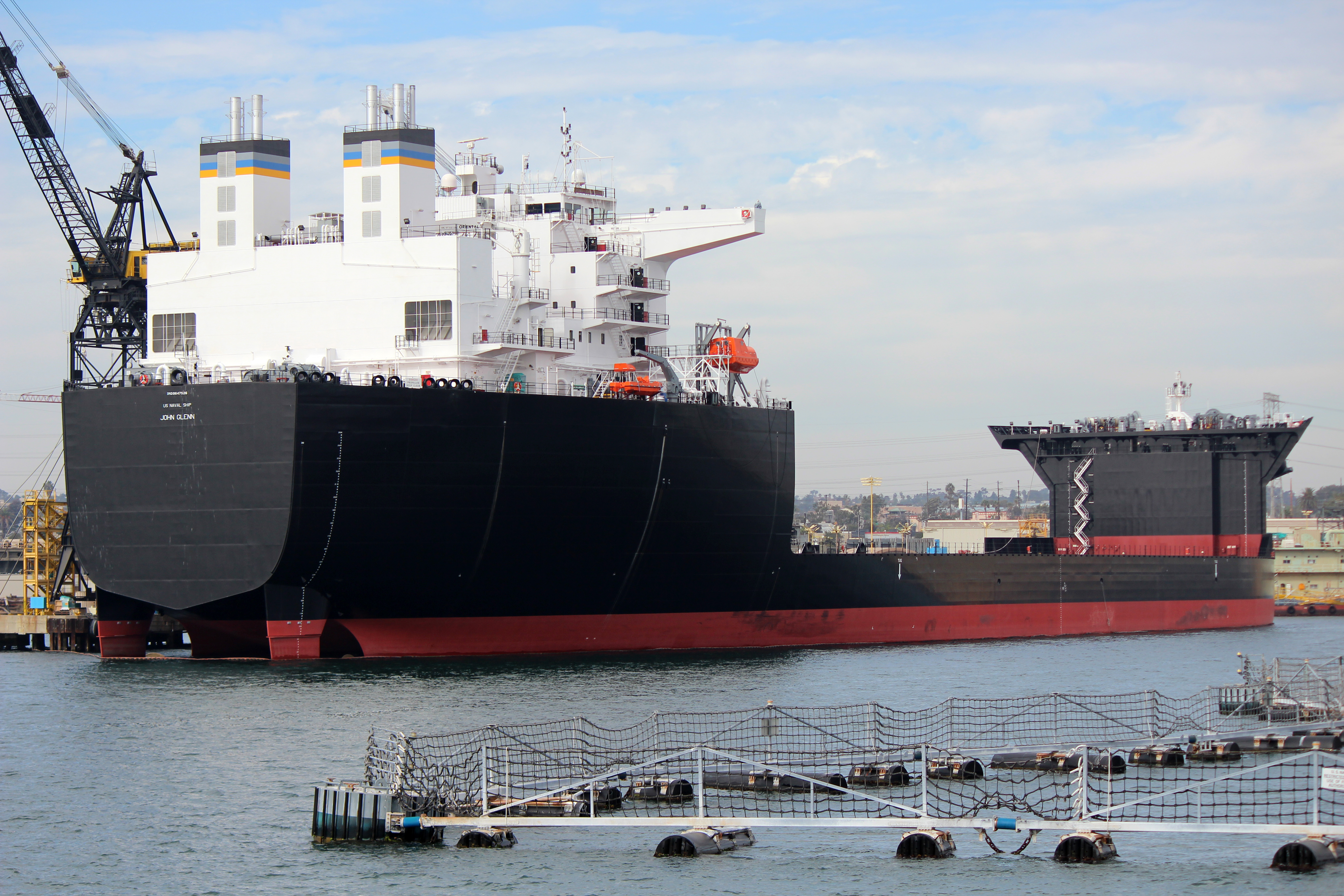
ESD John Glenn at NASSCO, in San Diego

In August 2010, the National Steel and Shipbuilding Company in San Diego was awarded a US$115 million contract to design the Mobile Landing Platform, and build the first ship. Construction on the first vessel began in July 2011.

By January 2016, the names for the four ships were announced: The name for the fifth ship was announced in November 2017

=== List of ships ===
Prefix	Name	Hull No.	Notes
Montford Point class (ESD-variant)
USNS	Montford Point	T-ESD-1	Active, Reduced Operating Status, 23 February 2022
USNS	John Glenn	T-ESD-2	Active, Reduced Operating Status, 10 January 2020
Lewis B. Puller subclass (ESB-variant)
USS	Lewis B. Puller	ESB-3	Commissioned: 17 August 2017
USS	Hershel "Woody" Williams	ESB-4	Commissioned: 7 March 2020
USS	Miguel Keith	ESB-5	Commissioned: 8 May 2021
USS	John L. Canley	ESB-6	Commissioned: 17 February 2024
USS	Robert E. Simanek	ESB-7	Delivered: 12 September 2024
USS	Hector A. Cafferata Jr.	ESB-8	Undergoing sea trials

Orders for the second and third vessels were made in the 2013 and 2015 fiscal years. The keel for the first Montford Point-class Expeditionary Transfer Dock was laid on 19 January 2012. Construction of John Glenn begin on 17 April 2012, by which time the Montford Point was 48% complete. The Montford Point was christened in San Diego on March 2, 2013. Montford Point completed final contract trials on 13 September 2013; John Glenn was floated off on 15 September and construction began on Lewis B. Puller on 19 September 2013.

In March 2012, the USN requested a fourth ship in the FY14 budget of the National Defense Sealift Fund, and proposed that both T-ESB-3 and T-ESB-4 would be ESD-ESB variants. Congress rejected both requests on the grounds that Ponce could do the job and ESBs should in any case be funded out of the main Navy account. As of March 2013 the Chief of Naval Operations was still planning to buy two ESD and two ESD-ESB variants despite the uncertainty caused by the sequester, in fact the late-2012 "Vision for the 2025 Surface Fleet" by the head of Naval Surface Forces envisages buying more MLP variants as a cheap alternative to traditional amphibious ships.

On 19 December 2014, U.S. Navy's Naval Sea Systems Command announced the construction of the second ESB variant, the then-unnamed T-ESB-4. This vessel would be built at the NASSCO shipyard in San Diego, California, with a scheduled completion date of 2018. It was anticipated that T-ESB-4 would be assigned to the Pacific Ocean, and like the other ESD ships, will be operated by the Military Sealift Command. In January 2016, it was announced that T-ESB-4 would be named USNS Hershel "Woody" Williams, after a World War II Marine Corps infantryman who earned a Medal of Honor in the Battle of Iwo Jima. Construction of the ship began in October 2015. It was christened on 21 October 2017 and delivered to Military Sealift Command on 22 February 2018 and entered service the same day.

ESB-5, the fifth vessel in the class, and the third ESB variant, began construction in January 2017 at NASSCO.

== Ship re-designation ==
Effective 4 September 2015, U.S. Secretary of the Navy Ray Mabus officially announced the creation of a new ship designation, "E" for expeditionary support. Joint High Speed Vessel (JHSV) will be called Expeditionary Fast Transport, or EPF; the Mobile Landing Platform (MLP) will be called Expeditionary Transfer Dock, or ESD; and the Afloat Forward Staging Base (AFSB) variant of the MLP will be called Expeditionary Mobile Base, or ESB. The new designation was pursuant to a memorandum sent to Secretary Mabus from Chief of Naval Operations Admiral Jonathan Greenert dated 31 August 2015.

== Commissioning ==
In January 2020, the Navy announced that it will commission all ESBs as warships, meaning they will carry the prefix USS, following the 2017 commissioning of Lewis B. Puller. As a result, they will be crewed by a mix of Navy sailors and civilian mariners from Military Sealift Command. Navy spokesman Lieutenant Tim Pietrack told USNI News: "This re-designation provides combatant commanders greater operational flexibility to employ this platform in accordance with the laws of armed conflict. The Secretary of the Navy approved the commissioning of all ESBs following feedback from the employment of ESB-3 and expected employment of subsequent ships of the class. Prior to commissioning, the ESB class was limited to defensive actions during times governed by the laws of armed conflict. Post-commissioning, these ships have greater mission flexibility throughout the [range of military operations].

=== Proposed ESD retirement ===
In mid-2022, the Marine Corps announced its intent to retire the two ESD ships. Although they were cheap to buy compared to amphibious assault ships and demonstrated seabasing concepts, they are limited to connecting with sealift vessels at wave heights below three feet, and payload, fuel capacity and accommodation space were reduced to cut costs. This led to the decision to retire the ships to prioritize other vessels, such as the more successful ESBs. The proposed retirement of the two ESDs was rejected by Congress in December 2022.

== See also ==
- IRIS Makran - an Iranian forward base ship
- MV Ocean Trader - an American forward base ship used by special forces
- USS Inchon - amphibious ship converted in 1996 to something like an ESB.
- Chinese semi-submersible ship Yinmahu - Often compared to the ESD
