= National Steel and Shipbuilding Company =

Shipyard in San Diego, CA, USA

Coordinates: 32.690163°N 117.139277°W

- Type: Subsidiary
- Industry: Shipbuilding
- Founded: 1905; 121 years ago
- Headquarters: San Diego, California, US
- Number of locations: San Diego, California; Norfolk, Virginia; Mayport, Florida; Bremerton, Washington
- Key people: David Carver (president)
- Parent: General Dynamics
- Website: www.nassco.com

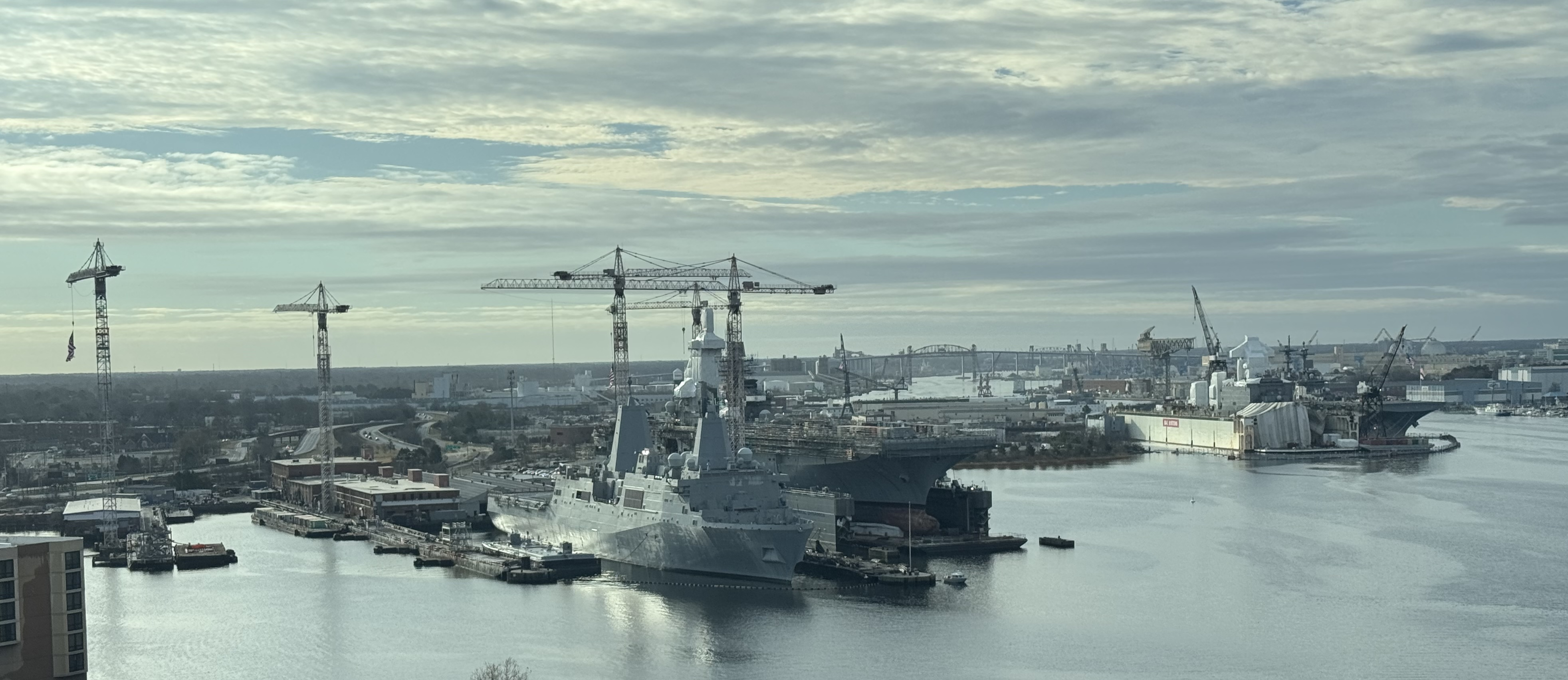
NASSCO's Norfolk shipyard

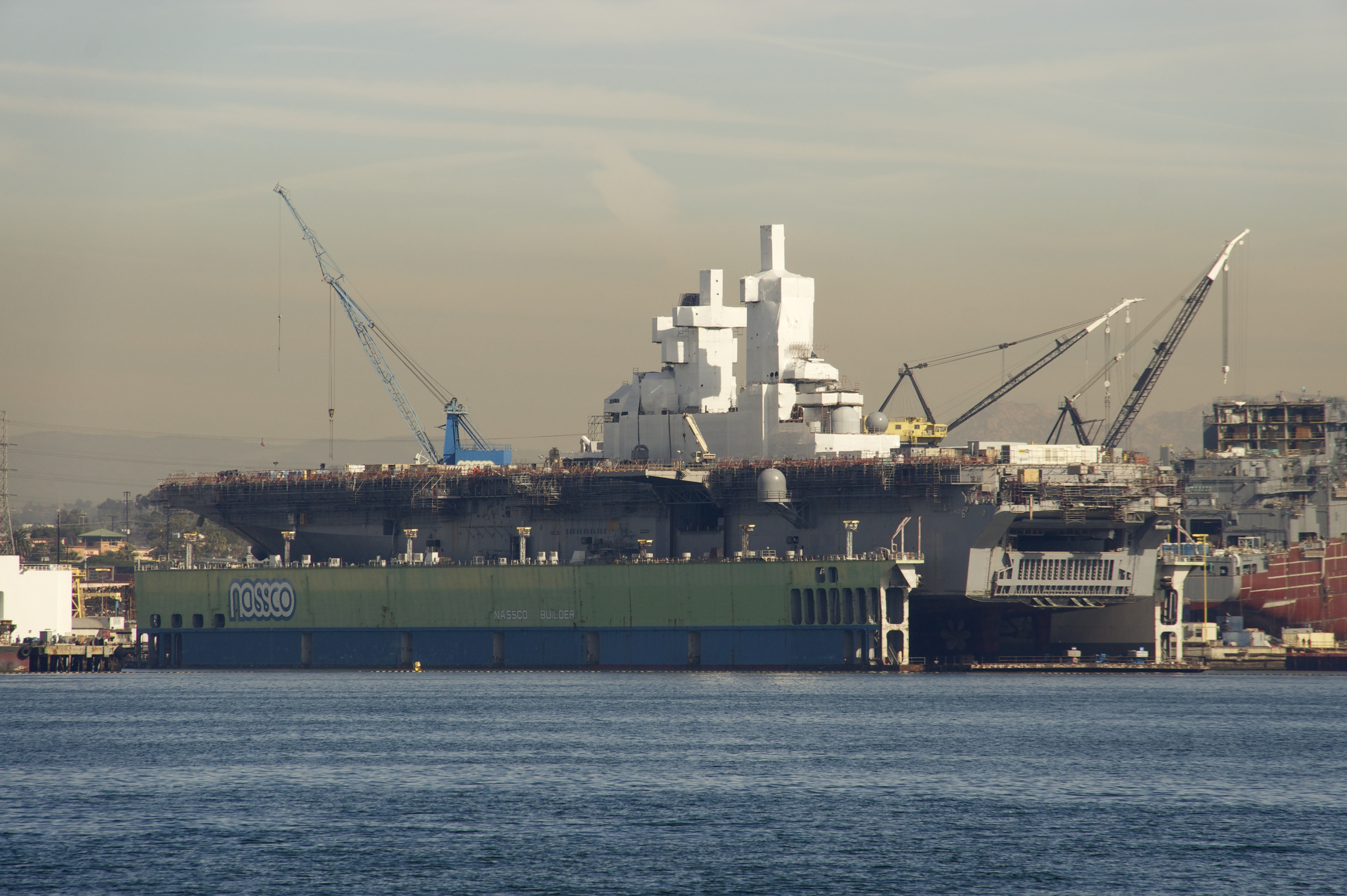
The amphibious assault ship USS Bonhomme Richard (LHD-6) in dry dock at NASSCO shipyard in San Diego. The 840-foot ship is the largest that can be accommodated in NASSCO's drydock.

National Steel and Shipbuilding Company (NASSCO) is an American shipbuilding company with four shipyards located in San Diego, Norfolk, Bremerton, and Mayport. It is a division of General Dynamics. The San Diego shipyard specializes in constructing commercial cargo ships and auxiliary vessels for the US Navy and Military Sealift Command; it is the only new-construction shipyard on the West Coast of the United States. NASSCO performs ship repairs and conversions for the United States Navy in all four shipyard locations: San Diego, Norfolk, Bremerton, and Mayport.

== History ==
The origin of NASSCO traces to 1905 and a small machine shop and foundry known as California Iron Works. In 1922 California Iron Works was taken over by United States National Bank of San Diego (USNB) and renamed National Iron Works. In 1933, USNB was bought by C. Arnholt Smith who thereby also took control of National Iron Works, which formed the first foundation of Smith's non-banking business activities in San Diego. USNB and National Iron Works were key elements in Smith's rise to becoming a San Diego business and political powerbroker in subsequent decades, including being first owner of the San Diego Padres. National Iron Works came with a shipyard, which expanded significantly during World War II.

In 1944 National Iron Works moved to its present location at 28th Street and Harbor Drive on San Diego Bay and in 1949 the company was renamed National Steel and Shipbuilding Co. to reflect the shipyard. National Iron Works built some important San Diego structures, such as some of the plants in which Convair manufactured aircraft for World War II. In this way, Smith came to have an interest in real estate and hotels. After the war, the shipyard made some of the first steel-hulled deep-sea purse seiner tuna boats, through which Smith consolidated local tuna businesses, controlling both ships and the canneries. These business were grouped into Smith's later holding company, Westgate-California Corporation.

However, in 1959 Smith sold National Steel and Shipbuilding to four other corporations, including Kaiser Industries and Morrison-Knudsen. In 1979 Morrison-Knudsen bought out Kaiser's share, and in 1989 management acquired the company from Morrison-Knudsen via an employee stock ownership plan.

In 1940 the company's ironworkers organized into a union. By 1979 the company had 7,900 employees organized into six unions. There was a labor strike in 1988 in which employees demanded a minimum wage of $12 per hour. A 25-day strike in 1992 resulted in workers returning to work without a contract. In 1996, a further strike hit the company. Around 2,700 employees stayed home while 50 marched in front of the company with picket signs.

In 1991, NASSCO established the subsidiary manufacturing facility of Tecnologias Internacionales de Manufactura, S.A. de C.V. (TIMSA) located in Mexicali, Mexico.

In 1998 General Dynamics bought NASSCO in a $415 million deal.

On October 31, 2011, General Dynamics-NASSCO acquired Metro Machine Corp, a surface-ship repair company in Norfolk, Virginia, and renamed it NASSCO-Norfolk. The company had been conducting ship repairs and conversions for the U.S. Navy since 1972. NASSCO-Norfolk has two locations in Norfolk and Portsmouth VA. The NASSCO-Norfolk shipyard had the newest dry dock in the country, with two auto-start generators, automated ballast control system and automated ship hauling and centering system.

In December of 2014, NASSCO established NASSCO-Bremerton in Washington and NASSCO-Mayport in Florida, in support of expanding NASSCO's Repair capabilities across the nation.

== Work done ==
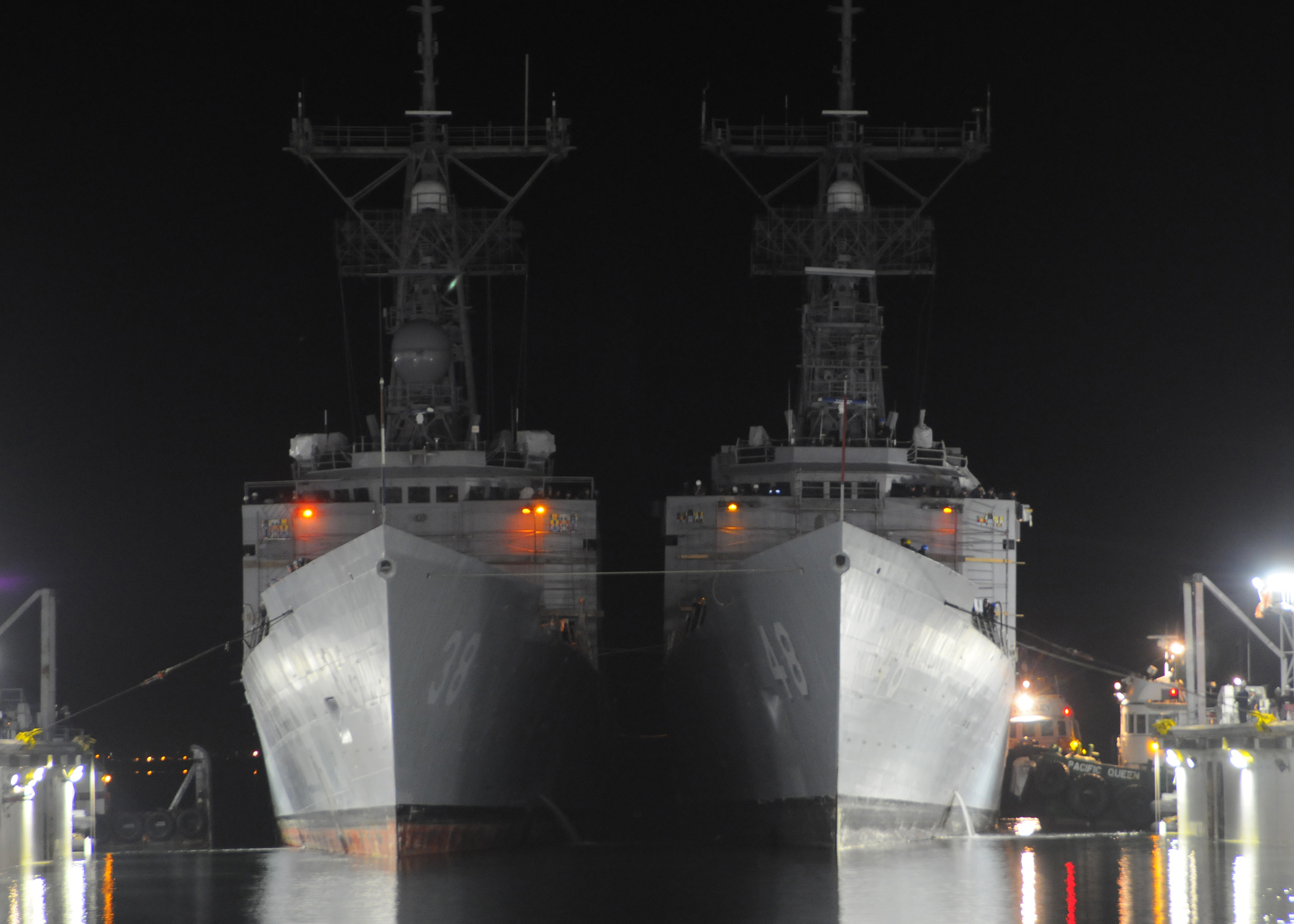
The guided-missile frigates USS Vandegrift (FFG-48) and USS Curts (FFG-38) conduct a double dry-docking at NASSCO

NASSCO began building commercial cargo ships in 1959, eventually including large cargo ships and Alaska-class oil tankers. Its most famous commercial ship was the Exxon Valdez tanker, which completed construction at NASSCO in 1986, and in 1989 returned to NASSCO for repairs after its accident and oil spill in Alaska. In December 2012 the company signed a contract to build two 764-foot (233 m) container ships powered by liquefied natural gas (LNG). When completed they will be the largest LNG-powered ships of any kind in the world.

Beginning in the 1990s the company won Navy contracts to build AOE-10 support ships, strategic sealift ships, and TOTE Orca-class trailerships. Additional Navy contracts awarded during the 2000s included maintenance of the San Diego–based USS Ticonderoga (CG-47) and USS Spruance (DD-963) warships. In 2001 the Navy awarded NASSCO its largest order in company history, to build the Lewis and Clark-class dry cargo ships (T-AKE), a 14-ship program with a contract value of $3.7 billion. The company has a contract to build at least three Mobile Landing Platform ships, a new class of ship for the U.S. Navy. Construction on the first vessel began in July 2011 and the keel was laid for the second in December 2012. In 2016, Matson, Inc ordered two Kanaloa-class freighters, to be delivered near the end of the decade. In 2018, NASSCO began its largest contract to build up to 20 John Lewis class T-AO's. From 2021-2026, NASSCO accomplished the first, second, and third SEWIP modernizations and upgrades to DDG-91, DDG-93, and DDG-95.
