= List of conflicts in Central America =

== Costa Rica ==
- 1921 War of Coto (against Panama)
- 1948 Costa Rican Civil War

== Guatemala ==
- 1524 — 1697 Spanish conquest of Guatemala

Date	Event	Modern department (or Mexican state)
February – March 1524	Spanish defeat the K'iche'	Retalhuleu, Suchitepéquez, Quetzaltenango, Totonicapán and El Quiché
8 February 1524	Battle of Zapotitlán, Spanish victory over the K'iche'	Suchitepéquez
12 February 1524	First battle of Quetzaltenango results in the death of the K'iche' lord Tecun Uman	Quetzaltenango
18 February 1524	Second battle of Quetzaltenango	Quetzaltenango
March 1524	Spanish under Pedro de Alvarado raze Q'umarkaj, capital of the K'iche'	El Quiché
14 April 1524	Spanish enter Iximche and ally themselves with the Kaqchikel	Chimaltenango
18 April 1524	Spanish defeat the Tz'utujil in battle on the shores of Lake Atitlán	Sololá
9 May 1524	Pedro de Alvarado defeats the Pipil of Panacal or Panacaltepeque near Izcuintepeque	Escuintla
26 May 1524	Pedro de Alvarado defeats the Xinca of Atiquipaque	Santa Rosa
27 July 1524	Iximche declared first colonial capital of Guatemala	Chimaltenango
28 August 1524	Kaqchikel abandon Iximche and break alliance	Chimaltenango
7 September 1524	Spanish declare war on the Kaqchikel	Chimaltenango
1525	The Poqomam capital falls to Pedro de Alvarado	Guatemala
13 March 1525	Hernán Cortés arrives at Lake Petén Itzá	Petén
October 1525	Zaculeu, capital of the Mam, surrenders to Gonzalo de Alvarado y Contreras after a lengthy siege	Huehuetenango
1526	Chajoma rebel against the Spanish	Guatemala
1526	Acasaguastlán given in encomienda to Diego Salvatierra	El Progreso
1526	Spanish captains sent by Alvarado conquer Chiquimula	Chiquimula
9 February 1526	Spanish deserters burn Iximche	Chimaltenango
1527	Spanish abandon their capital at Tecpán Guatemala	Chimaltenango
1529	San Mateo Ixtatán given in encomienda to Gonzalo de Ovalle	Huehuetenango
September 1529	Spanish routed at Uspantán	El Quiché
April 1530	Rebellion in Chiquimula put down	Chiquimula
9 May 1530	Kaqchikel surrender to the Spanish	Sacatepéquez
December 1530	Ixil and Uspantek surrender to the Spanish	El Quiché
April 1533	Juan de León y Cardona founds San Marcos and San Pedro Sacatepéquez	San Marcos
1543	Foundation of Cobán	Alta Verapaz
1549	First reductions of the Chuj and Q'anjob'al	Huehuetenango
1551	Corregimiento of San Cristóbal Acasaguastlán established	El Progreso, Zacapa and Baja Verapaz
1555	Lowland Maya kill Francisco de Vico	Alta Verapaz
1560	Reduction of Topiltepeque and Lakandon Ch'ol	Alta Verapaz
1618	Franciscan missionaries arrive at Nojpetén, capital of the Itzá	Petén
1619	Further missionary expeditions to Nojpetén	Petén
1684	Reduction of San Mateo Ixtatán and Santa Eulalia	Huehuetenango
29 January 1686	Melchor Rodríguez Mazariegos leaves Huehuetenango, leading an expedition against the Lacandón	Huehuetenango
1695	Franciscan friar Andrés de Avendaño attempts to convert the Itzá	Petén
28 February 1695	Spanish expeditions leave simultaneously from Cobán, San Mateo Ixtatán and Ocosingo against the Lacandón	Alta Verapaz, Huehuetenango and Chiapas
1696	Andrés de Avendaño forced to flee Nojpetén	Petén
13 March 1697	Nojpetén falls to the Spanish after a fierce battle	Petén

- 1530 Alvarado enslaves the Mayan kingdoms of Cakchiquel, Mam, and Ixil.
- 1811 1811 Independence Movement
- 1823 — 1838 Federal Republic of Central America independence and annexation by the Mexican Empire
- 1896 — 1898 Greater Republic of Central America
- 1960 — 1996 Central American crisis
  - 1960 — 1996 Guatemalan Civil War

== Nicaragua ==
- 1898 — 1934 Banana Wars
  - September 19, 1912 Battle of Masaya
  - October 3, 1912 — October 4, 1912 Battle of Coyotepe Hill
  - May 16, 1927 Battle of La Paz Centro
  - July 16, 1927 Battle of Ocotal
  - July 25, 1927 Battle of San Fernando
  - July 27, 1927 Battle of Santa Clara
  - September 19, 1927 Battle of Telpaneca
  - October 9, 1927 Battle of Sapotillal
  - January 1, 1928 Battle of Las Cruces
  - February 27, 1928 — February 28, 1928 Battle of El Bramadero
  - May 13, 1928 — May 14, 1928 Battle of La Flor
  - December 31, 1930 Battle of Achuapa
  - September 16, 1932 Battle of Agua Carta
  - December 26, 1932 Battle of El Sauce
- 1926 — 1927 Nicaraguan civil war
- 1960 — 1996 Central American crisis
  - 1961 — 1990 Nicaraguan Revolution

== El Salvador ==
- 1885 Barrios' War of Reunification
- 1969 Football War
- 1960–1996 Central American crisis
  - 1979–1992 Salvadoran Civil War
- 2022–present Salvadoran gang crackdown

== Honduras ==
- 1860 — 1861 Priest War
- 1898 — 1931 Banana Wars
  - 1903 — Honduran armed conflict of 1903
  - 1907 — Honduran armed conflict of 1907
  - 1919 — First Honduran Civil War
  - 1924 — Second Honduran Civil War
  - 1924 — Honduran armed uprising of 1824
  - 1931 — Third Honduran civil war
- 1957 — Morocón War
- 1969 — Football War
- 1979 — 1996 Central American crisis
  - 1982 — 1986 Battalion 3-16 was responsible for the kidnapping, torture, disappearance and murder of at least 184 Honduran students, professors, journalists, human rights activists and others
- 2022–present Honduran gang crackdown

== Panama ==
- 1921 War of Coto (against Costa Rica)
- 1960 — 1996 Central American crisis
  - 1989 — 1990 United States invasion of Panama
    - December 20, 1989 Operation Acid Gambit
    - December 23, 1989 Operation Nifty Package

== Belize ==
- 1981 Heads of Agreement Crisis

== See also ==
- List of conflicts in North America
- List of conflicts in South America
- List of conflicts in Europe
- List of conflicts in Africa
- List of conflicts in Asia
- List of conflicts in the Near East
- List of conflicts in the Middle East
- List of wars
- Central America
- History of Central America
