= Weapons officer =

Weapons officer may refer to:

- United States Air Force weapons officer, a graduate of the USAF Weapons School
- Infantry weapons officer, a United States Marine Corps chief warrant officer who is a technical weapons specialist
- Weapon systems officer (WSO), either a United States Navy air flight officer directly involved in all air operations and weapon systems of a fighter aircraft or the aft crew member in a United States Air Force F-15E Strike Eagle or B-1 Lancer or a United States Marine Corps F/A-18D Hornet
- Gunnery officer, (or weapons officer), a naval officer responsible for operation and maintenance of a warship's guns and for safe storage of the shipboard ammunition inventory
