= William A. Lee =

US Marine Corps colonel (1900–1998)

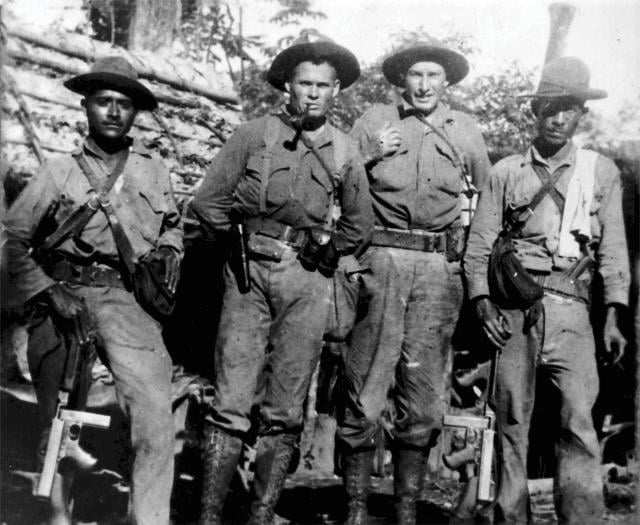
- First Lieutenant Lewis "Chesty" Puller (center left) with Lee (center right) and two Nicaraguan soldiers in 1931
- Born: November 12, 1900; Ward Hill, Massachusetts, U.S.
- Died: December 27, 1998 (aged 98); Fredericksburg, Virginia, U.S.
- Burial place: Quantico National Cemetery
- Military career
- Allegiance: United States
- Branch: United States Marine Corps
- Service years: 1918–1919; 1921–1950
- Rank: Colonel
- Nickname: "Ironman"
- Conflicts: World War I Banana Wars: Occupation of Nicaragua; Battle of Agua Carta; Battle of El Sauce; World War II
- Awards: Navy Cross (3); Purple Heart (3)

William Andrew "Ironman" Lee (November 12, 1900 – December 27, 1998) was a highly decorated officer in the United States Marine Corps with the rank of colonel. He was the recipient of three Navy Crosses during the Banana Wars, and later became a prisoner of war during World War II.

== Early Marine Corps career ==
William Andrew Lee was born in Ward Hill, Massachusetts, on November 12, 1900 to Eda Gustava (née Peterson) and Benjamin Rufus Lee.

On May 22, 1918, Lee attempted to enlist in the Army, but he was turned away because he was only 17. He then went to the Marine recruiting station and was told he would need his father to sign for him. Lee found the first man he saw outside the office and had him pose as his father and sign the paperwork.

Lee attended boot camp at Marine Corps Recruit Depot Parris Island. Private Lee then reported to machine gun school in Utica, New York, before deploying to France with Company K, 13th Regiment, 5th Marine Brigade in September 1918 during World War I. Lee rose to the rank of corporal before he left the Marines upon returning to the United States in August 1919.

Lee reenlisted in the Marines in September 1921 and served with his brother, George Lee, aboard the USS Arkansas for five years. By April 1925, he was promoted to gunnery sergeant and became the Heavyweight Boxing Champion of the fleet. Lee also became well known as an expert marksman with nearly every weapon he fired.

== Banana Wars ==
In early 1927, Gunnery Sergeant Lee was sent to Nicaragua where he assisted in training Nicaraguan National Guard soldiers and led them into combat against the leftist Sandinista rebels. Throughout the year of 1930, he led Guardia patrols into action against rebels in nine engagements. Lee's patrols were often outnumbered, but succeeded in routing the bandits in every battle. Gunnery Sergeant Lee was awarded his first two Navy Crosses during this time.

In September 1932, Lee and First Lieutenant Chesty Puller were leading a patrol of 40 Nicaraguans when they were ambushed by nearly 150 rebels. Lee was shot in the head and lost consciousness while Puller led the patrol in a counterattack against the rebels. After about 15 minutes, Lee regained consciousness and manned a Lewis Gun with destructive effect against the enemy. After defeating the enemy ambush, Lee and Puller withdrew their force back to their base over 100 miles away. Lee was awarded his third Navy Cross for his actions, Puller was awarded his second Navy Cross.

In January 1933, Lee returned to the United States and spent six months in a naval hospital in Washington, D.C. In June 1934 he was assigned to the 5th Marines in Quantico, Virginia, and was soon promoted to Chief Marine Gunner.

== World War II ==
=== China Marine ===
In August 1939, Chief Marine Gunner Lee reported to the U.S. Embassy in Beiping (now Beijing), China. As tensions rose between the United States and Japan, most China Marines (Note: The term "China Marines" referred to the United States Marines of the 4th Marine Regiment, who were stationed in Shanghai, China from 1927 to 1941 to protect American citizens and their property. (From Wikipedia article China Marines)) were relocated to the Philippines. However, Lee and approximately 200 other Marines stayed in China.

On December 7, 1941, the Imperial Japanese Navy attacked Pearl Harbor and the United States declared war the next day, officially entering into World War II. On December 8, Lee and 21 other Marines were stockpiling supplies at the Qinhuangdao docks and were scheduled to be evacuated by ship just two days later. Unfortunately, the detachment of Marines were surrounded by an overwhelming Japanese force. Lee and the Marines were preparing to make a final stand when they received orders to surrender. Every single Marine still in China surrendered as a prisoner of war by the Japanese.

=== Prisoner of war ===
On February 2, 1942, Lee and the other China Marines were taken to the Wusong prisoner-of-war (POW) camp, near Shanghai. The Marines were fed very little and routinely beaten, and they were housed in dilapidated barracks did little to protect them from the elements during the winter. An electric fence also surrounded the camp, which electrocuted a few men who accidentally touched it. In December 1942, Lee and most of the other POWs were transferred to Jiangwang, several miles away. The conditions at Jiangwang were slightly better than those at Wusong.

In May 1945, Lee and the other prisoners were transported by train 100 miles to Nanjing. By May 14, the prisoners were put in a warehouse outside Beiping, where the conditions were worse than previous camps. On June 19, the POWs were put onto another train and travelled to Pusan, Korea, where the conditions were even worse than the conditions at Beiping. After three days, they were loaded onto a ferry and sent to the island of Honshu, Japan.

Lee and the other prisoners then got on another train which took them north, before ultimately getting on another ferry which took them to Hokkaido, where they would spend the rest of the war. Lee was beaten very badly numerous times during his captivity, as the Japanese largely focused on him due to his size and leadership role. On one occasion, a Japanese soldier kicked his teeth out. Lit cigarettes were also put out on his ears in several incidents.

In August 1945, many of the Japanese guards fled the camp after the bombings of Hiroshima and Nagasaki. Lee and several other Marines killed some of the remaining Japanese guards and captured the camp, holding it until their liberation by American troops in September 1945. Lee and the other Marines from the embassy were the longest held American prisoners of war during World War II.

== Post-World War II ==
Lee was promoted to second lieutenant and arrived in San Francisco, California, on September 22, 1945. By July 1946, he was promoted to lieutenant colonel. He was given command of a rifle range at Camp Lejeune, North Carolina for the next four years. In the Spring of 1949, his wife, Helen Winifred (née Lloyd) Lee (the daughter of Marine Gunner Calvin A. Lloyd), died in a fall.

Lee retired at the rank of colonel on July 1, 1950. He later tried to return to the Marines as the United States became involved in the Korean War, but his offer was declined.

William A. Lee died of cancer on December 27, 1998, at the age of 98, in Fredericksburg, Virginia. He was survived by his second wife, Anne (née Bradbury) Lee, and four daughters. Of William Lee's life, Anne Lee captured his accomplishments with these words: “One man just can’t do all he has done in one lifetime, but he did.” He is buried in Quantico National Cemetery.

== Honors ==
In 1992, the Marines named a rifle range in Lee's honour. During the ceremony at the $5.5 million range, Lee fired and hit nine moving targets with an M-16 rifle.

During his military service he was awarded the following medals:

- Navy Cross (3)
- Purple Heart (3)
- Nicaraguan Medals of Valour(Cruz de Valour) with Palm (2)
- Prisoner of War medal
