= Bennie M. Bunn =

Bennie Maurice Bunn
- Born: November 10, 1907; Charles City, Iowa, US
- Died: July 10, 1943 (aged 35) New Georgia
- Buried: Foans National Cemetery; San Diego, California
- Allegiance: United States
- Branch: United States Marine Corps
- Service years: 1927–1943
- Rank: First Lieutenant
- Conflicts: Banana Wars: Occupation of Nicaragua; Battle of El Bramadero; Battle of El Sauce; World War II: Battle of Enogai
- Awards: Navy Cross; Distinguished Service Cross; Purple Heart

Bennie Maurice Bunn (November 7, 1907 – July 10, 1943) was a highly decorated United States Marine Corps officer.

== Early life and "banana wars" ==
Bennie M. Bunn was born in Charles City, Iowa, on November 9, 1907. He graduated from Charles City High School and enlisted in the Marines in 1927. In February 1928, Private Bunn participated in the battle of El Bromadero in Nicaragua. He was then assigned to the USS Augusta while the ship was completing its shakedown cruise.

On December 26, 1932, Corporal Bunn was a member of a Nicaraguan National Guard patrol which was on board a train heading towards El Sauce. When they were attacked by a large bandit force, Bunn exited the wrong side of the train and found several bandits right in front of him. He quickly used well-aimed fire from a Thompson submachine gun to break up the attack, personally killing 10 bandits. For his actions, he was awarded the Navy Cross.

Bunn was later assigned to Shanghai, China, prior to World War II. Bunn was also a member of the Marine Corps rifle team and won shooting matches at Camp Perry, Ohio in 1938.

== World War II and death ==
In early 1942, Gunnery Sergeant Bunn was promoted to Warrant Officer. He joined the Marine Raiders and was soon promoted to First Lieutenant.

On July 10, 1943, Lieutenant Bunn took part in the battle of Enogai in New Georgia, Solomon Islands. He led several Marines in an assault up a bluff against a Japanese heavy machine gun emplacement. Despite being wounded several times while charging the position, he killed the operators of the machine gun with grenades and his pistol, and then used the captured machine gun to lay devastating fire on subsequent enemy positions. He later succumbed to his wounds. For his actions, First Lieutenant Bunn was awarded the Distinguished Service Cross.

Lieutenant Bunn's body was carried back down the hill and interred in a military cemetery on the island. He was later permanently buried at Fort Rosecrans National Cemetery in San Diego, California. Camp Bunn, which offered jungle warfare training during the war, was named in his honor.
