= Chesty Puller =

United States Marine Corps general (1898–1971)

Lewis Burwell Puller
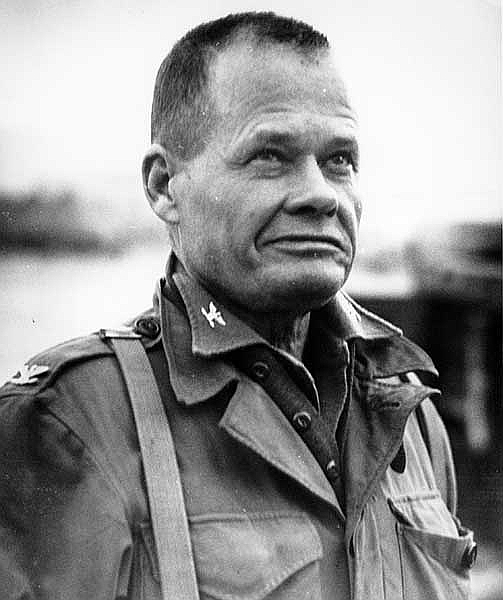
- Puller in 1950
- Born: June 26, 1898; West Point, Virginia, U.S.
- Died: October 11, 1971 (aged 73); Hampton, Virginia, U.S.
- Burial place: Christ Church Cemetery; Christchurch, Virginia, U.S.
- Spouse: Virginia Montague Evans
- Children: 3, including Lewis Burwell Puller Jr.
- Military career
- Allegiance: United States
- Branch: United States Marine Corps
- Service years: 1918–1955
- Rank: Lieutenant General
- Nickname: "Chesty"
- Unit: 1st Marine Division
- Commands: 2nd Marine Division; 3rd Marine Division; 1st Marines; 1st Battalion, 7th Marines; 2nd Battalion, 4th Marines
- Conflicts: See list: World War I; Banana Wars; Occupation of Haiti; Occupation of Nicaragua; Battle of Agua Carta; Battle of El Sauce; World War II; Guadalcanal campaign; Actions along the Matanikau; Battle for Henderson Field; Operation Cartwheel; New Britain campaign; Battle of Cape Gloucester; Mariana and Palau Islands campaign; Battle of Peleliu; Korean War; Battle of Inchon; Second Battle of Seoul; Battle of Chosin Reservoir
- Awards: Navy Cross (5); Distinguished Service Cross; Silver Star; Legion of Merit w/ "V" Device (2); Bronze Star Medal w/ "V" Device; Air Medal (3); Purple Heart

Lewis Burwell "Chesty" Puller (June 26, 1898 – October 11, 1971) was a United States Marine Corps officer. Beginning his career fighting guerillas in Haiti and Nicaragua as part of the Banana Wars, he later served with distinction in World War II and the Korean War as a senior officer. By the time of his retirement in 1955, he had reached the rank of lieutenant general.

Puller is the most decorated Marine in American history. He was awarded five Navy Crosses and one Distinguished Service Cross. With six crosses, Puller is second behind Eddie Rickenbacker for citations of the nation's second-highest military award for valor. Puller retired from the Marine Corps in 1955, after 37 years of service. He lived in Virginia and died in 1971 at age 73.

== Early life ==
Puller was born in West Point, Virginia, to Matthew and Martha Puller. Puller was of English ancestry; his ancestors who came to America emigrated to the colony of Virginia from Bedfordshire, England in 1621. His father was a grocer who died when Puller was 10 years old. Puller grew up listening to old veterans' tales of the American Civil War and idolizing Thomas "Stonewall" Jackson. He wanted to enlist in the United States Army to fight in the Border War with Mexico in 1916, but he was too young and could not get parental consent from his mother.

== World War I ==
In 1917, Puller attended the Virginia Military Institute but left in August 1918 as World War I was still ongoing, saying that he wanted to "go where the guns are!" Inspired by the 5th Marines at Belleau Wood, he enlisted in the United States Marine Corps as a private and attended boot camp at the Marine Corps Recruit Depot, Parris Island, South Carolina.

Although he never saw action in that war, the Marine Corps was expanding, and soon after graduating he attended its non-commissioned officer school and Officer Candidates School (OCS) at Quantico, Virginia. Graduating from OCS on June 16, 1919, Puller was appointed second lieutenant in the reserves, but the reduction in force from 73,000 to 1,100 officers and 27,400 men following the war led to his being put on inactive status 10 days later and given the rank of corporal.

== Interwar years ==
=== United States occupation of Haiti ===
Corporal Puller received orders to serve in the Gendarmerie d'Haiti as a lieutenant, seeing action in Haiti. While the United States was working under a treaty with Haiti, he participated in over forty engagements during the ensuing five years against the Caco rebels and attempted to regain his commission as an officer twice. In 1922, he served as an adjutant to Major Alexander Vandegrift, a future commandant of the Marine Corps.

==== Supply run ====
Puller received orders to deliver supplies to Mirebalais and Lascahobas. These two small towns were located in a region where there was a significant presence of Caco guerrillas under the command of Benoît Batraville, who was a high ranking insurgent leader. Puller's supply party consisted of twenty-five mounted Haitian gendarmes along with the pack animals. Puller kept his force moving rapidly to avoid risking an ambush or night attack by the Caco.

Later on, the small force of gendarmes led by Puller ran into an equally surprised column of about one hundred Cacos coming from the opposite direction around a bend in the road. Puller ordered a charge and spurred his horse forward to attack the Cacos. The gendarmes charged beside him and scattered the Cacos, who used guerilla tactics and therefore seldom stood their ground if attacked by a significant force. The Cacos fired a handful of shots at the onrushing American-led gendarmes and then dispersed to make pursuit more difficult. With the burden of the pack mules, Puller could not pursue the evasive Cacos. After the clash ended, one dead Caco bandit was found.

This skirmish was Puller's first engagement in the occupation and showed his adeptness at aggressive action and effective leadership from the front. Puller and his force of gendarmes reached Mirebalais and delivered the supplies needed by the town. The next day, Puller made a 34-hour round trip to Lascahobas to deliver the final supplies and then returned to Port-au-Prince completing his supply run.

==== Ambushing the Cacos ====
Puller was assigned a new duty to begin offensive operations against the Cacos. Puller inherited a force of one hundred gendarmes who were supported unofficially by about the same number of female camp followers. Puller's assigned chief assistant was acting Second Lieutenant Augustin B. Brunot, a Haitian who was fluent in English. Other pro-American Haitians added to Puller's force were newly commissioned lieutenants Lyautey and Brunot, and a Haitian private named Jean Louis Cermontout, who Puller recruited with the promise of promotion after seeing him return from a successful patrol with the severed heads of two Cacos bandits.

Brunot and Lyautey advised Puller on how to combat the Cacos insurgents. They advised him that daylight patrols had little chance of encountering the Cacos, as they hid during the day, only emerging from hiding to ambush government patrols if they had superior numbers. Chance encounters such as Puller's supply run were rare because the Cacos knew the terrain and had good intelligence of constabulary activities. They advised him that the Cacos encamped at night and that night patrols would have a better chance of surprising them. When Puller and his unit, following this advice, patrolled along a ridge-top trail one night, he observed campfires and heard drums nearby. Puller with Lyautey and some gendarmes went to scout, while Brunot remained with the rest of the gendarmes. The noise turned out to be a celebration at a Cacos guerrilla encampment. After returning, Puller came up with a plan to ambush the Cacos at dawn.

Puller placed the main body of men in a line facing the bandit camp and sent the smaller crews with three Lewis machine guns to the flank in a position where they covered the enemy rear, setting an L-shaped ambush. After Puller's force of gendarmes got into position, Puller executed the ambush. As Puller had predicted, when the main body of men opened fire at first light, the surprised Cacos bandits fled from the source of immediate danger into the fields of fire of the machine guns, where all seventeen were killed. Dozens of machetes and a large flock of gamecocks were found. Puller and his gendarmes celebrated their victory and feasted on abandoned supplies while using the game cocks for cockfighting. Puller later participated in more patrols as he gained experience and learned the peculiarities of small wars.

==== Further operations against the Cacos, October–November 1919 ====
Puller would conduct more offensive operations to suppress the Cacos. On October 28, 1919, Puller went on a patrol with Brunot and a mixed force of fifteen American marines and gendarmes. They would stay out ten days, at which time another group would relieve them. The unit, using night movements, made contact on October 31 with a small band, killing two of the enemy and capturing four rifles, several machetes, and some swords. On November 1, they arrested three suspected bandits.

==== Infiltrating and raiding a Cacos camp, November 4, 1919 ====
On the afternoon of November 4, 1919, Puller and his men entered a small village of grass shacks ten miles west of Mirebalais. A priest told Brunot that a high ranking Cacos insurgent leader named Dominique Georges had a camp about fifteen miles away. He and his men decided to take this opportunity to kill or capture Dominique Georges. Despite heavy rain, Puller took a small patrol of marines and gendarmes out immediately. Puller, Brunot, and Private Cermontout Jean Louis scouted out ahead of the small column during the night when they came upon the remains of a bonfire, indicating a bandit guard post. A Cacos sentry armed with a rifle challenged Puller's group. The sentry could not see them clearly as it was very dark and his bonfire had been put out by the rain. Brunot replied in his Haitian accent "Cacos", at which the guard let them through. Puller, Brunot, and Jean Louis were able to infiltrate the Cacos camp and came upon a clearing with many huts and lean-tos. Puller and Jean Louis took firing positions on the ground after Puller sent Brunot to gather the rest of the patrol to assault the camp. Puller aimed his rifle at a man he later believed was Georges, but waited for the main attack instead of firing. A Caco challenged the two prone figures, so that Puller had to shoot the Caco, starting the battle. The marines and gendarmes rushed forward, but the estimated two hundred Cacos scattered, with Puller and Jean Louis firing as fast as they could at fleeing figures. After the government forces had possession of the camp, they found one dead Caco. Puller's patrol took twenty seven rifles, swords, and machetes, and several dozen gamecocks. Among the booty was Georges' personal rifle, identified by his initials in the stock. Puller and his patrol spent the night at the camp and then withdrew safely to their base at Mirebalais.

==== Patrol and raid, November 9, 1919 ====
On November 9, Puller and Brunot led a patrol of thirty-three gendarmes. Just before dawn they found a camp and attacked it. This time Puller and his fellow gendarmes killed ten Cacos and captured two rifles. After the raid of the Cacos camp, they safely withdrew to Mirebalais by a circuitous route and fell into garrison routine for a few days.

==== Further patrol operations ====
After the successful assassination of Charlemagne Péralte by Herman H. Hanneken in a raid, Benoît Batraville became the next leader of the Cacos. Puller and Brunot each took a part of the company out on a patrol. Brunot spotted a Caco force that turned out to be Batraville's, but before Brunot could get his force into position for an attack, the Cacos broke camp and melted away. Puller had better luck, with two Cacos killed and sixteen captured.

==== Ending of the fighting in Haiti ====
The Cacos rebellion collapsed altogether when a marine patrol killed Batraville on May 19, 1920. A month later, the last significant Caco leader surrendered. More patrols by the gendarmes and American marines in the following year killed a further eighty-five Cacos. Later on in September 1920, Herman H. Hanneken penetrated a Caco camp in disguise, arresting five chiefs while killing another. By June 1921, a government military commander declared the country to be "completely tranquil."

==== Return to the United States ====
Puller returned stateside and was finally recommissioned as a second lieutenant on March 6, 1924 (Service No. 03158). After completing assignments at the Marine Corps barracks in Norfolk, Virginia; The Basic School in Quantico, Virginia; and with the 10th Marine Artillery Regiment in Quantico, Virginia, he was assigned to the Marine Corps barracks at Pearl Harbor, Hawaii, in July 1926 and in San Diego, California, in 1928.

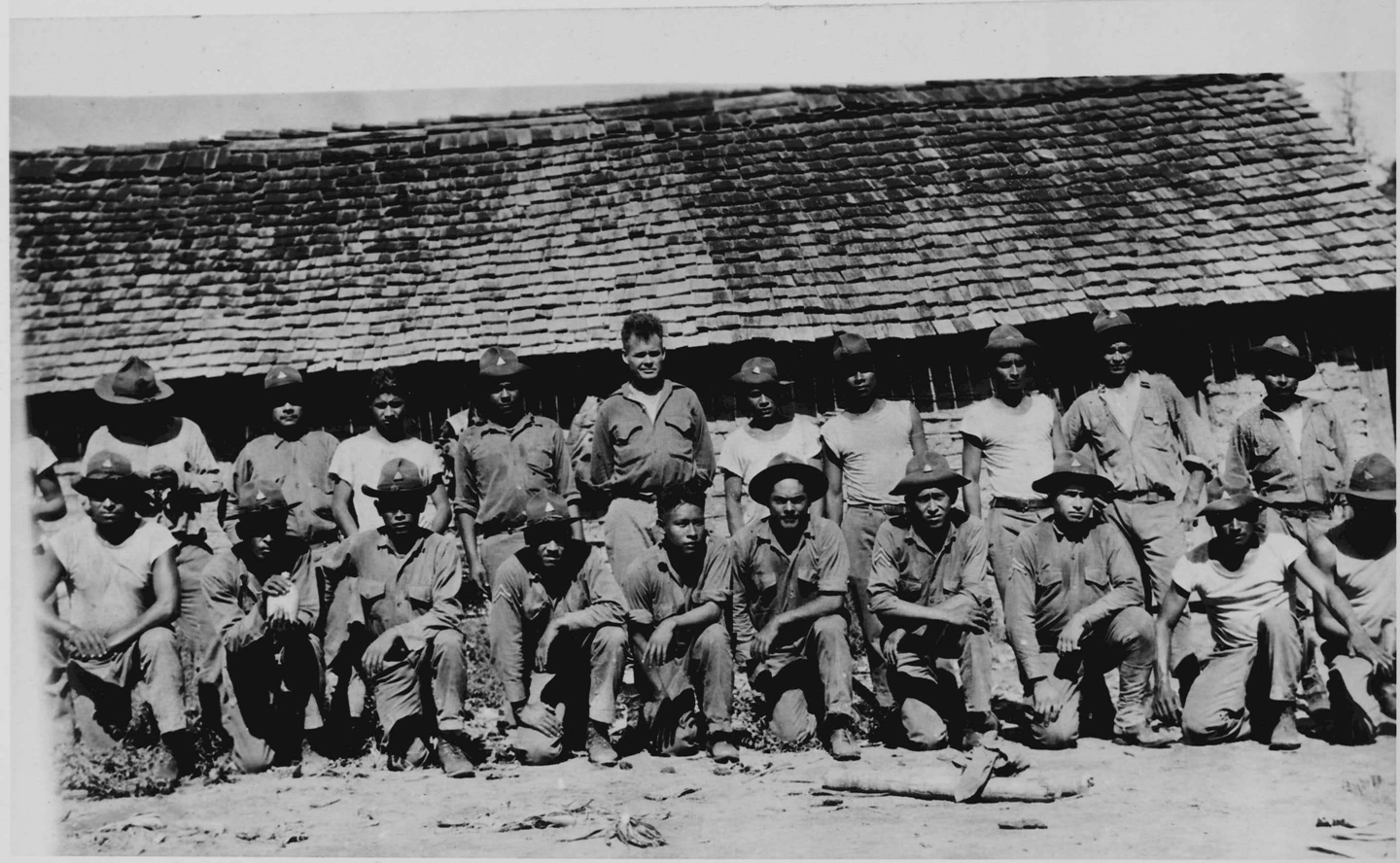
Puller with members of the Guardia Nacional

=== United States occupation of Nicaragua ===
In December 1928, Puller was assigned to the Nicaraguan National Guard detachment, where he was awarded his first Navy Cross for his actions from February 16 to August 19, 1930, when he led "five successive engagements against superior numbers of armed bandit forces." He returned stateside in July 1931 and completed the year-long Company Officers Course at Fort Benning, Georgia, thereafter returning to Nicaragua from September 20 to October 1, 1932, and was awarded a second Navy Cross. Puller led American marines and Nicaraguan national guardsmen into battle against Sandinista rebels in the last major engagement of the Sandino Rebellion near El Sauce on December 26, 1932.

==== Patrolling, June 4–6, 1930 ====
After Puller inherited command of Nicaraguan Guardia Nacional called Company M, he was prepared to conduct operations against the Sandinista rebels, and immediately departed on a patrol. Puller moved eastward for a five-day sweep, but soon received orders to head northeast. The patrol moved by day and camped each night in a village. In the afternoon of June 4, the company was at San Antonio cooking a steer in preparation for a trek into the uninhabited area around Mt. Kilande. After hearing some gunshots to the north, Puller sent thirteen men of the Guardia to investigate a thousand yards beyond the town. The Guardia encountered six rebels who may have been Sandinistas and a firefight occurred. The Guardia killed one rebel while the other five fled. The rebel bandit was armed with a Springfield rifle and Colt revolver. On June 6, the patrol moved toward the village of Los Cedros when it encountered an equally surprised force of Sandinistas who were on top of a brush covered hill that sloped about 175 yards down to the trail. The Sandinistas opened fire on the patrol and the patrol returned fire. Without hesitation, Puller dashed up the rise while yelling for his men to charge. Puller's men joined in the attack and fired their weapons while charging the enemy position. Puller and his Guardia were able to avoid being hit by small arms fire and crude improvised grenades thrown by the rebels. The rebels were routed and fled. Puller and his men realized they stumbled onto an insurgent camp. Seven dead rebel bodies were found and Puller's force suffered no casualties. Puller's patrol found two rifles, one pistol, and ten machetes. They also found rosters and papers in the rebel camp, which revealed that two of the seven dead rebels were leaders of the group. After that, Puller's company returned to Jinotega.

==== Further operations, June 12 – July 12, 1930 ====
Puller departed on a new patrol on June 12. Puller's patrol searched fruitlessly and found nothing. Puller and his men arrived back at their base at June 20. At June 24, Puller, William "Ironman" Lee, and their men joined forces with another government patrol of thirty men under the command of Lieutenant M.K. Chenoweth. Together the combined American-Nicaraguan force left Jinotega. At Santa Fe, Puller picked up an additional fifteen Guardias. After patrolling, Puller's men had encountered lone bandits on two occasions and killed them both. Puller's large group operated for nearly two more weeks, often split into two patrols with one following the other at a distance. The reinforced unit finally returned to base on July 12.

==== Attempted ambush against the rebels, further pursuit, and raiding a rebel camp, November 6–27, 1930 ====
Puller and his Company M went out on a patrol again on November 6, 1930. Puller, Lee, and twenty-one men left Jinotega to search for the enemy. The patrol picked up a trail of about thirty bandits who were pillaging small ranches near Santa Isabel. Puller's patrol caught sight of the enemy at 9:00 a.m. on November 19 pursuing them for three miles, and wounding at least one of them. Puller's patrol decided to surprise the bandits. The patrol set up an ambush hiding themselves along a trail when a manager of a local finca spotted them and walked up to them to provide them information on a rebel band. With the ambush compromised by the finca manager, the patrol moved on. Puller's patrol reported into Corinto Finca on November 20 for supplies and pack animals, then left on the same day to check out a report of a rebel concentration near Mt. Guapinol. Puller and his patrol struggled through heavy rains, muddy trails, and flooded rivers. On the morning of November 25, the patrol came across a bandit trail. The Guardia under Puller followed this trail and at 10:30 a.m., the point sighted about ten rebels amongst some fallen trees. Puller's men opened fire and the enemy fled. Further along the trail, the pursuers came upon the rebel camp which had four buildings with log barricades in front and a hundred-foot cliff in the rear. There were at least forty or so rebels who fought briefly. Then the rebels threw their belongings and three wounded men into the ravine and then clambered down on ropes and ladders, which they pulled down after themselves. By the time some of the Guardia worked their way down into the draw the enemy had disappeared. Puller's patrol found two dead bandits and some supplies. Puller was certain that the three wounded bandits who had gone over the cliff had died. Puller's force captured documents which showed that one of their previous operations on August 19, 1930, wounded a minor chief of the rebels. After raiding this rebel camp, Puller's unit withdrew and returned to Jinotega on November 27 after three weeks of hard patrolling.

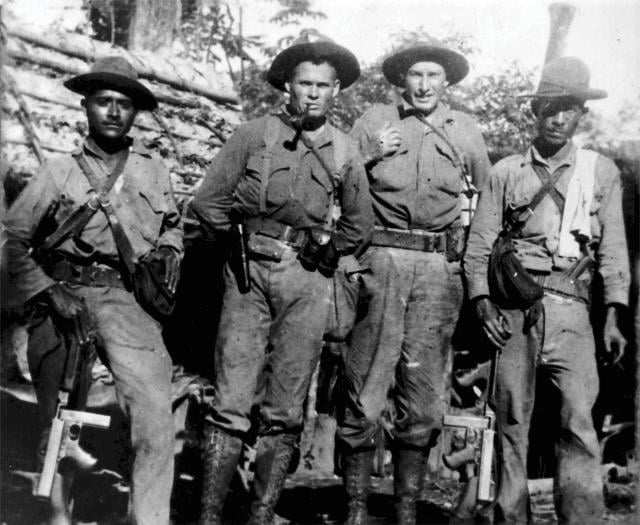
Puller (center left), Sergeant William "Ironman" Lee (center right), and two Nicaraguan soldiers in 1931

==== Patrol and raid against the rebels September 20–26, 1932 ====
Puller discovered a trail which seemed to be used by rebels. Puller, along with Lee, gathered 40 Guardia Nacional members for a raid like patrol against the rebels. Puller, Lee, and the Guardia left on September 20. After traveling a long distance, the patrol came by the northwest from the bank of Auyabal river. On September 26, Puller's patrol was ambushed by the rebels. Lee used a Lewis machine gun to keep the enemy pinned down while the Guardia Nacional worked their way up the slope opposite the rebel ambush party. When they gained the crest, they were able to fire directly into the rebel emplacements. Puller's men penetrated the center of a rebel encampment, killing at least 16 rebels. Of Puller's force, two men were killed and four wounded. In order to obtain medical care for the wounded, Puller immediately withdrew back to Jinotega. During Puller's withdrawal, his patrol was ambushed twice, but suffered no more casualties and fought off the ambushers. Puller's Guardia killed at least eight more rebels. Puller's force arrived back at Jinotega on September 30 after their raid on the rebel encampment.

==== Final battle in Nicaragua December 26, 1932 ====
There were rumors that Sandinista rebels were planning an attack on a ceremony that was going to commemorate the completion of the León–El Sauce railway. An expedition of eight American marines and 64 Nicaraguan National Guardsmen led by Puller were sent to El Sauce on the December 26, 1932. As Puller's force of American marines and Nicaraguan national guardsmen were traveling some distance in their train to their destination, they were ambushed by the rebels from both sides of the tracks. Puller and William A. Lee quickly with their troops immediately engaged the rebel ambushers. After a firefight of one hour and ten minutes, the marines and Guardia Nacional were able to drive off the rebels. Puller's victorious force had suffered three dead and three wounded for the Guardia Nacional. The rebels suffered thirty-one killed and lost 63 live horses to capture by Puller's force. The ceremony went on as planned two days later, while Puller and Lee got promoted.

=== Aftermath ===
After his service in Nicaragua, Puller was assigned to the marine detachment at the American Legation in Beijing, China, commanding a unit of China Marines. He then went on to serve aboard USS Augusta, a cruiser in the Asiatic Fleet, which was commanded by then-Captain Chester W. Nimitz. Puller returned to the States in June 1936 as an instructor at The Basic School in Philadelphia, where he trained Ben Robertshaw, Pappy Boyington, and Lew Walt.

In May 1939, he returned to the Augusta as commander of the on-board marine detachment, and then back to China, disembarking in Shanghai in May 1940 to serve as the executive officer and commanding officer of 2nd Battalion, 4th Marines (2/4) until August 1941. Major Puller returned to the U.S. on August 28, 1941. After a short leave, he was given command of 1st Battalion, 7th Marines (1/7) of the 1st Marine Division, stationed at New River, North Carolina (later Camp Lejeune).

== World War II ==
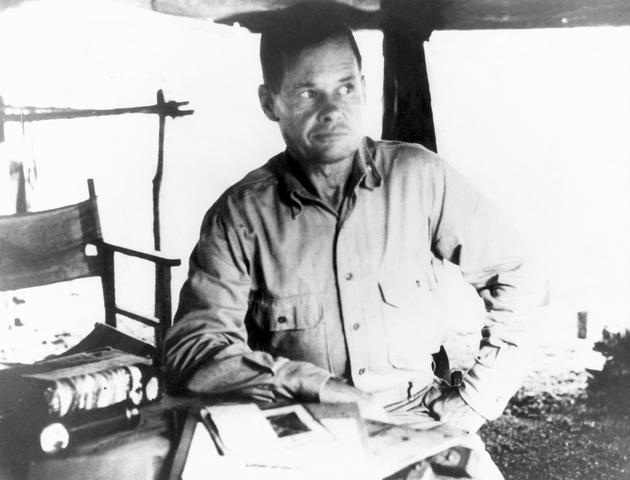
Lieutenant Colonel Puller on Guadalcanal in September 1942

Early in the Pacific theater, the 7th Marines formed the nucleus of the newly created 3rd Marine Brigade and arrived to defend American Samoa on May 8, 1942. Later they were redeployed from the brigade and on September 4, 1942, they left American Samoa and rejoined the 1st Marine Division at Guadalcanal on September 18, 1942.

Soon after arriving on Guadalcanal, Lt. Col. Puller led his battalion in a fierce action along the Matanikau, in which Puller's quick thinking saved three of his companies from annihilation. In the action, these companies were surrounded and cut off by a larger Japanese force. Puller ran to the shore, signaled a United States Navy destroyer, the USS Monssen (DD-436), and then directed the destroyer to provide fire support while landing craft rescued his marines from their precarious position. U.S. Coast Guard Signalman First Class Douglas Albert Munro—officer-in-charge of the group of landing craft, was killed while providing covering fire from his landing craft for the marines as they evacuated the beach and was posthumously awarded the Medal of Honor for the action, to date the only Coast Guardsman to receive the decoration. Puller, for his actions, was awarded the Bronze Star Medal with Combat "V".

Later on Guadalcanal, Puller was awarded his third Navy Cross, in what was later known as the "Battle for Henderson Field". Puller commanded 1st Battalion, 7th Marines (1/7), one of two American infantry units defending the airfield against a regiment-strength Japanese force. The 3rd Battalion of the U.S. Army's 164th Infantry Regiment (3/164) fought alongside the marines. In a firefight on the night of October 24–25, 1942, lasting about three hours, 1/7 and 3/164 sustained 70 casualties; the Japanese force suffered over 1,400 killed in action, and the Americans held the airfield. He nominated two of his men (one being Sgt. John Basilone) for Medals of Honor. Puller was wounded himself on November 8, 1942, during the Battle of Koli Point, suffering arm and leg wounds during a Japanese attack on his command post. His injuries were serious, requiring surgery, and command of 1/7 was temporarily assigned to Major John E. Weber of 3/7. Puller was released from the hospital and resumed command of his battalion on November 18.

Puller was then made executive officer of the 7th Marine Regiment. While serving in this capacity at the Battle of Cape Gloucester, Puller was awarded his fourth Navy Cross for overall performance of duty between December 26, 1943, and January 19, 1944. During this time, when the battalion commanders of 3rd Battalion, 7th Marines (3/7) and later, 3rd Battalion, 5th Marines (3/5), were under heavy machine gun and mortar fire, he expertly reorganized the battalion and led the successful attack against heavily fortified Japanese defensive positions. He was promoted to colonel effective February 1, 1944, and by the end of the month had been named commander of the 1st Marine Regiment. In the summer of 1944, Puller's younger brother, Samuel D. Puller, the executive officer of the 4th Marine Regiment, would be killed by an enemy sniper on Guam.

=== Battle of Peleliu ===
In September and October 1944, Puller led the 1st Marine Regiment into the protracted battle on Peleliu, one of the bloodiest battles in Marine Corps history, and received his first of two Legion of Merit awards. The 1st Marines under Puller's command lost 1,749 killed and wounded out of approximately 3,000 men, but these losses did not stop Puller from ordering frontal assaults against the well-entrenched enemy. He would come under significant criticism for not asking for reinforcements when both he and his regiment were at the point of exhaustion. During this time period Puller was described as being "almost monosyllabic" and showing little tactical deviation from frontal assaults on entrenched high ground positions When the Corps commander, General Roy Geiger visited Puller's command post, he found Puller, shirtless, with a corncob pipe in his mouth and a badly swollen leg that had originally been injured on Guadalcanal but swollen to twice its size. Colonel William Coleman, a member of the corps staff, had the impression that Puller was completely exhausted both mentally and physically. “He was unable to give a very clear picture of what his situation was.” When Geiger asked him if he needed reinforcements, Puller “stated that he was doing alright with what he had.” This was a crucial moment when Puller could have asked for the help that he so badly needed, but Puller could not bring himself ask for help from U.S. Army units held in reserve. Historian John McManus, in his highly critical article, "Fatal Pride at Peleliu", wrote, "Captain Everett Pope, one of his (Puller's) company commanders, was anything but a fan of Puller, whom he thought of as a mindless butcher. "I had no use for Puller," said Pope, who was awarded the Medal of Honor for his actions at Peleliu. "He didn't know what was going on. The adulation paid to him these days sickens me." General Robert Cushman, who would serve as Commandant of the Marine Corps, "believed that Puller was a great combat leader who nonetheless could not understand anything except constant attacks, regardless of the circumstances. 'He was beyond his element in commanding anything larger than a company—maybe a battalion—where he could keep his hands on everything and be right in the middle of it.'” McManus concluded that Puller "represented aggressiveness, valor, and inspirational leadership, all ingredients that make the Marine Corps great. But he also demonstrated the tendency of Marine Corps officers to overrely on these strengths to the exclusion of all else. His repeated, mindless frontal attacks were the American version of banzai—almost as costly, and every bit as fruitless."

As a result of the strain on both Puller and his regiment, Geiger ordered the divisional commander, William Rupertus to pull the all but annihilated 1st Marine Regiment out of the line as they were no longer combat-effective. Within days, the other two regiments would also be withdrawn from the island and replaced by three Army regiments who would also be eventually pulled out.

=== Return to the U.S. ===
Puller returned to the United States in November 1944, was named executive officer of the Infantry Training Regiment at Camp Lejeune and, two weeks later, commanding officer. After the war, he was made director of the 8th Reserve District at New Orleans, and later commanded the marine barracks at Pearl Harbor.

== Korean War ==
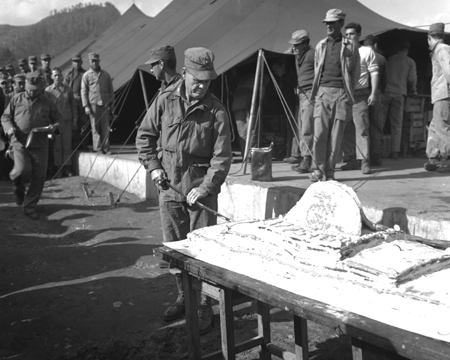
Colonel Puller cutting the Marine Corps birthday cake on November 10, 1950.

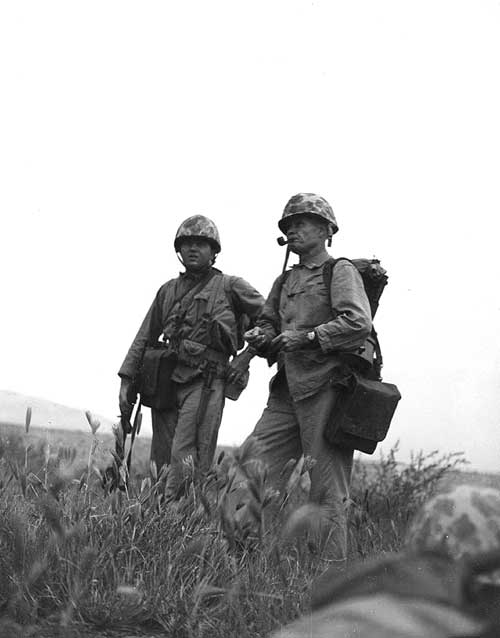
Colonel Puller studies the terrain during the Korean War.

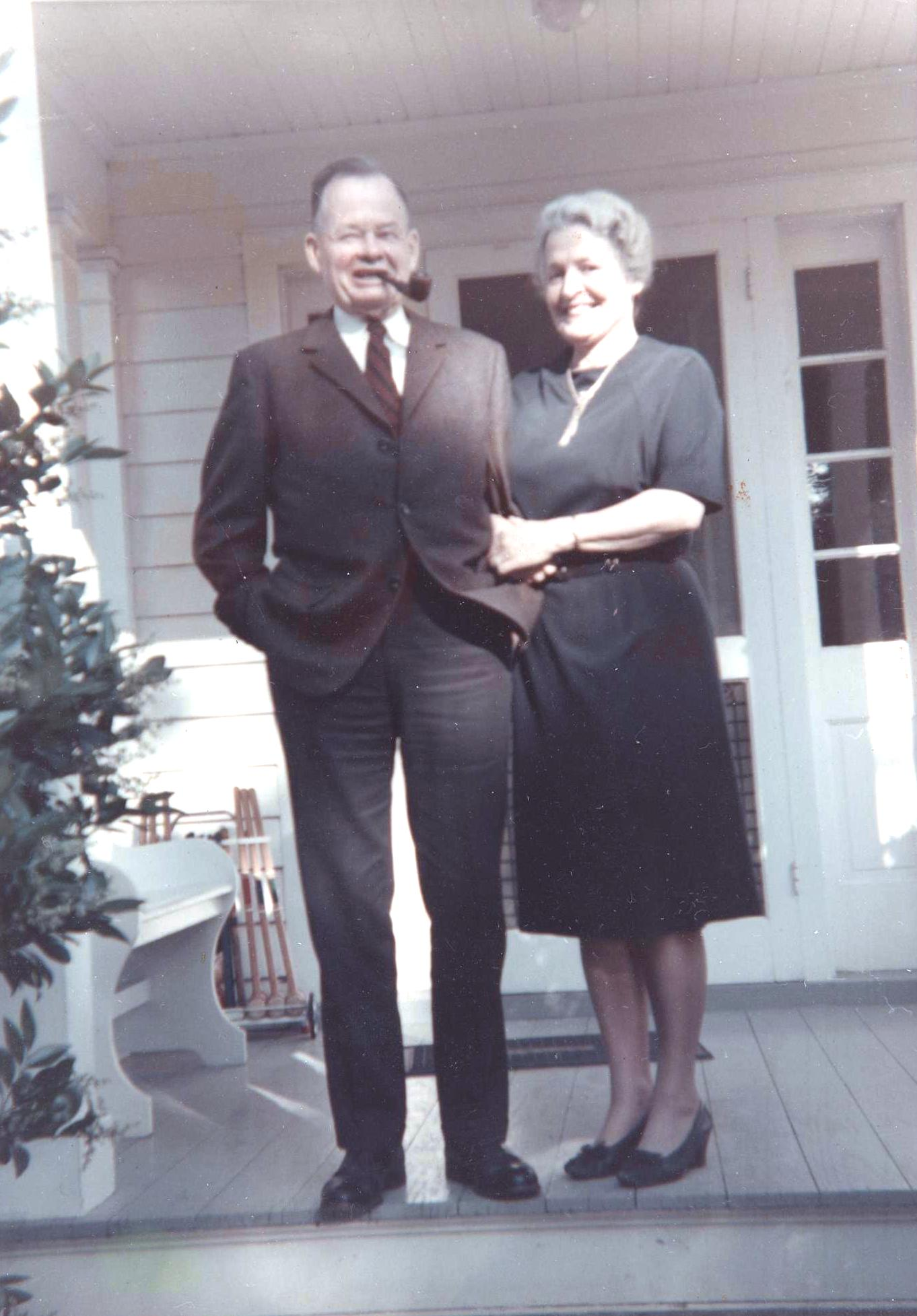
Then-retired Puller and his wife, Virginia, at their home.

At the outbreak of the Korean War, Puller was once again assigned as commander of the 1st Marine Regiment. He participated in the landing at Inchon on September 15, 1950, and was awarded the Silver Star Medal. For leadership from September 15 through November 2, he was awarded his second Legion of Merit. He was awarded the Distinguished Service Cross from the U.S. Army for heroism in action from November 29 to December 4, and his fifth Navy Cross for heroism during December 5–10, 1950, at the Battle of Chosin Reservoir. It was during that battle that he said the famous line, "We've been looking for the enemy for some time now. We've finally found him. We're surrounded. That simplifies things."

In January 1951, Puller was promoted to brigadier general and was assigned duty as assistant division commander (ADC) of the 1st Marine Division. On February 24, however, his immediate superior, Major General Oliver Prince Smith, was hastily transferred to command IX Corps when its Army commander, Major General Bryant Moore, died. Smith's transfer left Puller temporarily in command of the 1st Marine Division until sometime in March. He completed his tour of duty as assistant commander and left for the United States on May 20, 1951. He took command of the 3rd Marine Division at Camp Pendleton in California until January 1952, and then was assistant commander of the division until June 1952. He then took over Troop Training Unit Pacific at Coronado, California. In September 1953, he was promoted to major general.

== Post-Korean War life ==
In July 1954, Puller took command of the 2nd Marine Division at Camp Lejeune in North Carolina until February 1955 when he became Deputy Camp Commander. He suffered a stroke, and was retired by the Marine Corps on November 1, 1955, with a promotion to lieutenant general.

His nickname was related to the way his barrel chest stood out due to his aggressive stance, with legends claiming that a steel plate had been inserted by surgeons to treat a battle wound. In a handwritten addition to a typed November 22, 1954, letter to Major Frank C. Sheppard, Puller wrote, "I agree with you 100%. I had done a little soldiering previous to Guadalcanal and had been called a lot of names, but why 'Chesty'? Especially the steel part??"

== Family and personal life ==
Puller's son, Lewis Burwell Puller, Jr. (generally known as Lewis Puller), served as a Marine 1st lieutenant in the Vietnam War. While serving with 2nd Battalion, 1st Marines (2/1), Lewis Jr. was severely wounded by a mine explosion, losing both legs and parts of his hands. Lieutenant General Puller broke down sobbing at seeing his son for the first time in the hospital. Lewis Jr. won a 1992 Pulitzer Prize for his autobiography, Fortunate Son: The Healing of a Vietnam Vet. He committed suicide in 1994.

Puller was father-in-law to Colonel William H. Dabney, a Virginia Military Institute (VMI) graduate, who was the commanding officer (then Captain) of two heavily reinforced rifle companies of the 3rd Battalion, 26th Marines (3/26) from January 21 to April 14, 1968, in Vietnam. During the entire period, Dabney's force stubbornly defended Hill 881 South, a regional outpost vital to the defense of the Khe Sanh Combat Base during the 77-day siege at the Battle of Khe Sanh. Dabney was recommended for the Navy Cross for his actions on Hill 881 South, but his battalion executive officer's helicopter carrying the recommendation papers crashed and the papers were lost. It was not until April 15, 2005, that Colonel Dabney received the Navy Cross during an award ceremony at Virginia Military Institute.

Puller was a distant cousin to U.S. Army General George S. Patton.

He was an Episcopalian and parishioner of Christ Church Parish in Saluda and is buried in the historic cemetery there next to his wife, Virginia Montague Evans.

== Decorations and awards ==
Puller received the second-highest U.S. military award six times (one of only two persons so honored): five Navy Crosses and one U.S. Army Distinguished Service Cross. He was the second of two U.S. servicemen (after U.S. Navy submarine commander Roy Milton Davenport) to ever receive five Navy Crosses.

Puller's military awards include:

1st row	Navy Cross with 4 Gold Stars		Distinguished Service Cross (Army)	Silver Star (Army)
2nd row	Legion of Merit with Combat "V" and 1 Gold Star	Bronze Star Medal with Combat "V"	Air Medal with 2 Gold stars	Purple Heart
3rd row	Presidential Unit Citation with 4 bronze stars	Marine Corps Good Conduct Medal with 1 bronze star	Marine Corps Expeditionary Medal with 1 bronze star	World War I Victory Medal with West Indies clasp
4th row	Haitian Campaign Medal	Second Nicaraguan Campaign Medal	China Service Medal	American Defense Service Medal with 1 bronze star
5th row	American Campaign Medal	Asiatic-Pacific Campaign Medal with 4 bronze stars	World War II Victory Medal	National Defense Service Medal
6th row	Korean Service Medal with 1 silver star	Haitian; Médaille militaire	Nicaraguan Presidential Medal of Merit with Diploma (gold star)	Nicaraguan Cross of Valor with Diploma
7th row	Korean Order of Military Merit, Eulji Cordon Medal	Republic of China Order of the Cloud and Banner with Special Cravat	Republic of Korea; Presidential Unit Citation	United Nations Service Medal for Korea

=== First Navy Cross citation ===
Citation:

For distinguished service in the line of his profession while commanding a Nicaraguan National Guard patrol. First Lieutenant Lewis B. Puller, United States Marine Corps, successfully led his forces into five successful engagements against superior numbers of armed bandit forces; namely, at LaVirgen on 16 February 1930, at Los Cedros on 6 June 1930, at Moncotal on 22 July 1930, at Guapinol on 25 July 1930, and at Malacate on 19 August 1930, with the result that the bandits were in each engagement completely routed with losses of nine killed and many wounded. By his intelligent and forceful leadership without thought of his own personal safety, by great physical exertion and by suffering many hardships, Lieutenant Puller surmounted all obstacles and dealt five successive and severe blows against organized banditry in the Republic of Nicaragua.

=== Second Navy Cross citation ===
Citation:

First Lieutenant Lewis B. Puller, United States Marine Corps (Captain, Guardia Nacional de Nicaragua) performed exceptionally meritorious service in a duty of great responsibility while in command of a Guardia Patrol from 20 September to 1 October 1932. Lieutenant Puller and his command of forty Guardia and Gunnery Sergeant William A. Lee, United States Marine Corps, serving as a First Lieutenant in the Guardia, penetrated the isolated mountainous bandit territory for a distance of from eighty to one hundred miles north of Jinotega, his nearest base. This patrol was ambushed on 26 September 1932, at a point northeast of Mount Kilambe by an insurgent force of one hundred fifty in a well-prepared position armed with not less than seven automatic weapons and various classes of small arms and well-supplied with ammunition. Early in the combat, Gunnery Sergeant Lee, the Second in Command, was seriously wounded and reported as dead. The Guardia immediately behind Lieutenant Puller in the point was killed by the first burst of fire, Lieutenant Puller, with great courage, coolness and display of military judgment, so directed the fire and movement of his men that the enemy were driven first from the high ground on the right of his position, and then by a flanking movement forced from the high ground to the left and finally were scattered in confusion with a loss of ten killed and many wounded by the persistent and well-directed attack of the patrol. The numerous casualties suffered by the enemy and the Guardia losses of two killed and four wounded are indicative of the severity of the enemy resistance. This signal victory in jungle country, with no lines of communication and a hundred miles from any supporting force, was largely due to the indomitable courage and persistence of the patrol commander. Returning with the wounded to Jinotega, the patrol was ambushed twice by superior forces on 30 September. On both of the occasions the enemy was dispersed with severe losses.

=== Third Navy Cross citation ===
Citation:

For extraordinary heroism as Commanding Officer of the First Battalion, Seventh Marines, First Marine Division, during the action against enemy Japanese forces on Guadalcanal, Solomon Islands, on the night of 24 to 25 October 1942. While Lieutenant Colonel Puller's battalion was holding a mile-long front in a heavy downpour of rain, a Japanese force, superior in number, launched a vigorous assault against that position of the line which passed through a dense jungle. Courageously withstanding the enemy's desperate and determined attacks, Lieutenant Colonel Puller not only held his battalion to its position until reinforcements arrived three hours later, but also effectively commanded the augmented force until late in the afternoon of the next day. By his tireless devotion to duty and cool judgment under fire, he prevented a hostile penetration of our lines and was largely responsible for the successful defense of the sector assigned to his troops.

=== Fourth Navy Cross citation ===
Citation:

For extraordinary heroism as Executive Officer of the Seventh Marines, First Marine Division, serving with the Sixth United States Army, in combat against enemy Japanese forces at Cape Gloucester, New Britain, from 26 December 1943 to 19 January 1944. Assigned temporary command of the Third Battalion, Seventh Marines, from 4 to 9 January, Lieutenant Colonel Puller quickly reorganized and advanced his unit, effecting the seizure of the objective without delay. Assuming additional duty in command of the Third Battalion, Fifth Marines, from 7 to 8 January, after the commanding officer and executive officer had been wounded, Lieutenant Colonel Puller unhesitatingly exposed himself to rifle, machine-gun and mortar fire from strongly entrenched Japanese positions to move from company to company in his front lines, reorganizing and maintaining a critical position along a fire-swept ridge. His forceful leadership and gallant fighting spirit under the most hazardous conditions were contributing factors in the defeat of the enemy during this campaign and in keeping with the highest traditions of the United States Naval Service.

=== Fifth Navy Cross citation ===
Citation

For extraordinary heroism as Commanding Officer of the First Marines, First Marine Division (Reinforced), in action against aggressor forces in the vicinity of Koto-ri, Korea, from 5 to 10 December 1950. Fighting continuously in sub-zero weather against a vastly outnumbering hostile force, Colonel Puller drove off repeated and fanatical enemy attacks upon his Regimental defense sector and supply points. Although the area was frequently covered by grazing machine-gun fire and intense artillery and mortar fire, he coolly moved along his troops to insure their correct tactical employment, reinforced the lines as the situation demanded, and successfully defended the perimeter, keeping open the main supply routes for the movement of the Division. During the attack from Koto-ri to Hungnam, he expertly utilized his Regiment as the Division rear guard, repelling two fierce enemy assaults which severely threatened the security of the unit, and personally supervised the care and prompt evacuation of all casualties. By his unflagging determination, he served to inspire his men to heroic efforts in defense of their positions and assured the safety of much valuable equipment which would otherwise have been lost to the enemy. His skilled leadership, superb courage and valiant devotion to duty in the face of overwhelming odds reflect the highest credit upon Colonel Puller and the United States Naval Service.

=== Distinguished Service Cross citation ===
Citation:

The President of the United States of America, under the provisions of the Act of Congress approved July 9, 1918, takes pleasure in presenting the Distinguished Service Cross to Colonel Lewis B. "Chesty" Puller (MCSN: 0-3158), United States Marine Corps, for extraordinary heroism in connection with military operations against an armed enemy of the United Nations while serving as Commanding Officer, First Marines, FIRST Marine Division (Reinforced), in action against enemy aggressor forces in the vicinity of the Chosin Reservoir, Korea, during the period 29 November to 4 December 1950. Colonel Puller's actions contributed materially to the breakthrough of the First Marine Regiment in the Chosin Reservoir area and are in keeping with the highest traditions of the military service.

=== Silver Star citation ===
Citation:

The President of the United States of America, authorized by Act of Congress July 9, 1918, takes pleasure in presenting the Silver Star (Army Award) to Colonel Lewis B. "Chesty" Puller (MCSN: 0-3158), United States Marine Corps, for conspicuous gallantry and intrepidity while Commanding the First Marines, FIRST Marine Division (Reinforced), in action against enemy aggressor forces during the amphibious landing resulting in the capture of Inchon, Korea, on 15 September 1950 in the Inchon-Seoul Operation. His actions contributed materially to the success of this operation and were in keeping with the highest traditions of the Military Service.

== Namesakes and honors ==
In addition to his military awards Puller has received numerous honors due to his Marine Corps service:

- On October 26, 2017, a groundbreaking ceremony was held for the Puller Veterans Care Center located in Vint Hill, Fauquier County, Virginia. The facility was named in honor of Puller and his wife.
- The frigate Lewis B. Puller (FFG-23) was named after him.
- The headquarters building for 2nd Fleet Antiterrorism Security Team on Yorktown Naval Weapons Station in Yorktown, Virginia, is named Puller Hall in his honor.
- Route 33 in Middlesex County, Virginia, is named General Puller Highway. It is the county in which Puller is buried.
- On November 10, 2005, the United States Postal Service issued its Distinguished Marines stamps in which Puller was honored.
- The current Marine Corps' mascot has been named "Chesty Pullerton" (e.g. Chesty XIII). He is always a purebred English Bulldog.
- In 2012, Military Sealift Command announced that a Mobile Landing Platform will be named after Puller, USNS Lewis B. Puller (T-MLP-3/T-AFSB-1).

== Death and legacy ==
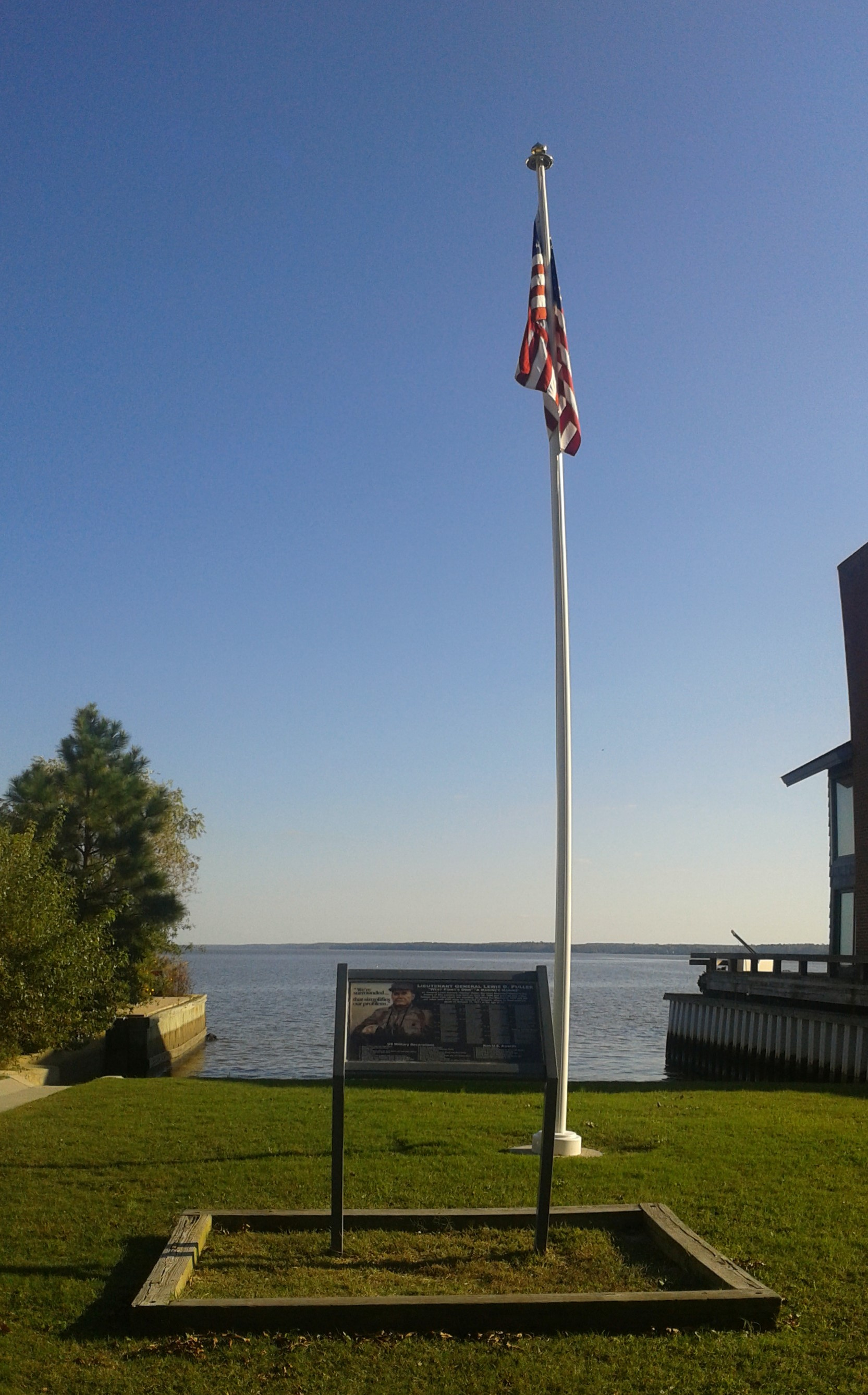
A memorial flagpole erected in Puller's honor in his hometown of West Point

Following his retirement Puller lived in Saluda, Virginia, where he was later buried after his death on October 11, 1971, at Christ Church Cemetery next to his wife.

Puller remains a well-known figure in U.S. Marine Corps folklore with tales of his experiences being constantly recounted among U.S. Marines.

A common practice in U.S. Marine Corps boot camp is to end one's day with the declaration, "Good night, Chesty, wherever you are!" Another common encouragement is "Chesty Puller never quit!"

In U.S. Marine Corps recruit training and OCS cadences, Marines chant "It was good for Chesty Puller / And it's good enough for me" as well as "Tell Chesty Puller I did my best."—Chesty is symbolic of the esprit de corps of the marines. Also, the recruits sing "Chesty Puller was a good Marine and a good Marine was he."

U.S. Marines, while doing pull-ups, will tell each other to "do one for Chesty!"

Puller insisted upon good equipment and discipline; once he came upon a second lieutenant who had ordered an enlisted man to salute him 100 times for missing a salute. Puller told the lieutenant, "You were absolutely correct in making him salute you 100 times, Lieutenant, but you know that an officer must return every salute he receives. Now return them all and I will keep count."

While on duty in Hawaii and inspecting the armory, Puller fined himself $100 for accidentally discharging a .45 caliber pistol indoors, although the charge for his men was only $20.

A section of Virginia Highway 33 running from West Point thru Saluda to the Middlesex County community of Deltaville is named Lewis B Puller Memorial Highway; it terminates at the Chesapeake Bay shoreline

Puller was also a life-long freemason. He was made a master mason at Hiram Lodge Number 57 in Virginia, where he was a member until his death.

== In popular culture ==
- The book Marine!: The Life of Chesty Puller, ISBN 978-0553271829, is about his life as a Marine.
- The book Chesty Puller's Rules of Success, ISBN 978-1885541079, written by Bill Davis, Col, USMC (ret) explores 20 of Puller's "self-imposed principles of action" he gleaned from numerous meetings with the legendary General.
- The biography Chesty: The Story of Lieutenant General Lewis B. Puller, USMC, ISBN 978-0375760440, by Col. Jon T. Hoffman, USMCR, won the Marine Corps Heritage Foundation's 2001 General Wallace M. Greene Award: Best Marine Corps History Book of the Year.
- John Ford directed Chesty: A Tribute to a Legend a 1976 film documentary.
- In the HBO miniseries The Pacific (2010), Puller is played by the American actor William Sadler.

== See also ==
- List of historically notable United States Marines

== Bibliography ==
- Boot, Max (2002). The Savage Wars of Peace – Small Wars and the Rise of American Power. Basic Books. ISBN 0-465-00721-X. LCCN 2004695066.
- Crocker, H.W. (2006). Don't Tread on me: A 400-year history of America at War, from Indian Fighting to Terrorist Hunting. Crown Forum. ISBN 1-4000-5363-3.
- Davis, Burke (1991) [1962]. Marine! The Life of Chesty Puller. Bantam Books. ISBN 0-553-27182-2. Archived from the original on October 25, 2021.
- Fehrenbach, T.R. (1963). This Kind of War. Dulles, Virginia: Brassey's. ISBN 1-57488-259-7.
- Hoffman, Jon T. (2001). Chesty: The Story of Lieutenant General Lewis B. Puller, USMC. Random House. ISBN 0-679-44732-6.
- Russ, Martin (1999). Breakout – The Chosin Reservoir Campaign, Korea, 1950. Penguin Books. ISBN 0-14-029259-4.
- Simmons, Edwin H. (2003). The United States Marines: A History, Fourth Edition. Annapolis, Maryland: Naval Institute Press. ISBN 1-59114-790-5.
- "Lieutenant General Lewis "Chesty" B. Puller, USMC". Who's Who in Marine Corps History. History Division, United States Marine Corps. Archived from the original on January 22, 2015.
- "Lieutenant General Lewis "Chesty" Puller – Deceased". General Officer biographies. United States Marine Corps. Archived from the original on January 18, 2012.
