= Quantico National Cemetery =

Veterans cemetery in Prince William County, Virginia

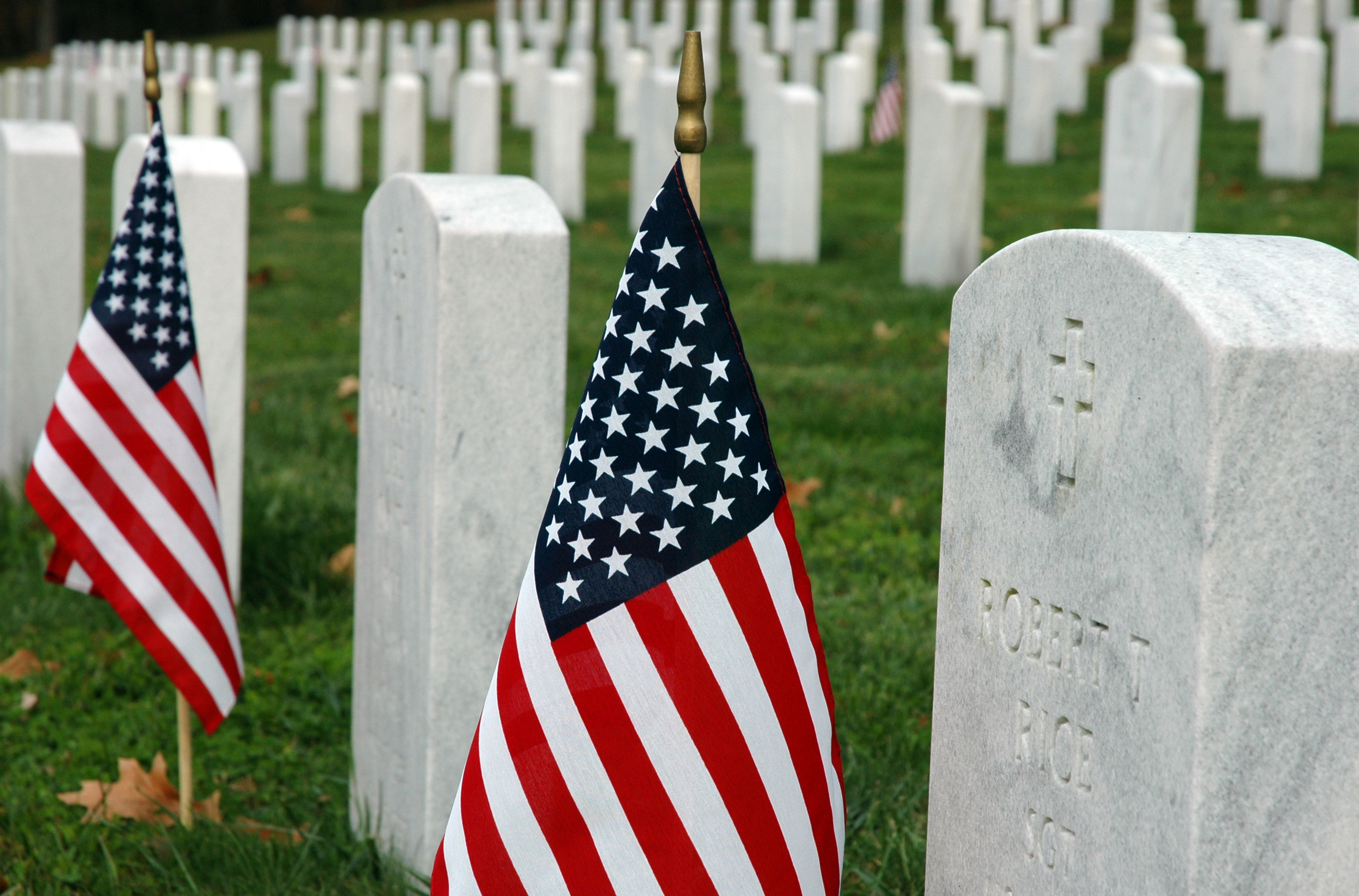
- Interactive map of Quantico National Cemetery

Details
- Established: 1983
- Location: Quantico, Virginia
- Country: United States
- Coordinates: 38°32′47″N 77°21′46″W
- Type: United States National Cemetery
- Size: 725 acres (293 ha)
- No. of interments: >40,000
- Website: Official
- Find a Grave: Quantico National Cemetery

Quantico National Cemetery, officially the National Memorial Cemetery at Quantico, is a national cemetery in Triangle, Virginia for veterans who served in the United States Armed Forces. Adjacent to and originally part of Marine Corps Base Quantico, it was established as a national cemetery in 1983 with an area of 725 acres (293 ha).

== Location ==
Quantico National Cemetery is located on land that was part of the U.S. Marine Corps training base adjacent to Quantico in Prince William County, Virginia. The land has been used by the military for over 200 years. First, around 1775 by the Commonwealth of Virginia for Navy operations, and later, as a blockade point for the Confederate Army during the Civil War.

In 1918 a permanent Marine base was established at Quantico. The Marine Corps Schools, a forerunner of the Marine Corps Development and Education Command, was created there in 1921. Since 1941, the focus of the base has been individual education rather than unit training. In 1977, the Marine Corps donated 725 acres (2.9 km²) of this land to the U.S. Department of Veterans Affairs National Cemetery Administration, to establish a facility at Quantico. The cemetery was formally dedicated on May 15, 1983.

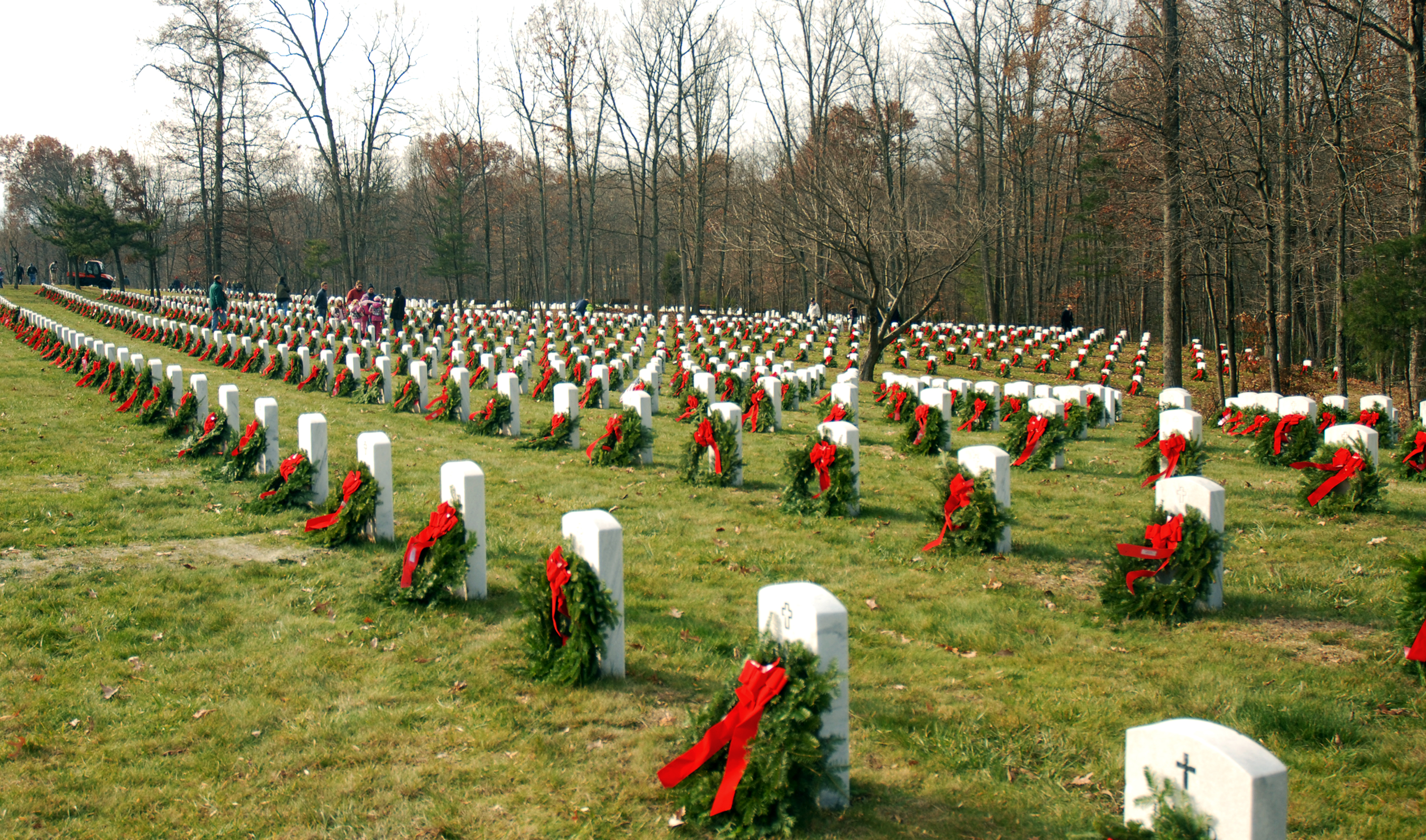
Volunteers with the Sgt. Mac Foundation placed wreaths on 2,200 graves at Quantico National Cemetery on December 6, 2008 to honor interred service members

== Controversy ==
In October 1983, the public became aware that interments in National Cemeteries, and specifically in Quantico National Cemetery, were not all in keeping with the dignity and respect merited by veterans and their families. It was reported that "some veterans were being buried naked or wrapped in sheets, in plastic bags, and in cardboard boxes." As a result, the Commonwealth of Virginia passed a resolution to the United States House of Representatives to ensure the United States Veterans Administration take appropriate action to ensure veterans at all National Cemeteries be treated with the dignity, respect and gratitude they earned for their service to the United States.

== Monuments and memorials ==
There are seven memorials in all. A monument to Edson’s Raiders was the first memorial dedicated at Quantico National Cemetery, unveiled on the memorial pathway on August 6, 1989. It is dedicated to the 800 members of the First Marine Raider Battalion, which from August 1942 to October 1943, played a key role in helping the greatly outnumbered American forces push back Japanese troops in the British Solomon Islands.

The Purple Heart Memorial was dedicated August 7, 1990, in honor of Purple Heart medal recipients interred at the cemetery. The Purple Heart was created by General George Washington in 1782 and was originally awarded for heroism. It eventually fell into disuse until 1931 when Gen. Douglas MacArthur revived it for soldiers who were wounded or killed in defense of their nation.

Additional memorials honor: the Fourth Marine or “Fighting Fourth” Division; the Commonwealth of Virginia Memorial dedicated to honor all of the nation’s veterans; the First Marine Division Memorial; and the 6th Marine Division or “Striking Sixth” Memorial to honor the division that won the Presidential Unit Citation for its actions in the Battle of Okinawa during World War II; the memorial design is based on an Okinawan tomb.

== Notable burials ==
- Captain Frederick C. Branch (1922–2005), first African–American officer of the Marine Corps.
- Hector A. Cafferata Jr. (1929–2016), recipient of the Medal of Honor for actions at the Battle of Chosin Reservoir during the Korean War.
- John Cephas (1930–2009), blues guitarist and singer, served with the US Army in the Korean War.
- Charles Colson (1931–2012), Watergate figure and later Evangelical Christian leader; served as a USMC Captain in the Korean War.
- Herbert Harris (1926–2014), US Representative from Virginia; served as a US Navy officer during World War II.
- Colonel William "Rich" Higgins (1945–1990), was captured by a pro-Iranian Shiite Muslim group in February 1988 in Beirut while serving as chief of a UN observer group. His kidnappers killed him in July 1990. A cenotaph was erected until his body was repatriated in 1991.
- Chuck Hinton (1934–2013), Major League Baseball player; served in the US Army.
- Colonel William A. Lee (1900–1998), recipient of three Navy Crosses for actions during the occupation of Nicaragua.
- Louis R. Lowery (1916–1987), a World War II Marine combat photographer, took the picture of the first U.S. flag rising on top of Iwo Jima's Mount Suribachi in 1945.
- Matthew G. Martínez (1929–2011), US Representative; served with the US Marine Corps.
- Samuel R. Shaw (1911–1989), Brigadier general in the Marine Corps and advisor to President John F. Kennedy in the 1962 Cuban Missile Crisis.
- Eugene M. Stoner (1922–1997), engineer and firearm designer who developed the AR-15; served as a USMC Corporal in World War II.
- Leon Uris (1924–2003), novelist and USMC PFC in World War II. His novel Battle Cry was based on his experiences.
- General Lewis W. Walt (1913–1989), Assistant Commandant of the Marine Corps from 1968–1971; interred with his wife Nancy (1917–2000), an Army Nurse during World War II.
