= USS Lewis B. Puller (FFG-23) =

Oliver Hazard Perry-class frigate

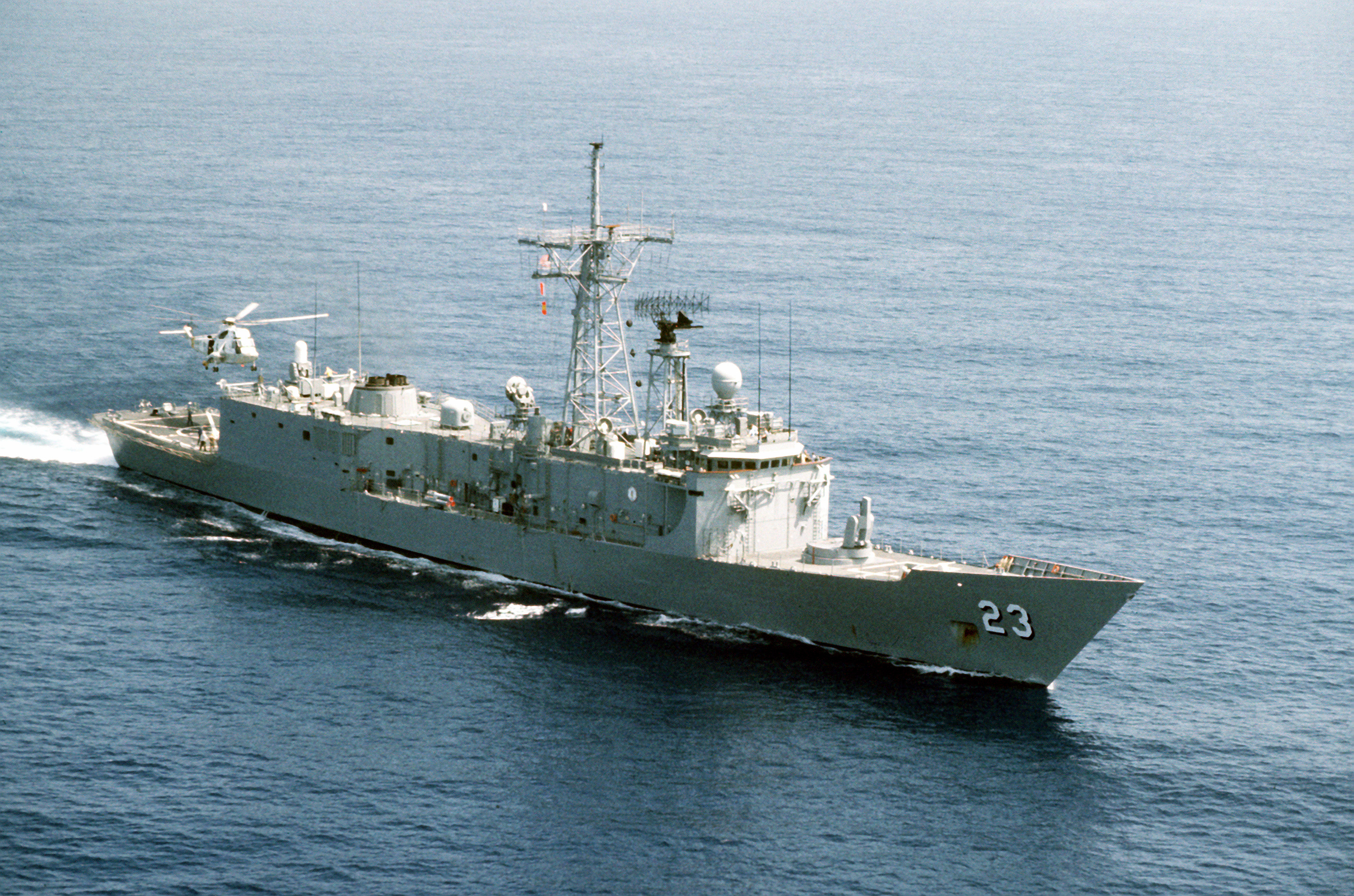
- USS Lewis B Puller in 1983

History

United States
- Name: Lewis B. Puller
- Namesake: Lieutenant General Lewis B. Puller
- Ordered: 28 February 1977
- Builder: Todd Pacific Shipyards, Los Angeles Division, San Pedro, California
- Laid down: 23 May 1979
- Launched: 15 March 1980
- Sponsored by: Mrs. Lewis B. Puller, widow of Lieutenant General Puller
- Acquired: 1 March 1982
- Commissioned: 17 April 1982
- Decommissioned: 18 September 1998
- Stricken: 18 September 1998
- Home port: San Diego, California (former)
- Identification: Hull symbol:FFG-23; Code letters:NLBP
- Motto: "Esprit – Discipline – Service"
- Fate: transferred to Egyptian Navy, 18 September 1998
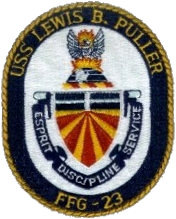
- Badge

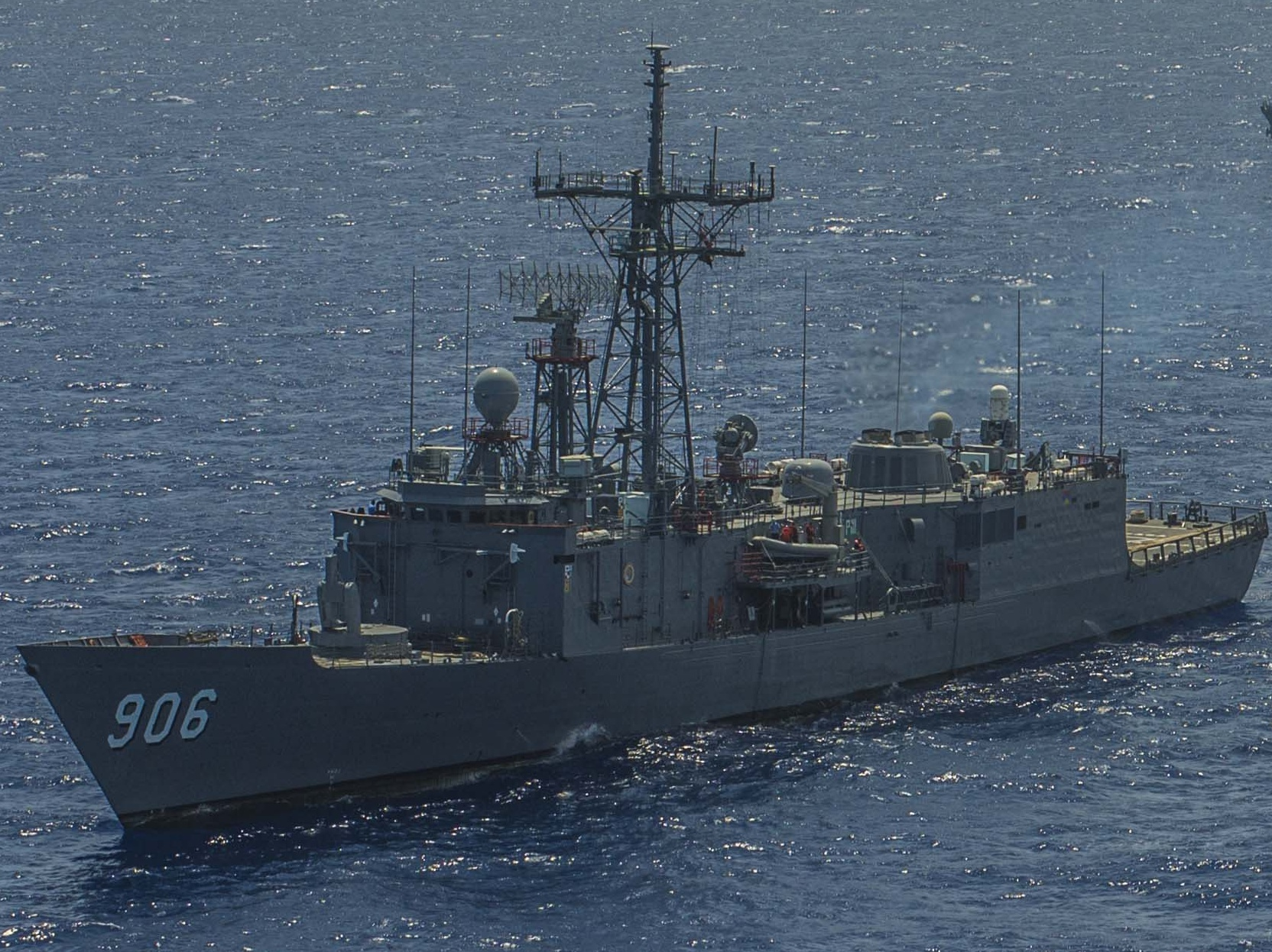
- ENS Toushka in May 2013

Egypt
- Name: Toushka
- Namesake: Area near Toshka Lakes
- Acquired: 18 September 1996
- Commissioned: December 1998
- Identification: F906
- Status: in active service

General characteristics
- Class & type: Oliver Hazard Perry-class frigate
- Displacement: 4,100 long tons (4,200 t), full load
- Length: 445 feet (136 m), overall
- Beam: 45 feet (14 m)
- Draft: 22 feet (6.7 m)
- Propulsion: 2 × General Electric LM2500-30 gas turbines generating 41,000 shp (31 MW) through a single shaft and variable pitch propeller; 2 × Auxiliary Propulsion Units, 350 hp (260 kW) retractable electric azimuth thrusters for maneuvering and docking.
- Speed: over 29 knots (54 km/h)
- Range: 5,000 nautical miles at 18 knots (9,300 km at 33 km/h)
- Complement: 15 officers and 190 enlisted, plus SH-60 LAMPS detachment of roughly six officer pilots and 15 enlisted maintainers
- Sensors & processing systems: AN/SPS-49 air-search radar; AN/SPS-55 surface-search radar; CAS and STIR fire-control radar; AN/SQS-56 sonar.
- Electronic warfare & decoys: AN/SLQ-32
- Armament: As built: 1 × OTO Melara Mk 75 76 mm/62 caliber naval gun; 2 × Mk 32 triple-tube (324 mm) launchers for Mark 46 torpedoes; 1 × Vulcan Phalanx CIWS; 4 × .50-cal (12.7 mm) machine guns.; 1 × Mk 13 Mod 4 single-arm launcher for Harpoon anti-ship missiles and SM-1MR Standard anti-ship/air missiles (40 round magazine); Note: As of 2004, Mk 13 systems removed from all active US vessels of this class.
- Aircraft carried: 1 × SH-2F LAMPS I

USS Lewis B. Puller (FFG-23) was the fifteenth ship of the Oliver Hazard Perry class of guided-missile frigates in the United States Navy. She was the first US Navy ship to be named for United States Marine Corps Lieutenant General Lewis B. "Chesty" Puller (1898–1971). Ordered from Todd Pacific Shipyards, Los Angeles Division, San Pedro, California on 28 February 1977 as part of the FY77 program, Lewis B. Puller was laid down on 23 May 1979, launched on 15 March 1980, and commissioned on 17 April 1982. Decommissioned and stricken on 18 September 1998, she was transferred to Egypt the same day as Toushka (F906).
