= Ward Hill, Massachusetts =

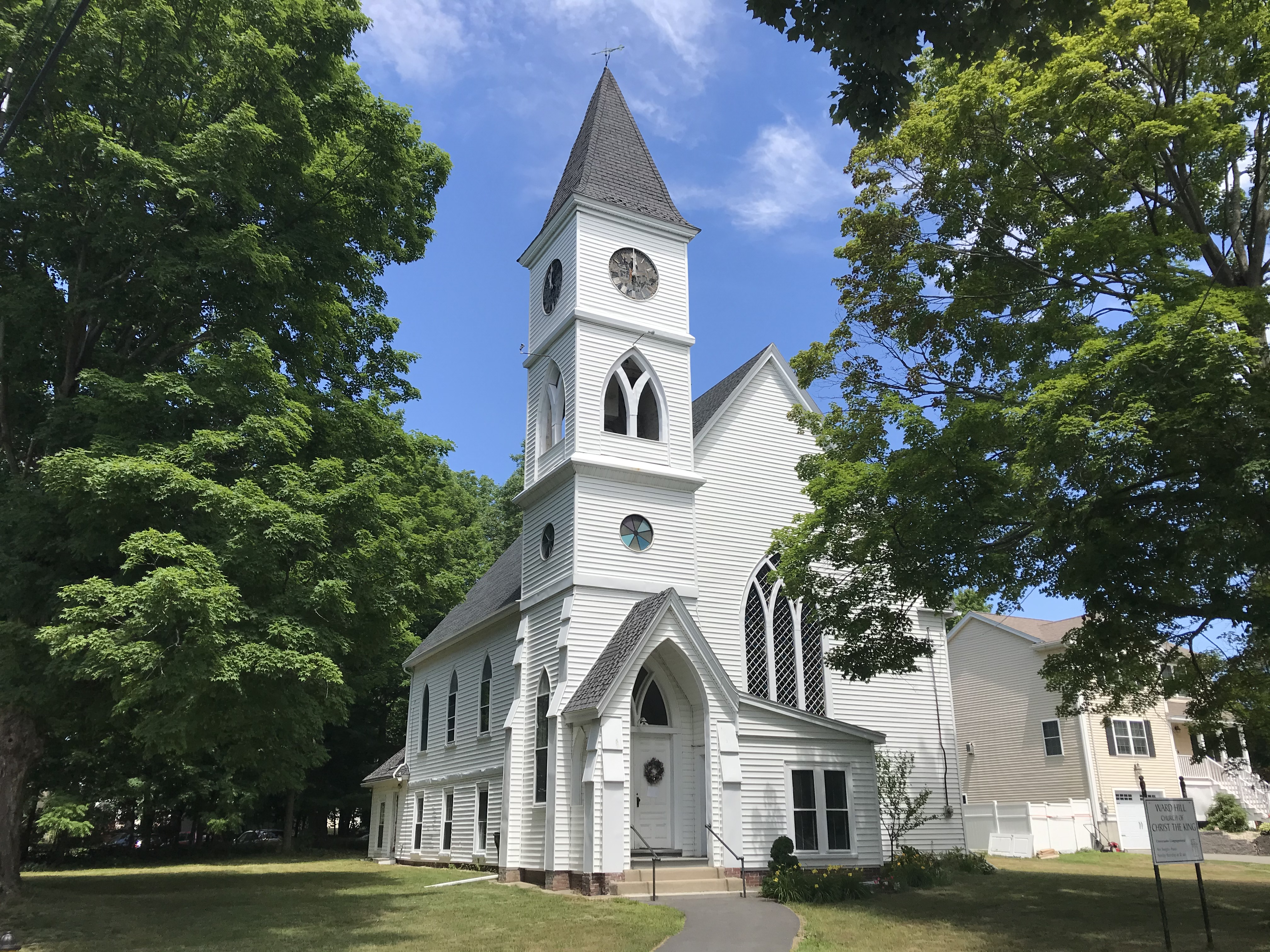
Ward Hill Church of Christ the King

Ward Hill is a neighborhood in Haverhill, Essex County, Massachusetts. Its coordinates are at 42°45′N 71°06′W. It is bordered on the northeast and west by the Merrimack River. Main roads include the Massachusetts Route 125 called South Main Street where it passes through, the Connector road to I-495 exit 48 and I-495 where it is called the Blue Star Memorial Highway.

It also has a hill called Ward Hill and an island called Kimball Island on the river bank on the west.

Other places in this neighborhood include the Whittier Rehabilitation Hospital.
