= Battle of Achuapa =

- Part of United States occupation of Nicaragua, Banana Wars
- Battle of Achuapa (Nicaragua)
Date	31 December 1930
Location	near Achuapa, Nicaragua
Result	Sandinistan victory

Belligerents
United States	Sandinistas

Commanders and leaders
(United States) Sgt. Arthur M. Palrang †	Miguel Angel Ortez

Strength
10 marines	Unknown

Casualties and losses
8 killed 2 wounded 8 mules captured	11 killed 4 wounded (estimate)

The Battle of Achuapa, or the Achuapa massacre, took place on December 31, 1930 during the American occupation of Nicaragua of 1926–1933.

The engagement took place when a ten-man unit of American Marines led by Sergeant Arthur M. Palrang were ambushed by Sandinista forces led by Miguel Angel Ortez after leaving Ocotal to repair the telephone line with San Fernando.

Eight Marines were killed in the firefight (including Palrang), with the two survivors being wounded. It was the largest loss of American life in a single battle during the occupation of Nicaragua.

The battle resulted in the Sandinistas capturing "two Browning automatic rifles, one Thompson submachine gun, three Springfield rifles, and eight fully equipped mules." The battle lasted two and a half hours.

In the United States, the incident reignited controversy over the military occupation of Nicaragua. On 2 January 1931, Senator William E. Borah, the Chairman of the Senate Foreign Relations Committee, called for a withdrawal of American military personnel from Nicaragua.

== American casualties ==
Killed:

- Sergeant Arthur M. Palrang
- Corporal Irving T. Aron
- Private Lambert Bush
- Private Edward E. Elliott
- Private Joseph A. Harbaugh
- Private Frank Kosieradzki
- Private Richard J. Litz
- Private Joseph A. McCarty

Wounded:

- Private Mack Hutcherson
- Private Frank A. Jackson
