= Infantry weapons officer =

United States Marine Corps warrant officer speciality

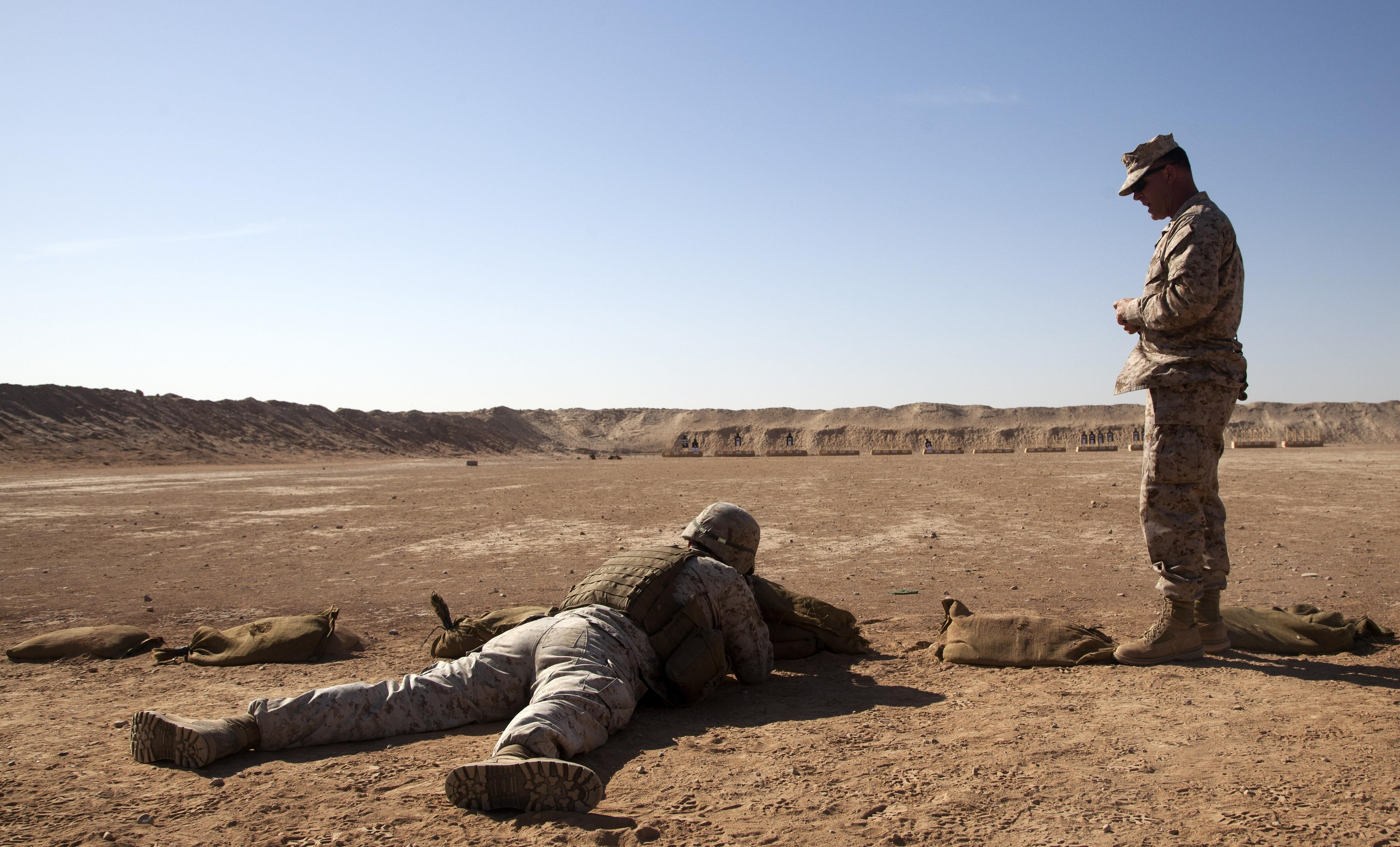
CWO-4 Matthew Carpenter, a Marine Corps infantry weapons officer, coaches a marine during weapons marksmanship training at Camp Leatherneck, Helmand Province, Afghanistan c. October 2012

U.S. Marine Corps Gunner insignia
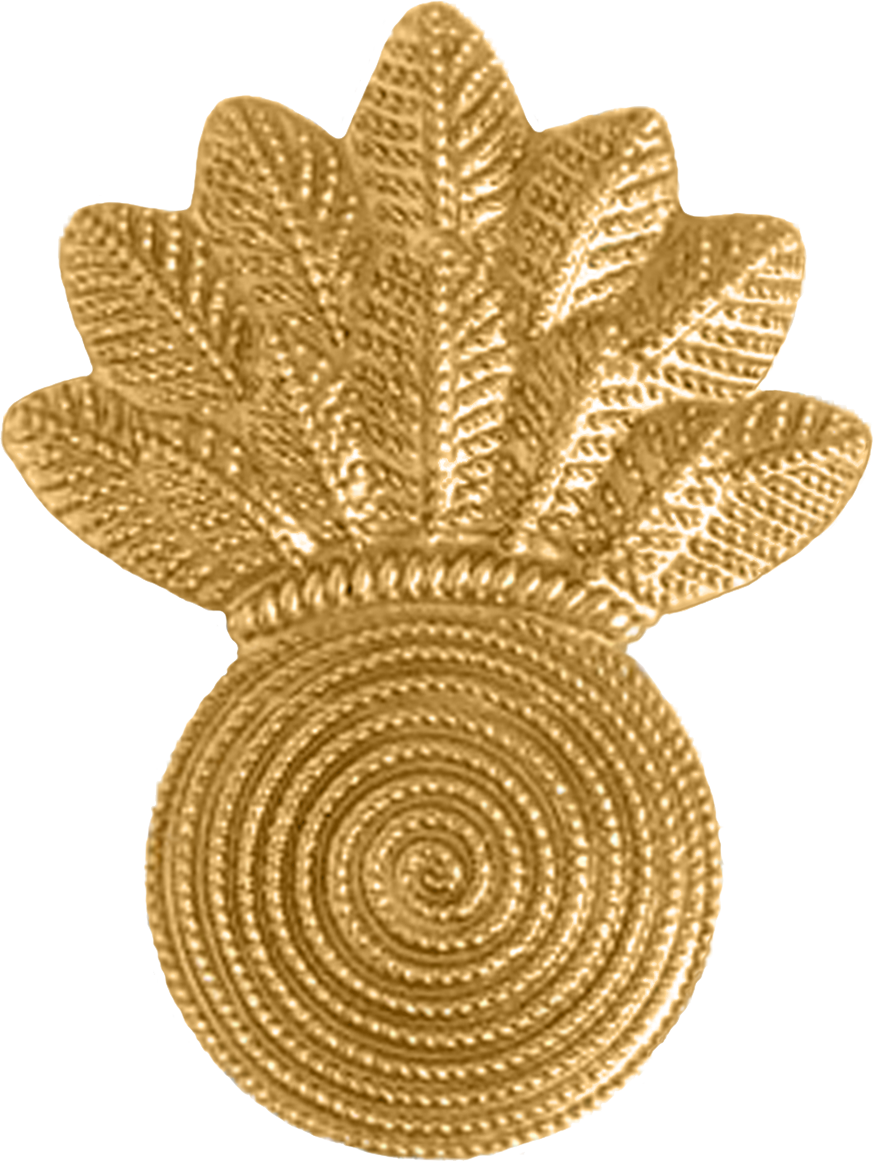
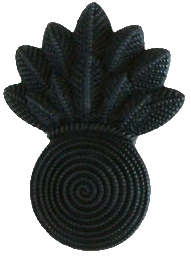

The United States Marine Corps MOS 0306, infantry weapons officers, commonly referred to as "the Gunner" or "Marine gunner" are non-technical chief warrant officers (CWO-2 to CWO-5) that are weapons specialists and are knowledgeable in the tactical employment of all the infantry weapons in the Marine Corps arsenal—all weapons organic to Marine infantry units.

== Overview ==
The requirements to apply for selection are very stringent and much higher than what is needed for other warrant officer appointments. For example; minimum time in service is sixteen years and minimum rank to apply is gunnery sergeant (E-7) versus eight years and sergeant (E-5). They are not appointed warrant officers, but rather commissioned directly to the grade of chief warrant officer-2 and are the only officers who are officially designated the title, "Marine gunner" and authorized to wear the "Bursting Bomb" insignia. This insignia has twelve points, which originates from the twelve military occupational specialty (MOS) fields present within the Marine infantry community.

The title "gunner" is almost always used in lieu of rank (i.e., "Gunner Deykerhoff" as opposed to "Chief Warrant Officer Deykerhoff"), and the rank insignia worn on the left collar is replaced with a "Bursting Bomb." A larger "Bursting Bomb" insignia is worn ¾" above the rank insignia on both shoulder epaulets when a coat is worn. Occasionally other warrant officers are referred to as "gunner", but this is incorrect.

The gunners' technical skills complemented with infantry field experience fundamentally posits them as advisers to the force commanders within the Fleet Marine Force's task forces (i.e. Marine Expeditionary Force (MEF) and its subordinate units). Marine gunners may be responsible for developing and monitoring weapons training protocols, tactical employment of weapons, preventive maintenance of the unit's infantry weapons, management of the unit's ammunition allocation and the unit training plan, infantry training, and fire support planning. Additional assignments may be based on future needs of the Marine Corps; such as new weapons systems acquisition, new weapons systems research and development.

During combat operations, Marine gunners assists their force commanders in battle tracking; They are sent forward to oversee the battle, reporting directly to task force commanders in a "directed telescope" fashion.

== Billet description and core competencies ==
The Marine Corps Infantry Training and Readiness Manual (NAVMC 3500.44E, 12 Nov 2024) describes the gunner as follows:

The Marine Gunner is a Chief Warrant Officer specifically trained in the employment and training of infantry battalion organic weapons, gear and assigned personnel, and in the Combat Marksmanship continuum. Marine Gunners are special staff officers employed as the principal advisor to commanders at all levels. They assist in the development of training and employment plans designed to ensure Mission Essential Task compliance. They help design and vet the weaponeering and training policies of the commander and help to disseminate information to the unit's personnel regarding such policies. They generate and quantify reports on the unit's technical and tactical weaponeering proficiency and brief the unit commander as to where each subordinate unit sits in regards to commander's intent.

They mentor the officers and Marines of the unit in all applicable mechanical, doctrinal and conceptual weaponeering and training matters as required in order to improve the general effectiveness and proficiency of the command. They have oversight of the unit's ammunition allocation and annual weapons requalification and certification programs. They accommodate all weapons organic to the MAGTF IAW the current version of MCO 3570.1_.

Additional duties will include: Battalion Landing Team (BLT) in support of a MEU, Team New Equipment Training (NET), new weapons systems and gear research and development, foreign weapons training, participation in applicable Course Curriculum Review Boards (CCRB), new curriculum development for marksmanship and infantry related tasks, vetting of draft Infantry, LAR, and Recon Training and Readiness Manuals and Fire Support Planning. They are expected to function as a member of the Infantry advocacy/proponency venue established by the Deputy Commandant of Plans Policies and Operations.

The Gunner's strength is the ability to vet, conduct and quantify combined-arms training and to introduce and sustain basic marksmanship tenets and principles across the Marine Corps. Gunners are advisors on the MOS training requirements and development of all 0302, 0303, 0311, 0313, 0321, 0326, 0331, 0341, 0351, 0352, 0369, 0913, 0931, and 0933 MOSs.

During combat, a Marine Gunner may be tasked to inspect fire plans to ensure organic fires are integrated and mutually supporting at the battalion and regimental levels, act as the commanders "directed telescope" at critical events, command task organized or provisional combat units and/or design, construct and execute expeditionary training venues for Marine, Joint, NATO and Host Nation personnel.

Initial billet assignments will be an Infantry Battalion or a Base/Station Range Complex.

Subsequent billets assignments may include: Reserve Battalion, LAR Battalion, Recon Battalion, Combat Engineer Battalion (CEB), Active/Reserve Regiment, Tactical Training and Exercise Control Group (TTECG), School of Infantry East/West, Infantry Training Battalion (ITB), Marine Combat Training Battalion (MCT), Advanced Infantry Training Battalion (AITB), The Basic School (TBS), Infantry Officer Course (IOC), Marine Corps Security Forces Regiment, Base/Station Rifle Range Complex, Range Control Operations, Weapons Training Battalion Quantico, and Weapons Field Training Battalions (Parris Island & Edson Range). Follow-on billets assignments may include: Active/Reserve Infantry Division, MAGTF-TC, Marksmanship Program Management Section (MPMS), Training and Education Command (TECOM), and Plans, Policies & Operations Headquarters Marine Corps.

== History ==
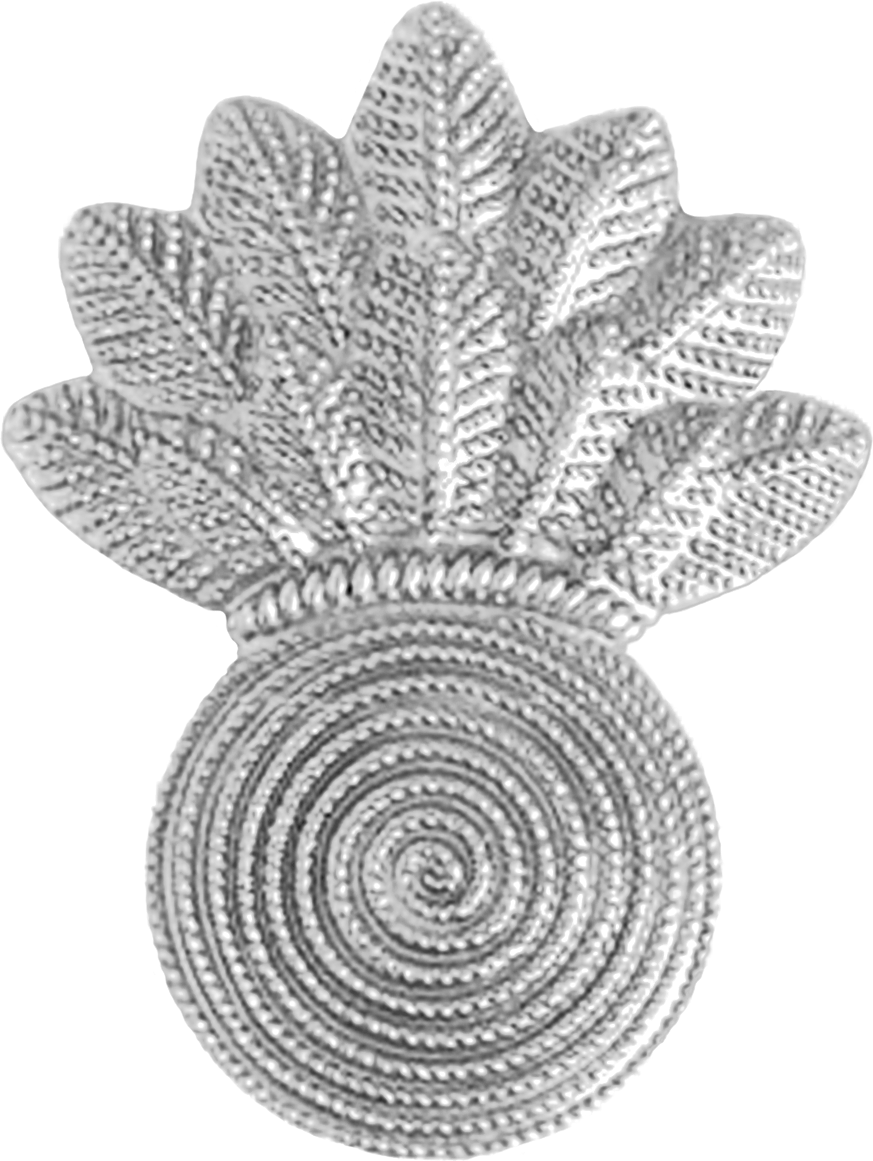
Historic version of the U.S. Marine Corps's Infantry Weapons Officer (Gunner) Insignia

Gunners were the first warrant officers in the Marine Corps when John Francis Burnes and Henry Lewis Hulbert became the first Marines to pin on the bursting bombs on 24 March 1917. Since that time the gunner designation has undergone many changes, including periods where no new gunners were made from 1943 to 1956, 1959 to 1964, and 1974 to 1988. These usually were the result of gunners being promoted to temporary commissioned officer status or changes in the laws governing the rank structure of the military.

Throughout this time, some of the few Marines who have become gunners include:

- Henry L. Hulbert; who was awarded a Medal of Honor for his service during the Samoan Civil War. A trophy bearing his name and image is presented to a Marine gunner for Outstanding Leadership every year by the commandant of the Marine Corps.
- Henry Pierson Crowe, who received the Navy Cross after the Battle of Tarawa.
- William A. Lee, who became the first Marine to receive three Navy Crosses after spending World War II as a Japanese POW in China.
- Lee's father-in-law Maj. Calvin A. Lloyd, for whom the rifle ranges in Quantico are named; though Lloyd retired a major, he always answered the telephone as "Gunner Lloyd".

There are other less well known, but important gunners such as;

- Ira Davidson, the "Daniel Boone of Iwo Jima", who received a Navy Cross for taking out multiple Japanese pill boxes with uncanny accuracy while under withering fire.
- Gilbert Bolton, who was himself decorated for valor with a Silver Star in Vietnam for defending his platoon's position against a vastly larger NVA force by calling in six artillery missions on his own position and provided a link for the new breed of gunners to the past.
- Neil Warren Goddard - served in the USMC for 32 years. Gunner Goddard had the rare distinction of being an Infantry Weapons Expert (a Marine Gunner), as well as a Gunnery Sergeant (E-7), a Chief Warrant Officer 4, and retired as a Captain (O-3). Gunner Goddard spent time at Quantico developing rifles for the USMC during the Vietnam era. He served in the Vietnam War as well during two of his three overseas tours - the other tour being in Okinawa, Japan. He is most famously known for his work in designing / creating the M40A1 sniper rifle with Captain Jack Cuddy.
