= Battle of El Sauce =

1932 battle in Nicaragua

- Part of United States occupation of Nicaragua, Banana Wars
- Battle of El Sauce (Nicaragua)
Date	26 December 1932
Location	near El Sauce, Nicaragua
Result	American-Nicaraguan victory

Belligerents
Nicaragua; United States	Sandinistas

Commanders and leaders
(United States) Cap. Lewis Puller (United States) GySgt William A. Lee	Juan Pablo Umanzor

Strength
8 marines 64 national guard	100–250 guerrillas

Casualties and losses
3 killed 3 wounded	31+ killed 63 horses captured

The Battle of El Sauce, or the Battle of Punta de Rieles or Punta Rieles, took place on the 26 December 1932 during the American occupation of Nicaragua of 1926–1933. It was the last major battle of the Sandino Rebellion of 1927–1933. The incident has its origins in Nicaraguan President José María Moncada's plan to commemorate the completion of the León–El Sauce railway on 28 December 1932.

Rumors spread that Sandinista rebels planned on crashing the ceremony, so an expedition of eight Marines and 64 Nicaraguan National Guardsmen led by Captain Lewis B. "Chesty" Puller were sent by train towards El Sauce on the 26 December 1932 to secure the area. Meanwhile, a Sandinista force led by Juan Pablo Umanzor was looting a construction company commissary. As the Marines'/National Guard's train passed some ancient ruins, it was fired upon by rebels from both sides of the tracks.

Soldiers led by Puller exited the train on the right side, while those following First Lieutenant William A. Lee got out on the left side of the tracks. Lee's men soon took cover in a ditch while Puller's forces "tried to turn Umanzor's left flank." During the firefight, Corporal Bennie M. Bunn grabbed a Browning automatic rifle and began driving the Sandinistas back. After one hour and ten minutes, the battle concluded with victory for the Marines and National Guard. Thirty-one Sandinista corpses were found after the battle (and 63 live horses were captured), compared to losses of three killed and three wounded for the Guard.

Moncada got to participate in the ceremony two days later, as planned. He was so pleased with American performance during the battle that he promoted Puller to major and Lee to captain.
