= Battle of Agua Carta =

1932 Nicaraguan Civil War battle

- Part of the Nicaraguan Civil War, Occupation of Nicaragua, Banana Wars
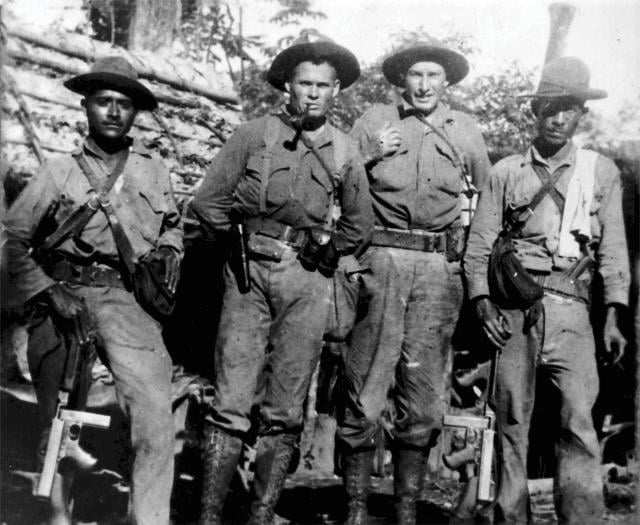
- Chesty Puller (center left) and Ironman Lee (center right) in Nicaragua, 1931.
Date	26 September 1932
Location	Agua Carta, Nicaragua
Result	American-Nicaraguan victory

Belligerents
Nicaragua	Sandinistas

Commanders and leaders
(United States) 1st Lt. Lewis Puller (United States) GySgt William A. Lee	Augusto César Sandino

Strength
2 marines 40 national guard	150 guerrillas

Casualties and losses
2 killed 4 wounded	At least 24 killed 10 dead rebel bodies counted 10 wounded

The Battle of Agua Carta, or the Battle of Lindo Lugar, was an engagement between the National Guard of Nicaragua and the rebels of Augusto César Sandino in 1932. It was fought near Mount Kilambe at the Agua Carta, a river in Sandino territory, as part of the American occupation of Nicaragua and a long lasting civil war.

== Battle ==
Following America's return to Nicaragua in 1926, the United States Marines took command of the Nicaraguan National Guard to fight Sandino's rebels and an occupation began which lasted for several years. In early September, First Lieutenant Chesty Puller discovered a trail which seemed to be the route used by the rebels in their southward thrusts. Chesty Puller returned to Jinotega and with Gunnery Sergeant William "Ironman" Lee organized a strong force of forty guards for a raid like patrol against the rebels. Because both Puller and Lee were technically part of the National Guard, Puller assumed the rank of captain and Lee a first lieutenant. The Nicaraguan national guard force under the command of Puller and Lee left on September 20. After traveling a distance, the patrol moved northwest from the bank of the Auyabal river. On September 26, 1932, the patrol was ambushed by a volley of rifle fire. Ambushes at river crossings were very common during the occupation so Captain Puller and his guards had no trouble in fending off the attack. A quick charge sent the attackers scurrying, for this was merely an attempt to harass the patrol. Lieutenant William A. Lee using a Lewis machine gun kept the enemy pinned down while the Nicaraguan guard worked their way up the slope opposite the rebel ambush party. When they gained the crest, they were able to fire directly into the rebel emplacements.

Puller's men had penetrated the center of a rebel encampment, seemingly killing sixteen of the enemy in the process. However, only ten rebels were counted dead and at least ten others escaped wounded. Of the guards, two men were killed and four wounded. To obtain medical care for his wounded, Puller immediately withdrew back toward Jinotega. On the return to Jinotega, Puller's patrol was ambushed twice but suffered no further casualties and instead the Nicaraguan guard under Puller killed eight more rebels. Puller's patrol force arrived back at Jinotega on September 30 after their raid on the rebel encampment. Captain Puller received his second Navy Cross of five and later became a general in the United States Marine Corps. First Lieutenant Lee who received some wounds in this operation survived and also received a Navy Cross on September 30.

== Bibliography ==
- Alexander, H. Joseph; Don Horan (1999). The Battle History of the U.S. Marines: A Fellowship of Valor. Harper Collins Publishing.
