= El Sauce, Nicaragua =

El Sauce
- Municipality
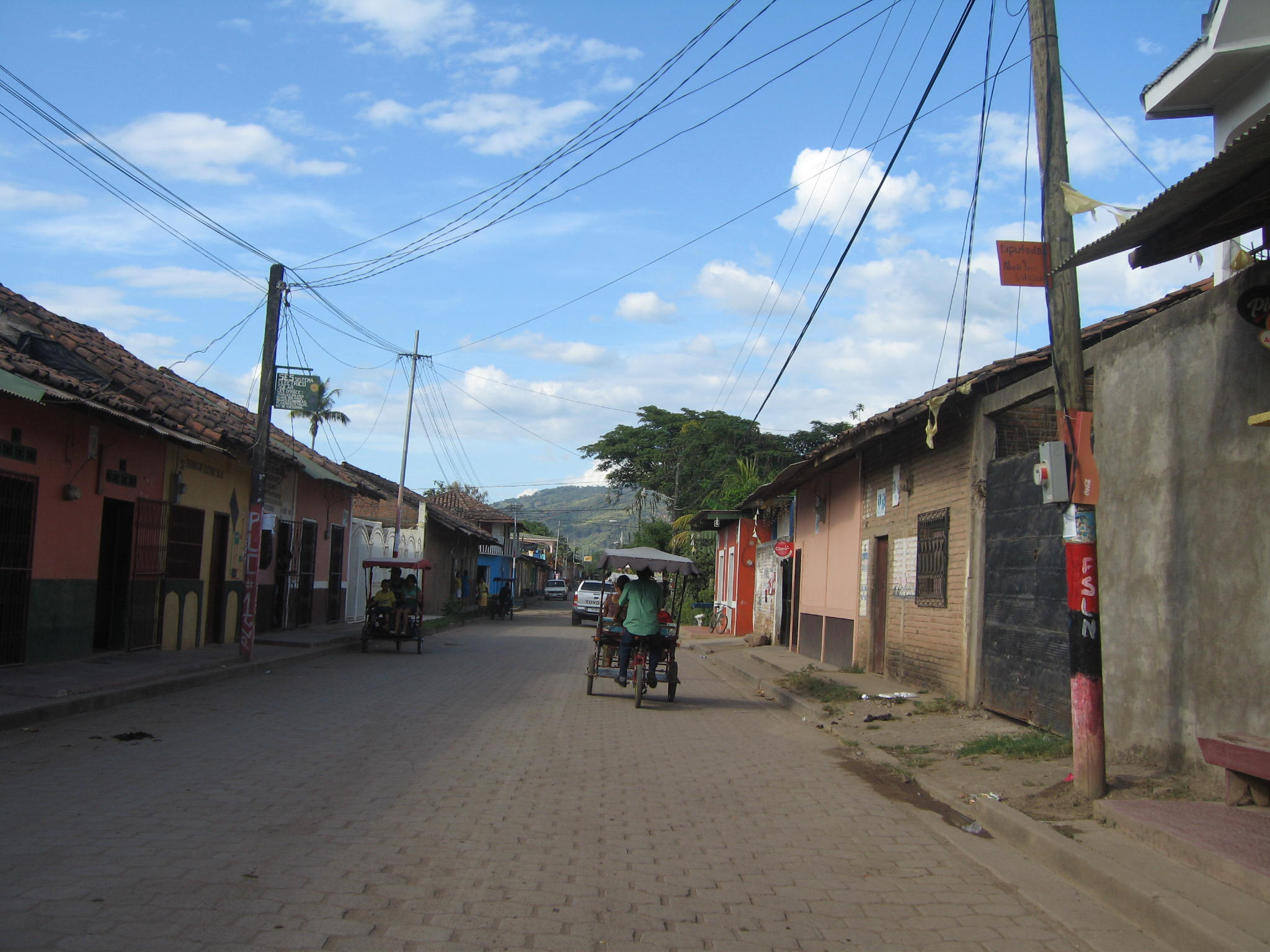
- A street in El Sauce

- Location within Nicaragua
- Coordinates: 12°53′0″N 86°32′0″W
- Country: Nicaragua
- Department: León Department

Area
  - Municipality: 693 km^{2} (268 sq mi)

Population (2022 estimate)
  - Municipality: 31,750
  - Density: 45.8/km^{2} (119/sq mi)
  - Urban: 11,683
- Time zone: UTC−6 (Central (CST))

El Sauce (Spanish pronunciation: [el ˈsawse]) is a town and a municipality in the León Department of Nicaragua. Located in the foothills of the Segovia Mountains, the municipality has a population of 31,750 and covers an area of 693 km^{2}.

El Sauce is bordered to the north by the municipalities of Achuapa and Estelí and bordered to the south by the municipality of Larreynaga.

== History ==
El Sauce was originally called Guayabal. The town gained much attention when a statue called the Black Christ of Esquipulas was sent there from Guatemala was placed for the first time under a willow tree. From then, the area was renamed "El Sauce".

During the decade of 1900, El Sauce was a railway crossing which included items such as coffee and animals being moved to the port city of Corinto. The railway closed 40 years ago because it was sold as scrap, an event that had significant impact on the railway closure. El Sauce is still a small town dedicated to agricultural production, bees, and livestock.

The town was the site of a battle that pitted the American Marines and Nicaraguan National Guardsmen against Sandinista rebels on December 26, 1932, during the Sandino Rebellion. It was the last major action of the war.

== Population ==
In 1971, El Sauce had a population of 12,869 inhabitants. In 1995 the population grew to 24,289 inhabitants, which represents 7.36% of total department. The annual growth rate of the municipality of the last inter-census period (1971–1995) was 2.82%.

El Sauce, León, Nicaragua

== Gallery ==
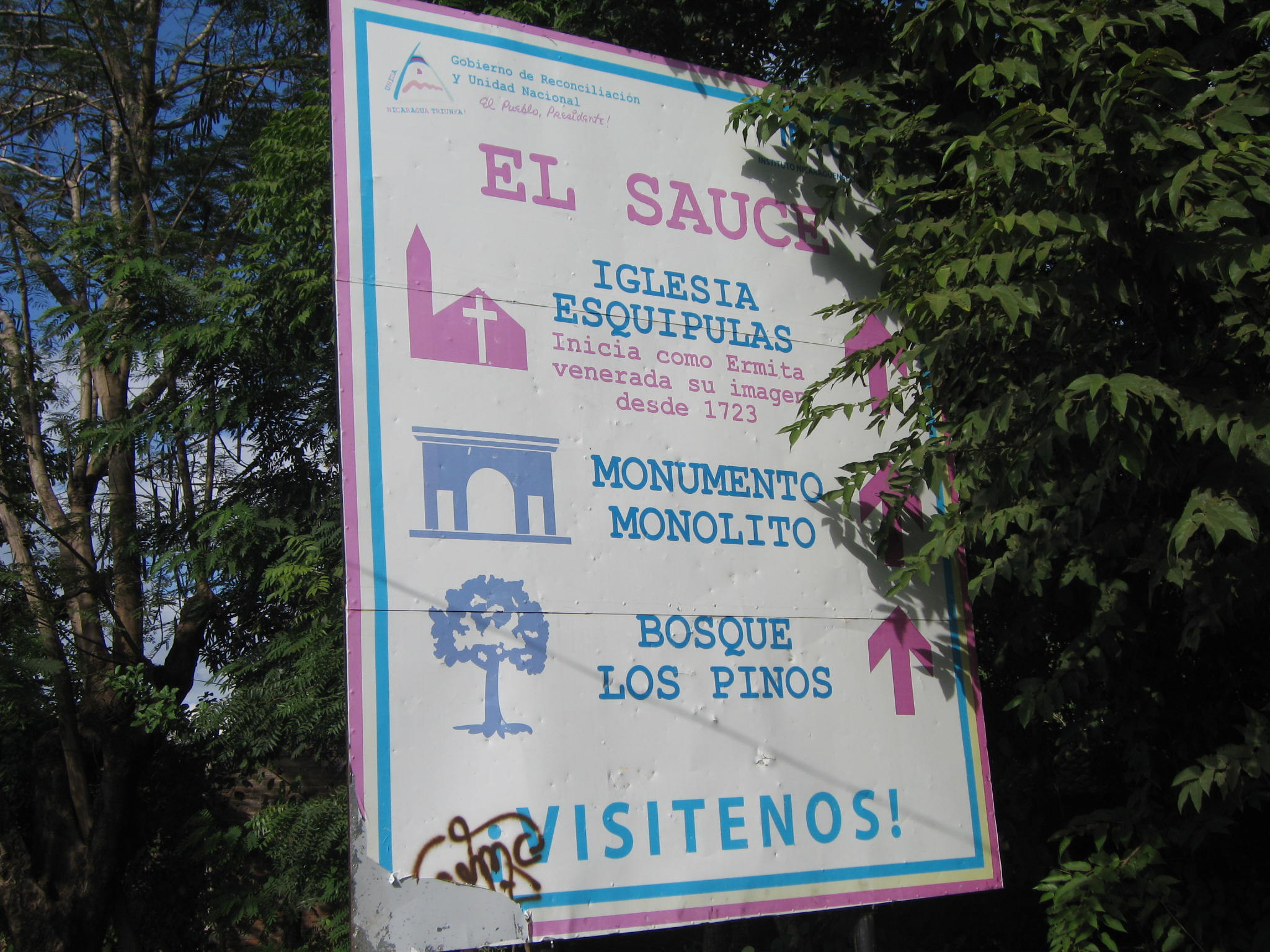
The welcome sign to El Sauce

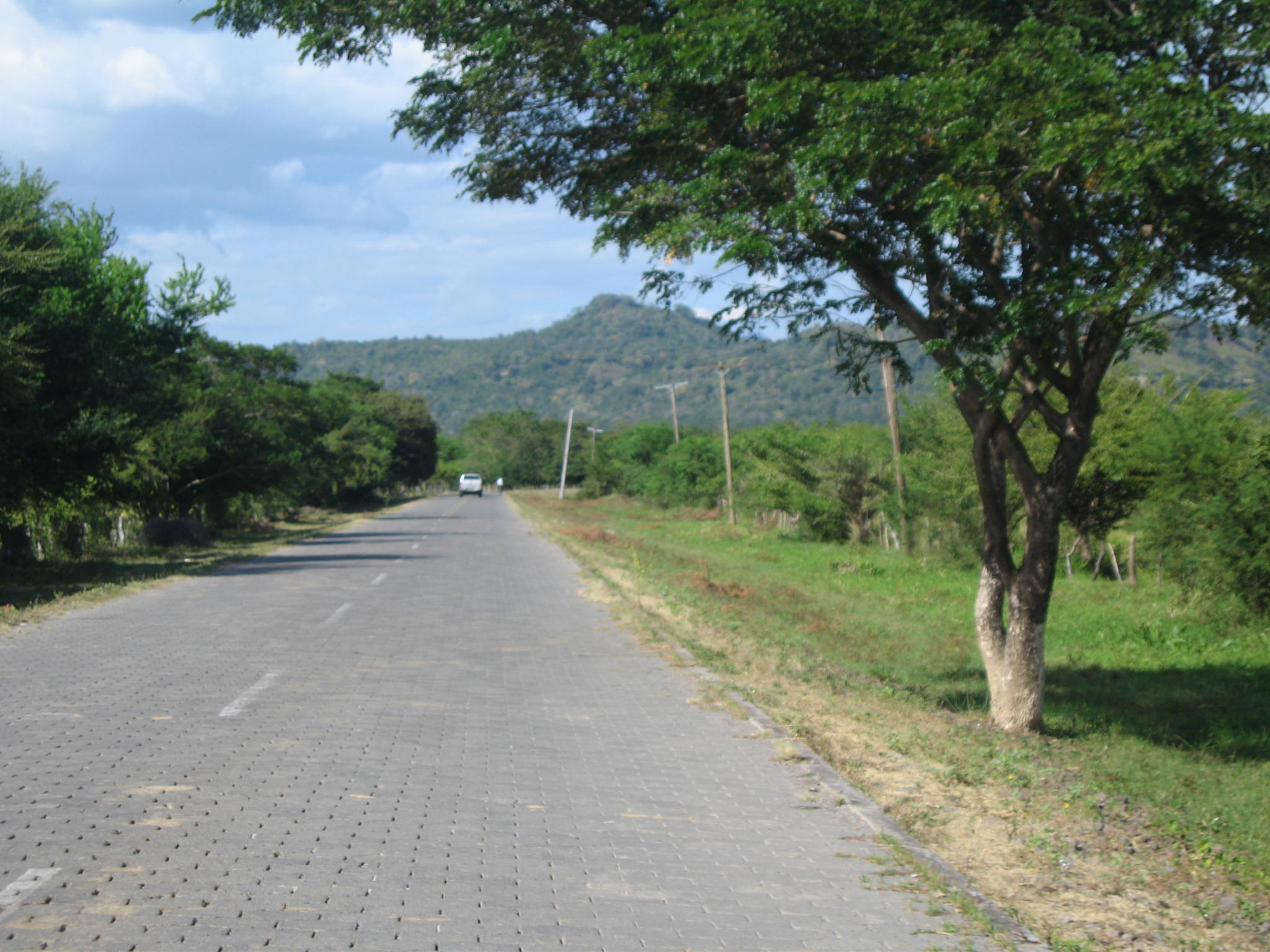
The early cobblestone road going into El Sauce

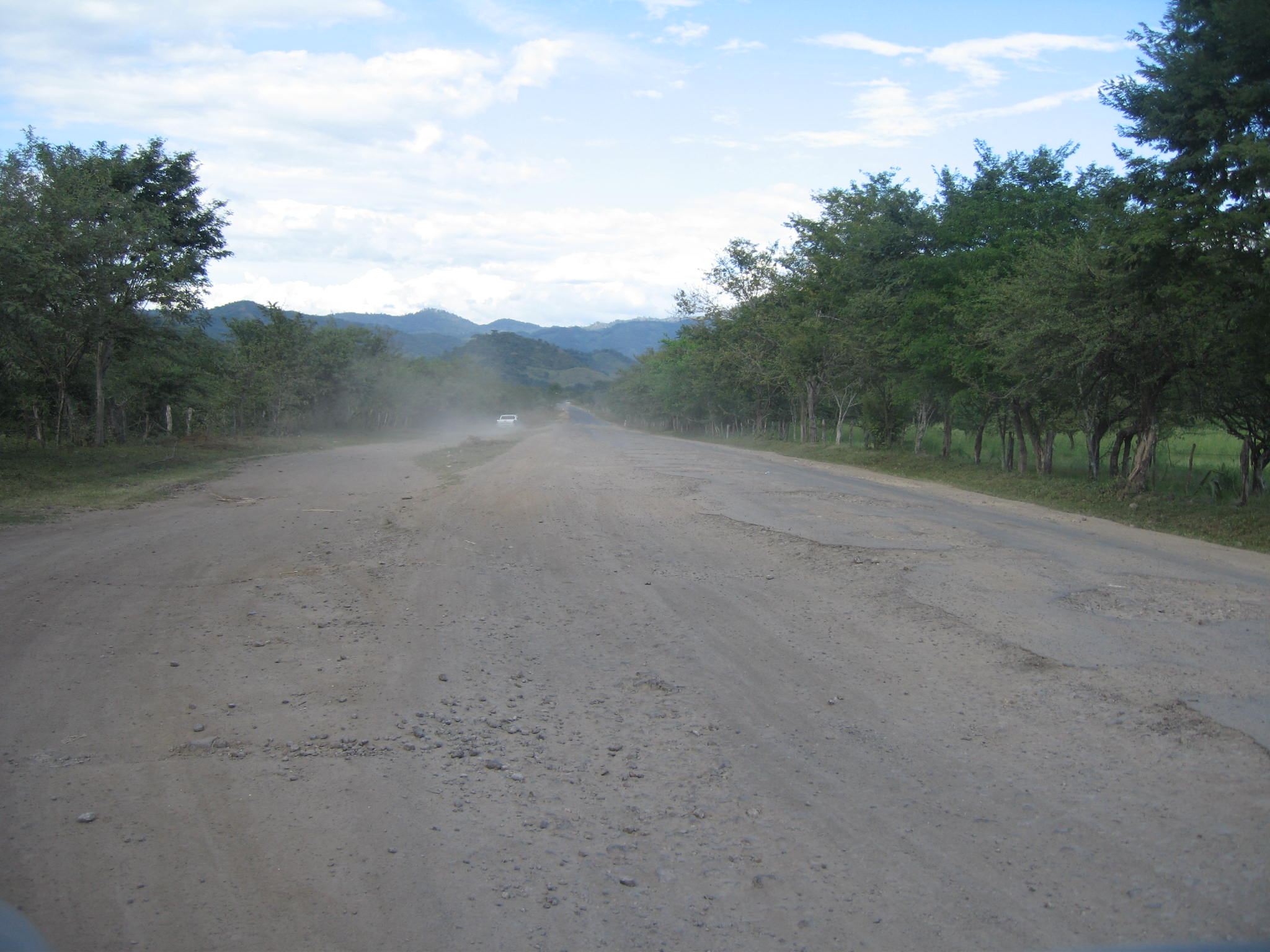
The second half of the road going into El Sauce

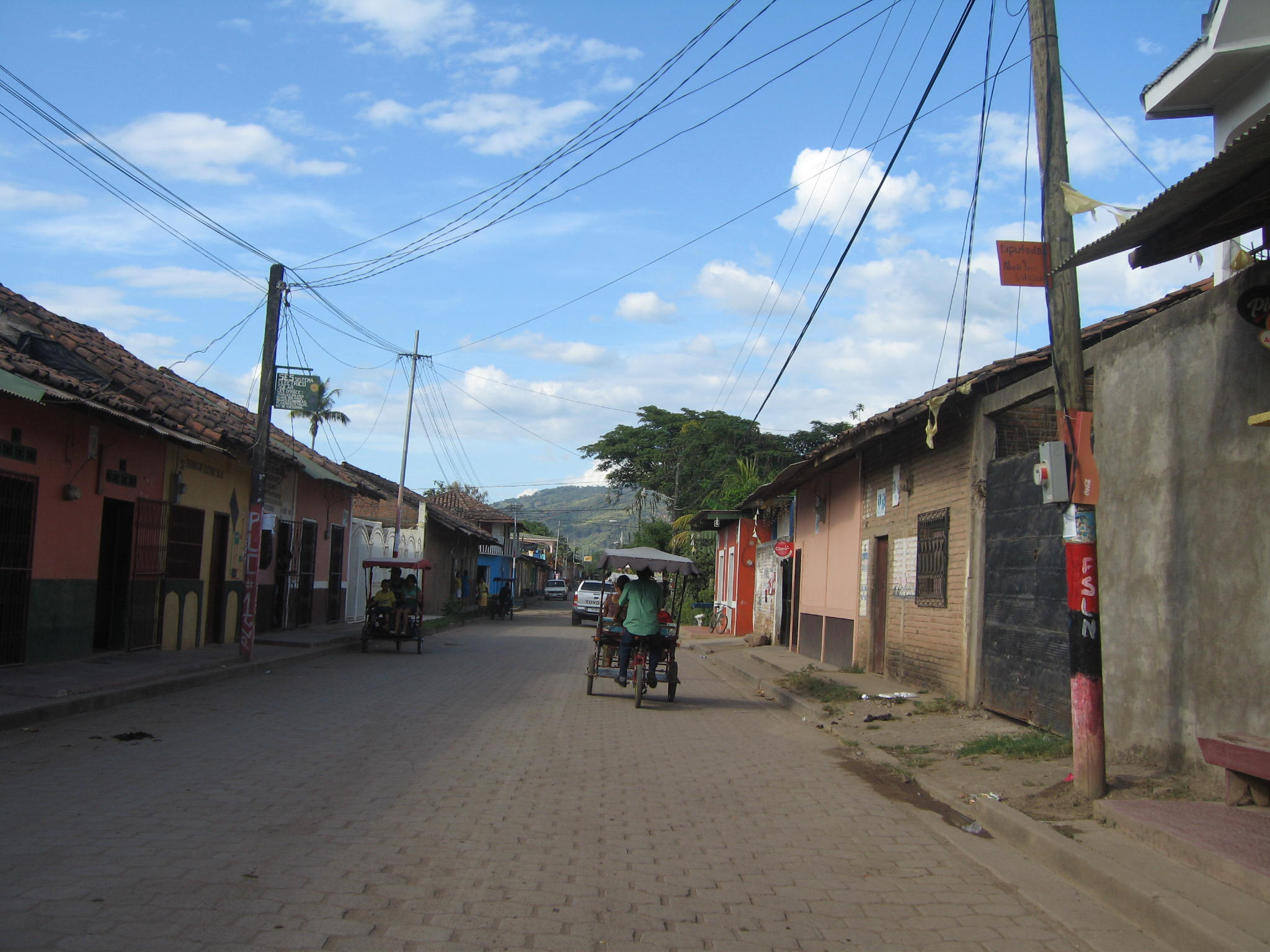
A street in El Sauce
